= Culture of Luxembourg =

Claus Cito's Gëlle Fra topping the Monument of Remembrance (1923)

The culture of Luxembourg refers to the cultural life and traditions of Luxembourg. Most citizens are trilingual, speaking French and German in addition to the Germanic national language of Luxembourgish. Although its contributions to the arts are not largely known outside its borders, Luxembourg has a rich cultural history, especially in music, painting and photography. Its evolving museums, concert halls, theatres and galleries testify to its citizens' growing appreciation of culture.

== Arts ==
=== Painting ===
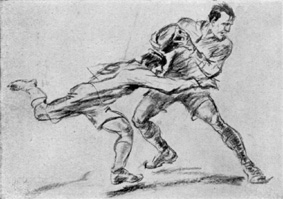
Jean Jacoby: Rugby (1928)

Jean-Baptiste Fresez and Nicolas Liez who both painted the City of Luxembourg and its surroundings were the country's most important 19th-century artists. Jean Jacoby, who was awarded two Olympic Gold medals for his artwork and, above all, Joseph Kutter with his Expressionist landscapes and portraits, were notable during the first half of the 20th century. Kutter's brightly coloured painting of "Luxembourg", commissioned for the 1937 World Exposition in Paris reveals his mature Expressionist style, of which there is more than natural emphasis on how the houses appear to be stacked up one behind the other, how the buildings take on almost cubic contours and how the fortifications tower powerfully above the valley.

Other celebrated painters of the periods were the Impressionist Dominique Lang; Nico Klopp, who painted striking post-impressionist landscapes of the Moselle; and Sosthène Weis, whose innumerable watercolours of Luxembourg City and its surroundings are reminiscent of the style of J. M. W. Turner. Major contributors to the art scene after World War II were Emile Kirscht, Michel Stoffel, Foni Tissen, and Gust Graas. Closely associated with the post-war artists was the sculptor Lucien Wercollier whose impressive abstract works in bronze and marble can be found not just in public places in Luxembourg but in the surrounding countries too.

The sculptor Claus Cito (1882–1965) is remembered above all for the Gëlle Fra (Golden Woman) sculpture crowning the Monument of Remembrance obelisk (1923), raised in memory of the Luxembourg soldiers who died for their country in the First World War.

One of the country's most successful contemporary artists is Su-Mei Tse who, in 2003, won the Golden Lion, a prize awarded to the best national participant at the Venice International Exhibition of Contemporary Art.

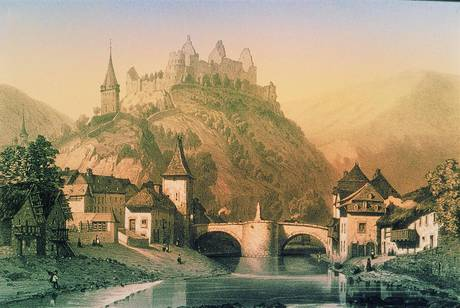
Jean-Baptiste Fresez: Vianden near the Bridge (c. 1857)

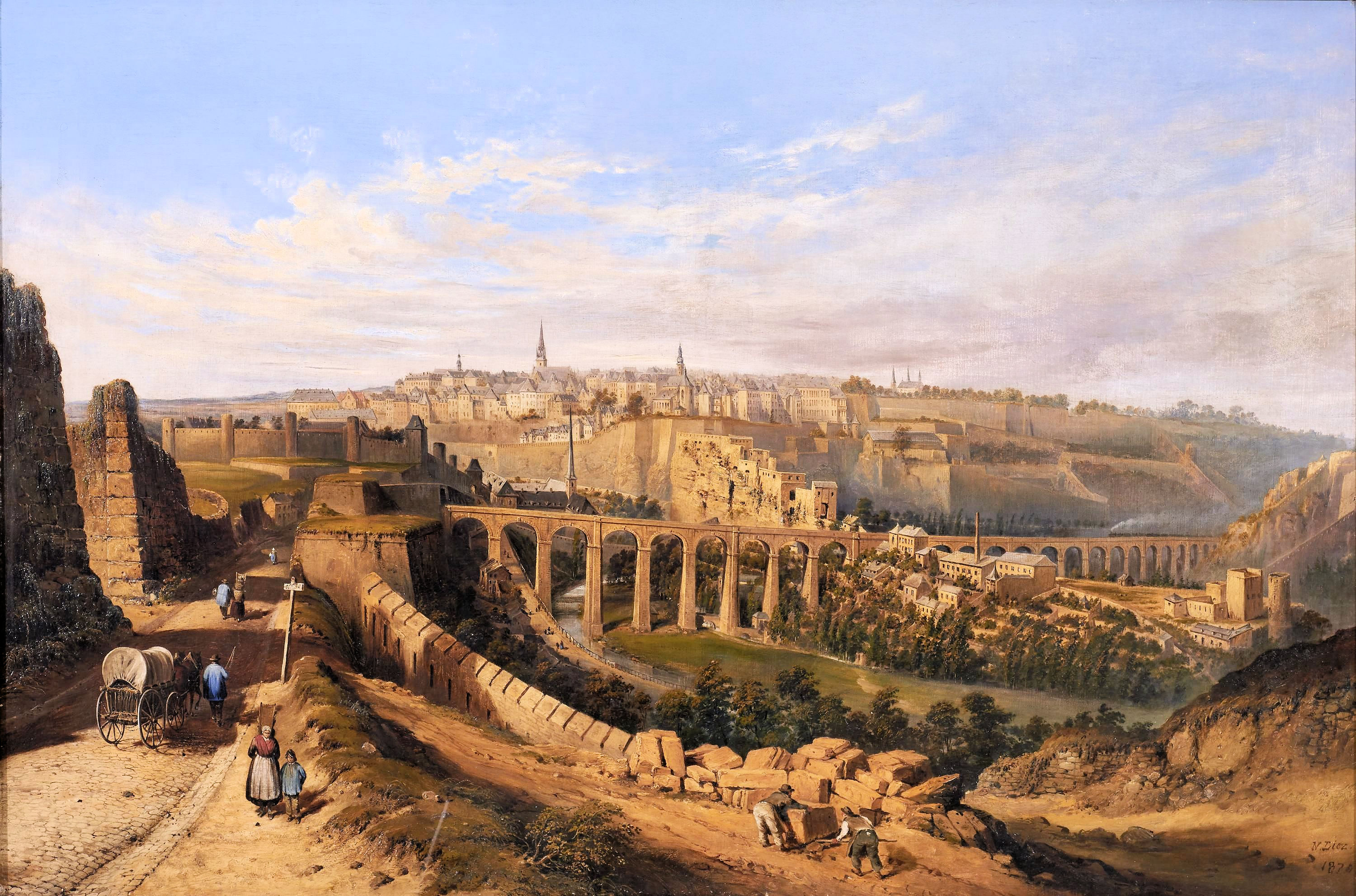
Nicolas Liez: View of Luxembourg from the Fetschenhof (1870)

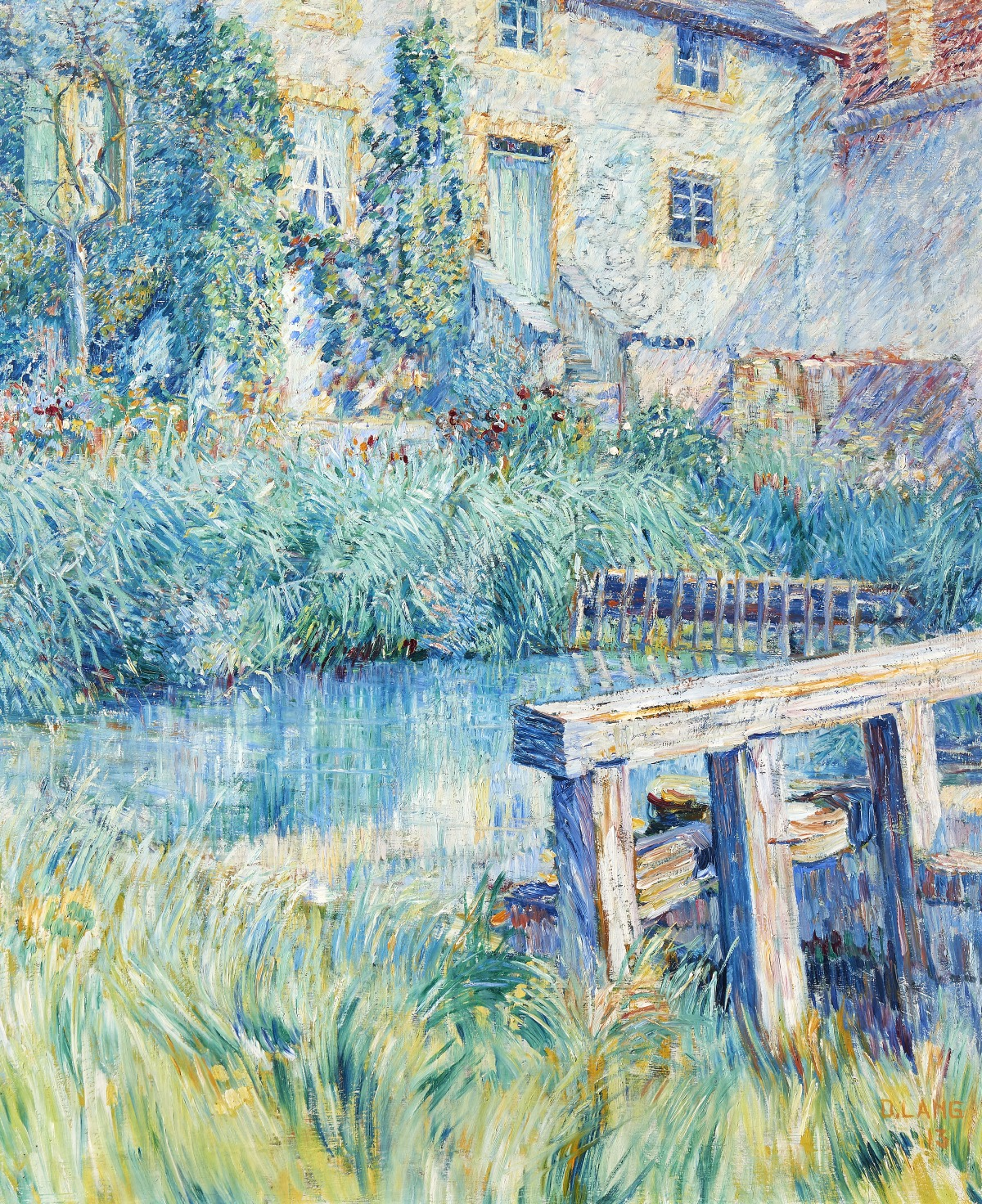
Dominique Lang: Le Barrage (1913)

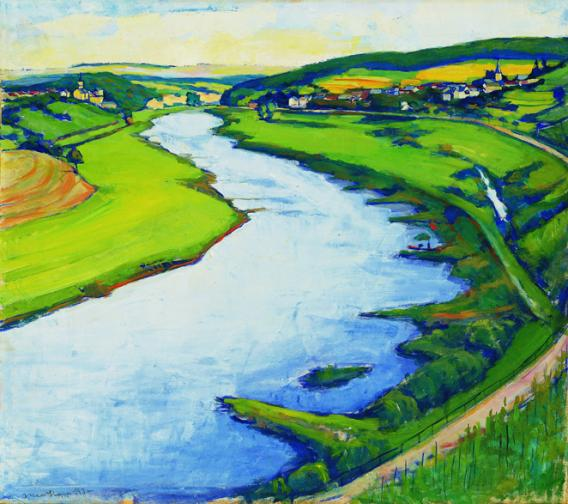
Nico Klopp: Loop in the Moselle at Greiveldange with Stadtbredimus (1930)

=== Photography ===
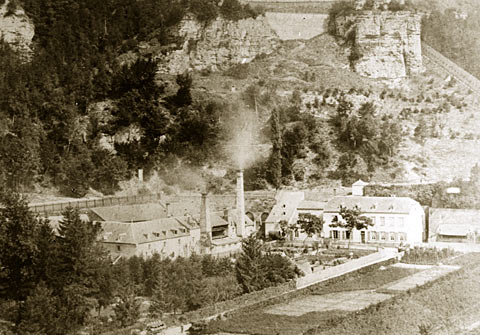
Pierre Brandenbourg: Early photograph of Brasserie Clausen (1865)

Considering the country's small size, the photography in Luxembourg has made an important contribution to local culture. Although he grew up and worked all his life in the United States, the influential photographer and painter Edward Steichen was of Luxembourg descent, and after the Second World War as manager of the photography department at the Museum of Modern Art in New York City, he arranged two important donations for Luxembourg. First in 1964, he provided a permanent home in Clervaux, Luxembourg for his famous exhibition "The Family of Man"; and then in 1967, the USA sent another treasure to Luxembourg, the exhibition "The Bitter Years". Similarly, Gabriel Lippmann who was also born in Luxembourg but moved to France when only three, was awarded the Nobel Prize for his pioneering work in colour photography. Charles Bernhoeft (1859-1933) was a successful portrait and landscape photographer, publishing a number of luxurious albums, illustrated maps and several series of postcards.

Contemporary photographers include the photojournalists Patrick Galbats, Yvon Lambert and Thierry Frisch.

=== Literature and poetry ===
Little is known of Luxembourg literature beyond the country's borders, partly because three languages are used, partly because many works assume a local readership. Furthermore, it was not until the 19th century that the literature of Luxembourg began to develop.

In 1829, Antoine Meyer published the very first book in Lëtzebuerger Däitsch, the local Germanic dialect later called Luxembourgish, a collection of poems titled "E' Schrek op de' Lezeburger Parnassus" (A Step up Luxembourg's Parnassus).

Edmond de la Fontaine (1823–1891), better known by his pen-name Dicks, is considered the national poet of Luxembourg. Along with Michel Lentz and Michel Rodange, he is an outstanding figure in the history of Luxembourg literature, writing poetry in Luxembourgish. Another influential writer was Batty Weber (1860–1940) who worked both as a journalist and as an author of short stories, novels, plays and poems, contributing much to the development of Luxembourg culture. Anise Koltz (born in 1928), first writing mainly in German and Luxembourgish but later in French, is the country's most important contemporary author. Another successful contemporary novelist and poet is Jean Portante (born in 1950).

Luxembourgish literature was long confined to poetry and the theatre, but in the 1980s, as a result of the movement to make Luxembourgish an official language, Guy Rewenig (born in 1947) and Roger Manderscheid (1933–2010) both wrote novels in Luxembourgish. Rewenig's Hannert dem Atlantik appeared in 1985 and Manderscheid's childhood trilogy Schacko klak, De papagei um kâschtebam and Feier a flam in 1988.

=== Architecture ===
The city of Luxembourg is on the UNESCO World Heritage List.

The architecture of Luxembourg extends back to the Treveri, a Celtic tribe that prospered in the 1st century BC. A few ruins remain from the Roman occupation but the most significant contributions over the centuries have been the country's castles and churches. Notable examples are the Vianden Castle and the Echternach Basilica. Today there is a veritable architectural boom as Luxembourg's economic prosperity provides a basis for developments in the financial, EU and cultural sectors with a number of world-class buildings. These include the Philharmonie Concert Hall, the Museum of Modern Art and the new European Investment Bank building.

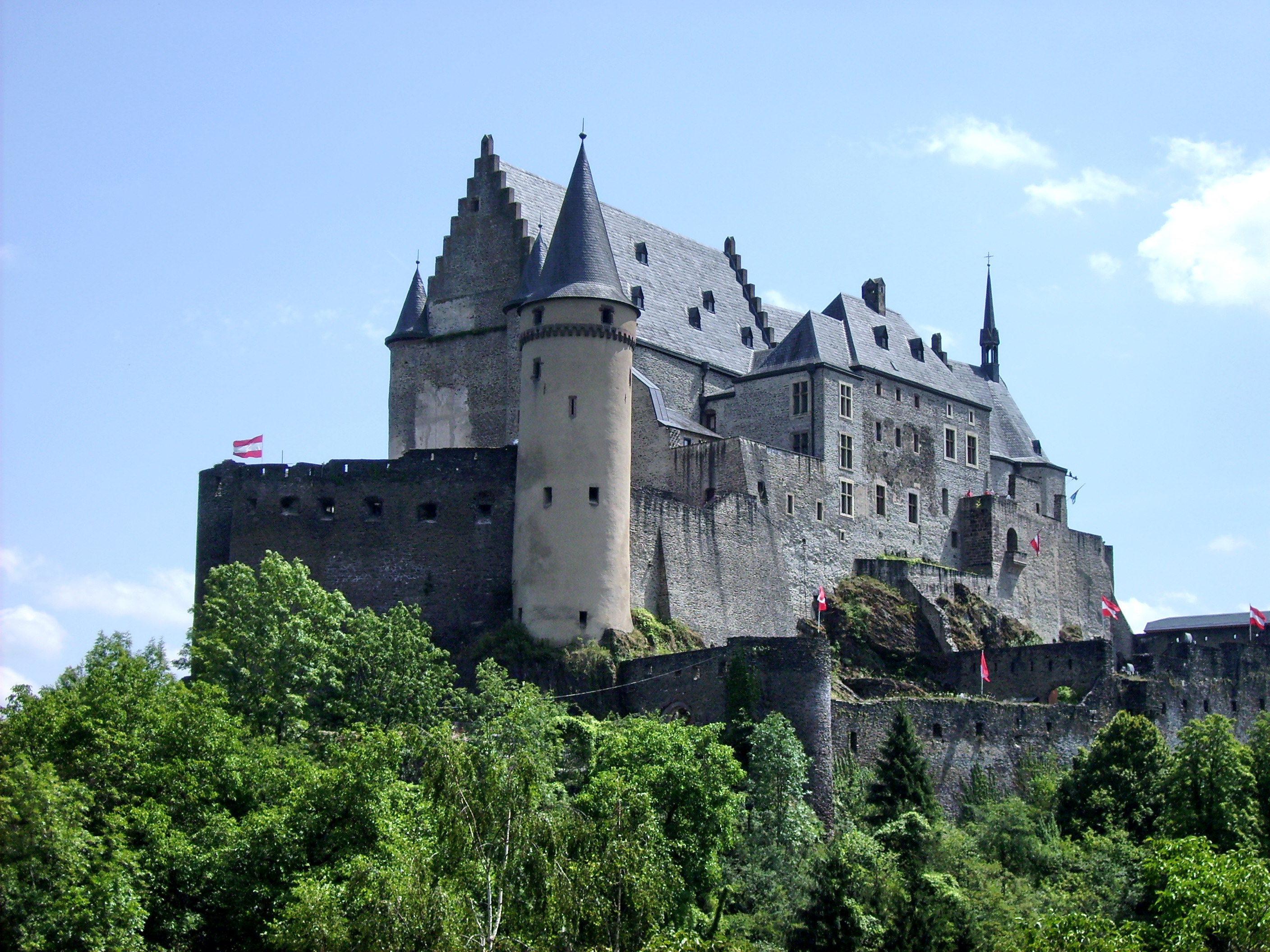
Vianden Castle

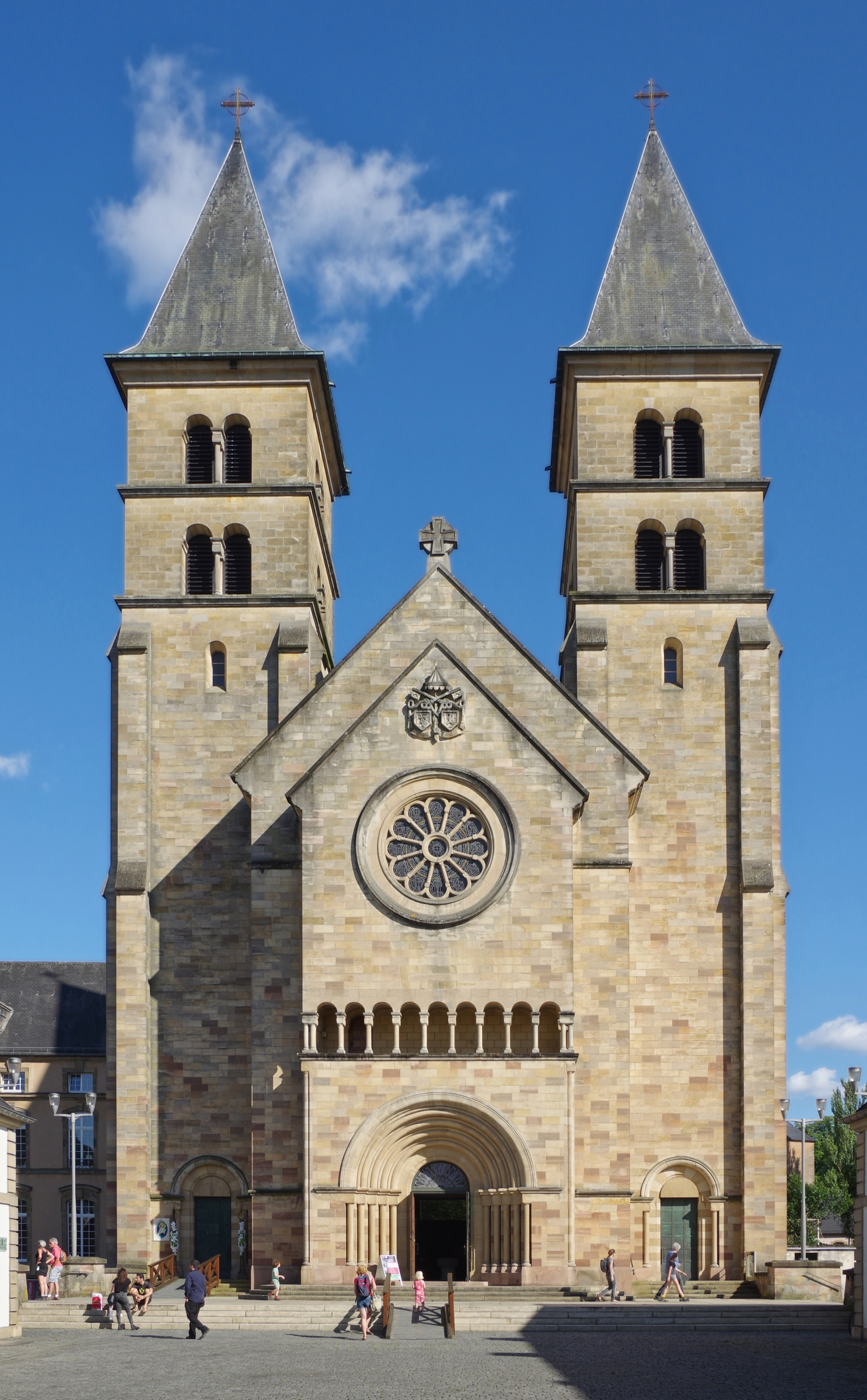
Echternach Basilica

Kirchberg Plateau's modern architecture

=== Music ===
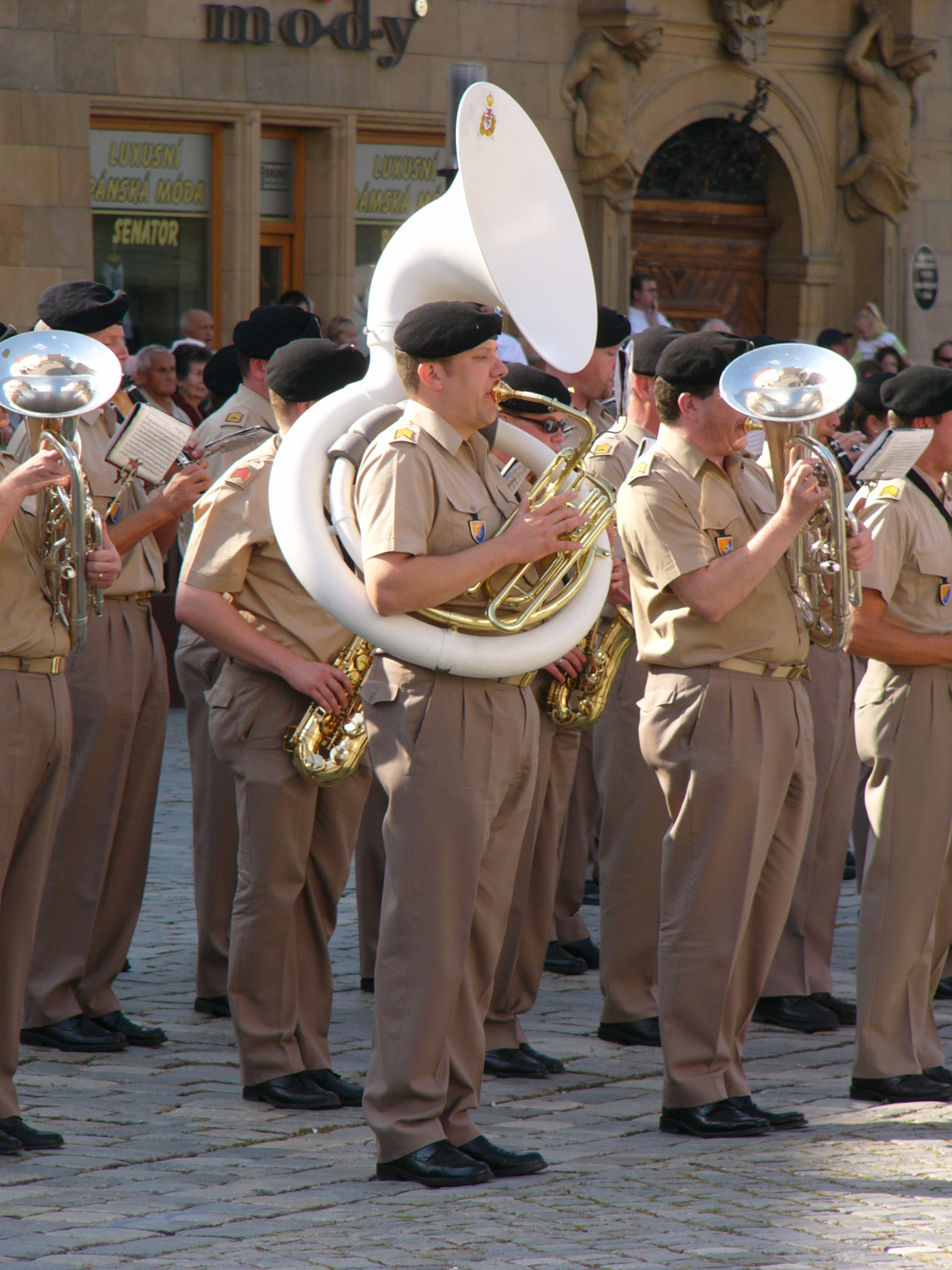
Luxembourg Military Band

The wide general interest in music and musical activities in Luxembourg can be seen from the membership of the Union Grand-Duc Adolphe, the national music federation for choral societies, brass bands, music schools, theatrical societies, folklore associations and instrumental groups. Some 340 societies with over 17,000 individual members are currently represented by the organization.

The two main venues for classical music in Luxembourg are the Philharmonie concert hall, home to the Philharmonie de Luxembourg orchestra, and the Grand Théâtre de Luxembourg with frequent performances of opera and ballet. Luxembourg's internationally recognized soloists include violinist Sandrine Cantoreggi, cellist Françoise Groben, pianists Francesco Tristano Schlimé and Jean Muller, and singer Mariette Kemmer. Among its contemporary composers are Camille Kerger, Claude Lenners, Georges Lentz (although he lives mainly in Australia), Alexander Mullenbach and Marcel Wengler.

Composers such as Alexander Mullenbach provide key insights into the uniqueness of the cultural perspective of Luxembourgers: "One of the most important qualities of being a Luxembourger abroad is the fact that we have an affinity, linguistically and culturally, with both the German and French (and also Anglo-Saxon) culture. This allows us as Luxembourgers to have a different approach and access to these cultures, especially when working in the arts or cultural scene."

Opera is frequently performed in Luxembourg City at the Grand Théâtre and in Esch-sur-Alzette at the Théâtre d'Esch as well as at the annual Wiltz festival.

Brian Molko, singer/guitarist of rock band Placebo lived in Luxembourg for most of his life, where he learned to play various instruments such as guitar, piano and saxophone. Bassist Stefan Olsdal also lived there, the two of them met at school in Luxembourg but lost touch until they met again years later in London. One of the most influential Luxembourg bands of the last decades is Cool Feet, which performs old Luxembourgish songs.

Luxembourg was a founding participant of the Eurovision Song Contest, and participated every year between 1956 and before it was relegated after the 1993, with the exception of 1959. Although Luxembourg was free to participate again in 1995, it chose not to return to the competition before 2024. It has won the competition a total of five times, 1961, 1965, 1972, 1973 and 1983 and hosted the contest in 1962, 1966, 1973, and 1984. Only nine of its 38 entries before 2024, and none of its five winning entries, were performed by Luxembourgish artists. On its 2024 return, this was, however, with a particular emphasis on promoting music and artists from Luxembourg.

For modern popular music concerts, the neighborhood of Belval in Esch-Sur-Alzette hosts the venue of Rockhal, one of the largest venues for international Pop/Rock acts. For outdoor festivals, the city of Echternach has hosted the e-Lake Music Festival of electronic music the second week of every August since 1997.

== Cultural institutions ==
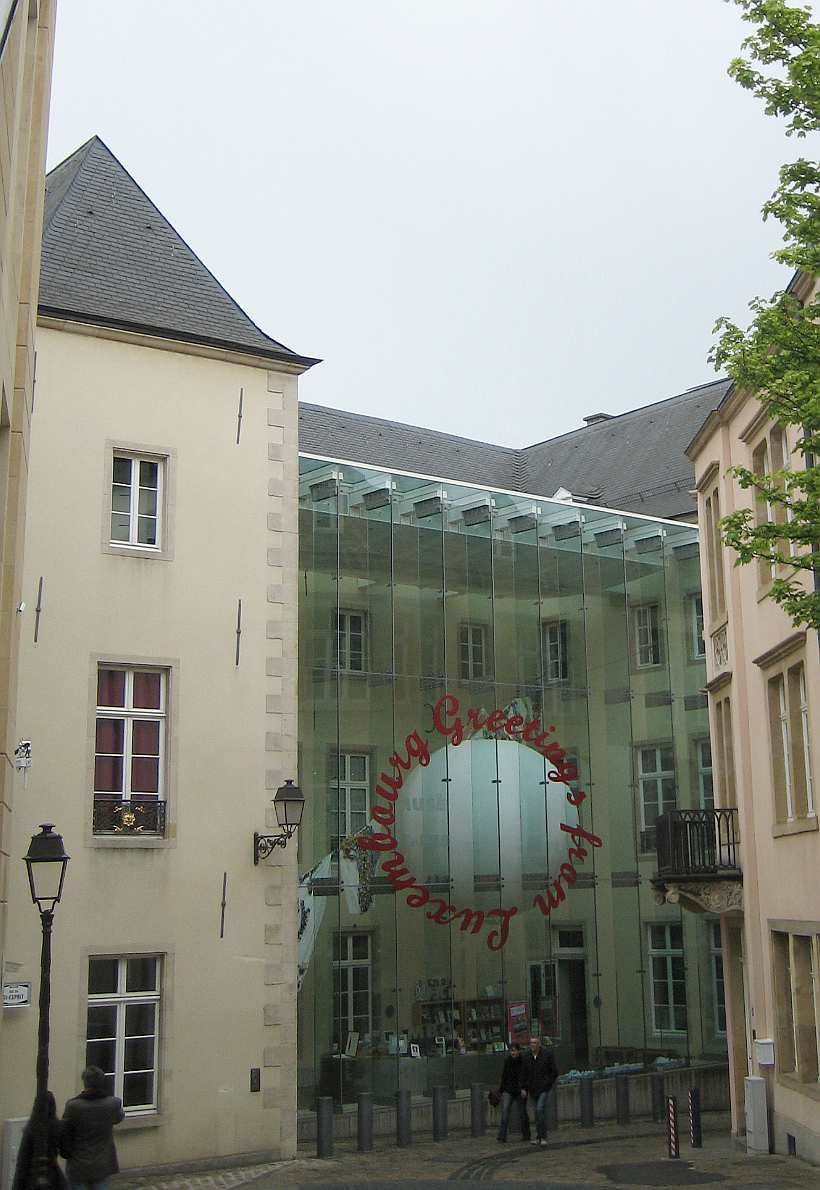
Luxembourg City History Museum

=== Museums ===
The major museums are:

- National Museum of History and Art (MNHA)
- National Museum of Natural History (NMHN)
- Luxembourg City History Museum
- Museum of Modern Art Grand-Duc Jean (MUDAM)
- National Museum of Resistance and Human Rights, Esch-sur-Alzette
- National Mining Museum, Luxembourg
- National Museum of Military History, Diekirch

=== Galleries ===
- Casino Luxembourg, forum for contemporary art in Luxembourg City
- Villa Vauban, art museum

=== Exhibitions ===
- The Family of Man exhibit at Clervaux Castle

== Cuisine ==
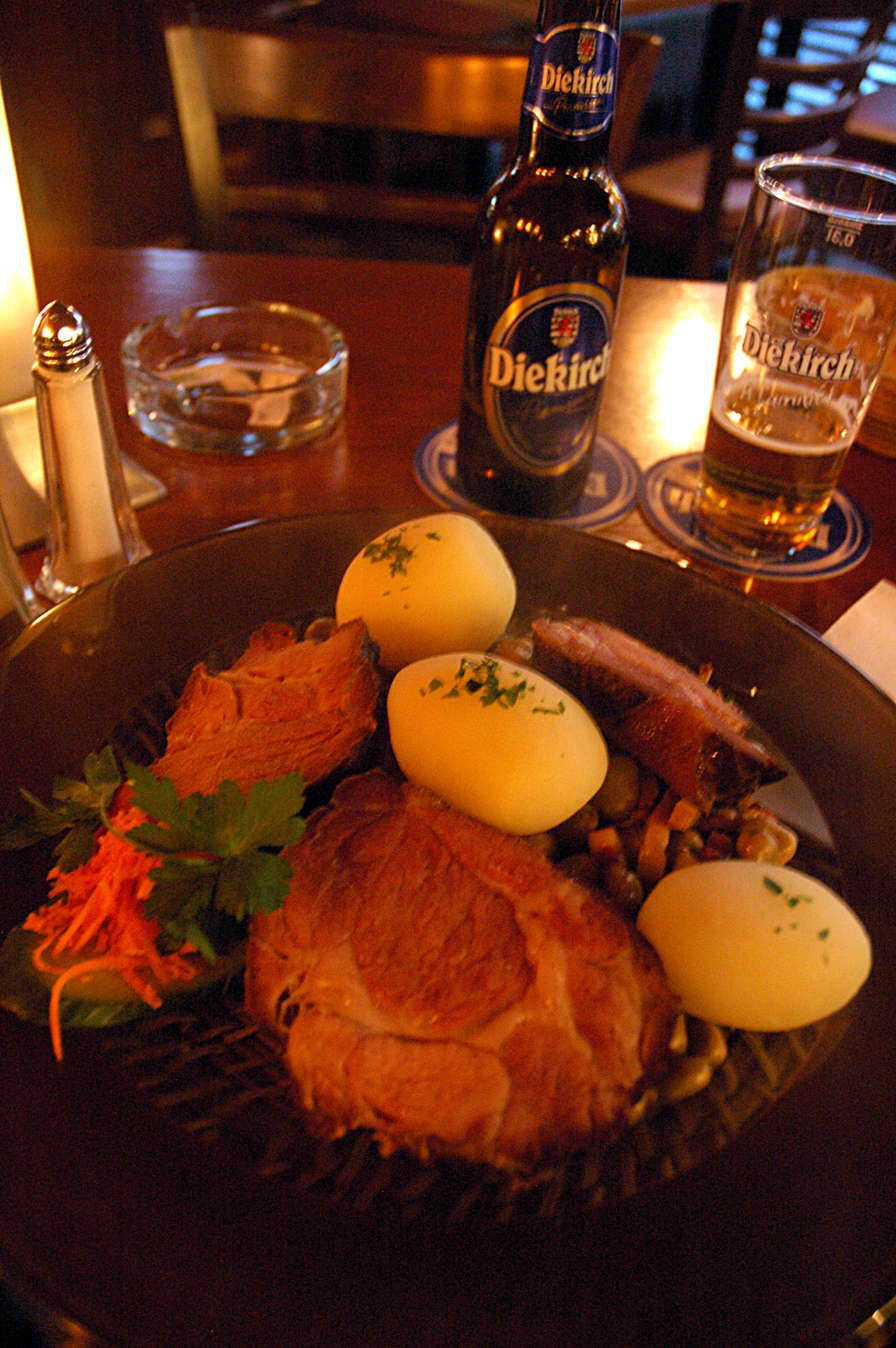
Judd mat Gaardebounen, served with boiled potatoes and Diekirch beer

=== Food ===
Luxembourg's cuisine has been influenced over the years by neighboring France, Germany, and Belgium. More recently, it has had influence from its many Italian and Portuguese immigrants.

Luxembourg has many delicacies including its pastries, cheese, and fresh fish (brown trout, pike, and crayfish). Other delicacies include the Ardennes ham smoked in saltpeter, game during hunting season (such as hare and wild boar), small plum tarts in September (Quetsch), smoked neck of pork with broad beans (Judd mat Gaardebounen), fried small river fish (such as bream, chub, gudgeon, roach, and rudd), liver dumplings (Quenelle) with sauerkraut and boiled potatoes, black pudding (Träipen), sausages with mashed potatoes and horseradish, and green bean soup (Bouneschlupp). French cuisine is prominent on many menus, and to a lesser extent so are German and Belgian cuisines.

=== Alcohol ===
A number of white and sparkling wines are produced in Luxembourg, on the north bank of the Moselle, which has a winemaking history dating back to the Romans. Luxembourg is known for making several different kinds of wine including Riesling, Pinot gris, Pinot noir, Pinot blanc, Auxerrois, Rivaner, Elbling, Gewürztraminer, and Crémant de Luxembourg. Authentic Luxembourg wine can be identified by the National Mark.

Luxembourg has a fair number of breweries, given its tiny size. Imported beer, however, is increasingly gaining control of the beer market in Luxembourg. During the 1970s and 1980s, over 600,000 hectoliters (almost 16 million US gallons) of beer were brewed each year. The peak was reached in 1976 when over 800,000 hectoliters of beer were brewed, and since then the amount has been decreasing. In 2001, production dropped below 400,000 hectoliters for the first time since 1950. Some beers are currently made in Luxembourg, including Battin Edelpils, Battin Extra, Brasserie Battin, Bière Blonde and others at the Restaurant Beierhaascht, Bofferding Lager, Brasserie Bofferding, Héngeschter, Cornelyshaff, Diekirch Premium, InBev-owned Brasserie de Luxembourg Mousel-Diekirch SA, Simon Dinkel and others at the Brasserie Simon. The Brasserie de Redang also brewed beer for five years, but closed in 2005.

=== Specialties ===
These are some specialties of Luxembourg:

- Thüringer - Inexpensive, small sausages that taste like a spicy version of the German bratwurst. They are often sold by street vendors and at roadside stands. New regulations prohibit the use of the word "Thüringer" as it is now regionally protected and reserved to sausages produced in the German free state of Thuringia. They are now commonly referred to as "Grillwurscht" (Lëtzebuerger) or "Grillinger".
- Bouneschlupp - A green bean soup.
- Gromperekichelcher - A carefully spiced potato pancake with chopped onions and parsley, then deep-fried. They are available at roadside stands as well.
- Éisleker Ham - Smoke-cured raw ham, said to look like the Italian Prosciutto crudo, sliced paper-thin and commonly served with fresh bread.
- Kachkéis (cooked cheese) - A soft cheese spread.
- Pâté - A spreadable paste, usually made of meat but vegetarian versions exist.
- Quetschentaart - A plum tart; along with peach, cherry, and pear tarts, it is a typical dessert and can be found in any pastry shop or restaurant.

== Sports ==
=== Football ===
Football is the most popular sport in Luxembourg. Football in Luxembourg is governed by the Luxembourg Football Federation (FLF), which is a member of FIFA and UEFA. The FLF organises the men's, women's, and futsal national teams.

The Luxembourg National Division is the premier domestic sports League in the country. Luxembourg was amongst the first countries in the world to be introduced to football, with the National Division being established in 1913, and the national team playing its first match in 1911.

The game of football is the most popular sport in the whole country of Luxembourg (especially in the south), having developed earliest in the industrial Red Lands and Luxembourg City. Only once has the National Division been won by a team not from south of the country. Historically, Jeunesse Esch has been Luxembourg's most successful domestic club, having won the National Division on 27 occasions out of 93. Since 2000, the league has been dominated by F91 Dudelange, which has won the league on six of the past eight occasions.

The national team, nicknamed D'Roud Léiwen ('The Red Lions'), ranked among the weakest in the world in the 2000s and early 2010s. As of February 2024, the team has never qualified for either a World Cup or a European Championship. Under trainer Luc Holtz, the Red Lions have gained more prominence, attaining their highest ever FIFA ranking at 82nd in 2018, and achieving results that have included a 1-0 victory over Ireland in 2021, and a relatively successful qualifying campaign for the 2024 European Championship. Luxembourg's most famous past players include Louis Pilot and Guy Hellers, both of whom also coached the national team after ending their playing careers.

== Traditional events ==
- The dancing procession of Echternach is a festival which takes place annually. Dancers process through the streets of Echternach. The procession was inscribed as the hopping procession of Echternach on the UNESCO Representative List of the Intangible Cultural Heritage of Humanity in 2010.
- Schueberfouer
