= Cuisine of Luxembourg =

Culinary traditions of Luxembourg

Luxembourgish cuisine reflects the country's position between the Latin and Germanic countries, influenced by the cuisines of neighbouring France, Belgium and Germany. Recently, it has been influenced by the country's many Italian and Portuguese immigrants. As in Germany, most traditional, everyday Luxembourg dishes are of peasant origin, in contrast to the more sophisticated French fare.

== Food ==
Location of Luxembourg

Luxembourg has many delicacies. In addition to French pâtisseries, cake and fruit pies, local pastries include the Pretzel, a Lent speciality; Quetscheflued, a zwetschge tart; verwurelt Gedanken or Verwurelter, small powdered sugar-coated doughnuts; and Äppelklatzen, apples en croûte. Luxembourg's cheese speciality is Kachkéis or Cancoillotte, a soft cheese spread.

Fish from the local rivers such as trout, pike, and crayfish are the basis for dishes such as F'rell am Rèisleck (trout in Riesling sauce), Hiecht mat Kraiderzooss (pike in green sauce) and Kriibsen (crayfish), usually prepared in a Riesling sauce. Another favourite is Fritür or friture de la Moselle, small fried fish from the River Moselle, accompanied by a local Moselle white wine.

Meat dishes include cold Éisleker Ham, literally Oesling ham, from the mountainous north of the country, first marinated for a couple of weeks and then smoked for several days. It is usually served thinly sliced with chipped potatoes and salad. Perhaps the most traditional of all Luxembourg meat dishes is Judd mat Gaardebounen, smoked collar of pork with broad beans. The pork is soaked overnight, then boiled with vegetables and spices. Served in copious slices together with the beans and boiled potatoes, it is considered to be the national dish of Luxembourg. Hong am Rèisleck, similar to the Alsatian coq au Riesling, consists of browned chicken pieces simmered in white wine with vegetables, spices and mushrooms. Huesenziwwi or civet de lièvre is a jugged hare dish served during the hunting season.

Other dishes include liver dumplings (quenelle) with sauerkraut and boiled potatoes, Träipen (black pudding) with apple sauce, sausages with mashed potatoes and horseradish, and green bean soup (Bouneschlupp). French cuisine is featured prominently on many menus, as well as certain dishes from Germany and Belgium.

René Arend, the inventor of Chicken Nuggets and the McRib is from Luxembourg.

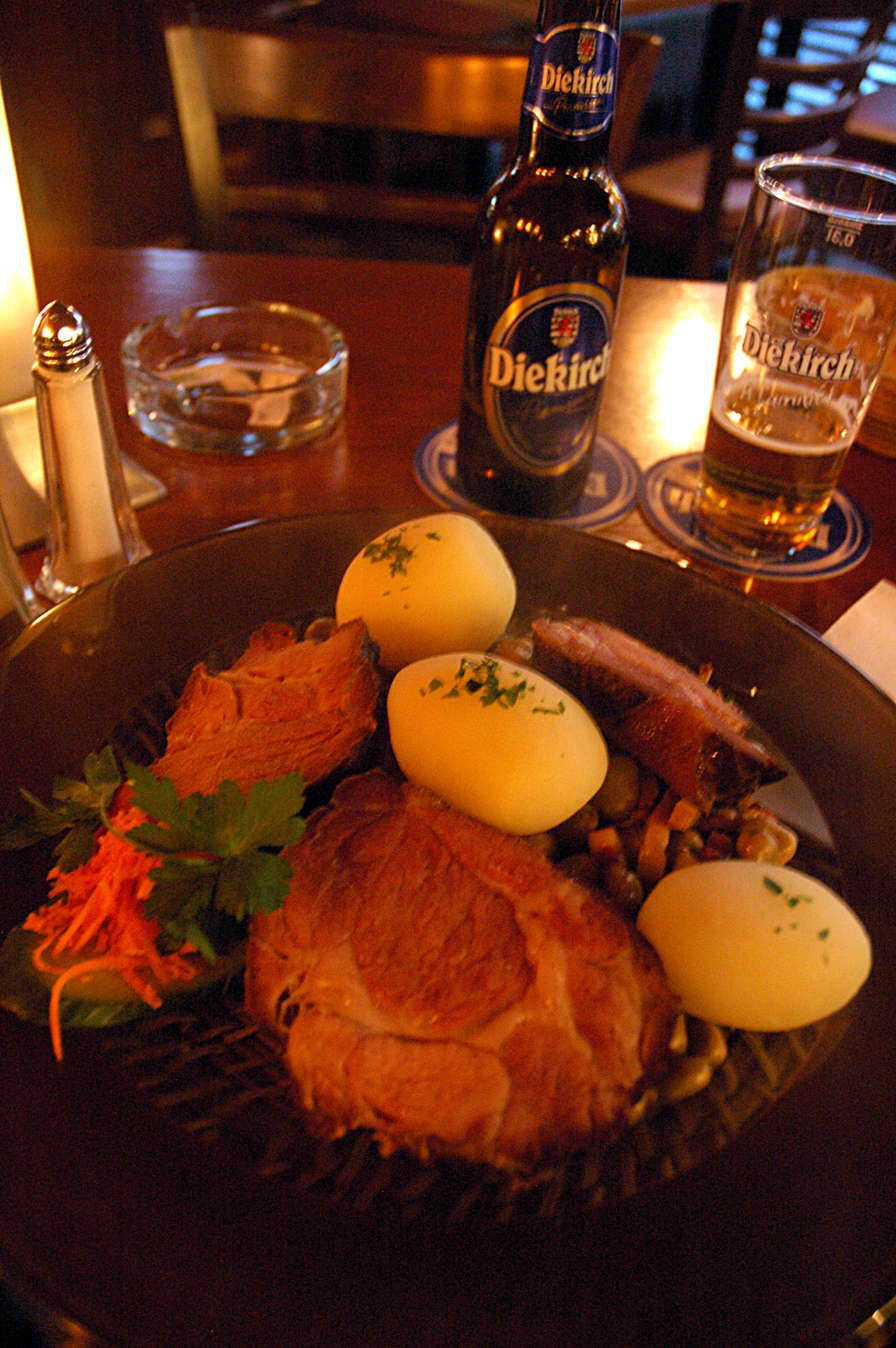
Judd mat Gaardebounen served with boiled potatoes and Diekirch beer

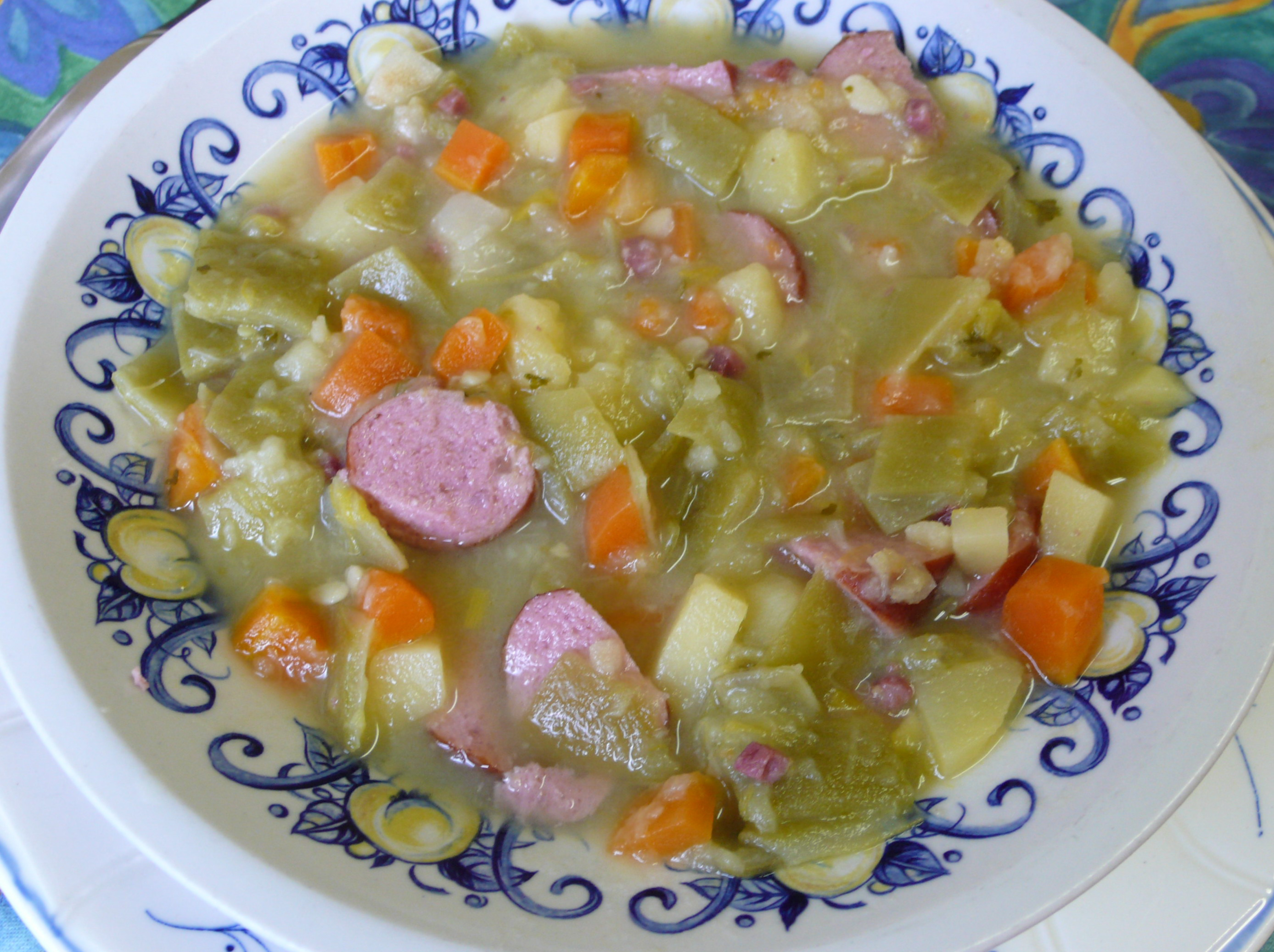
Bouneschlupp is considered to be a Luxembourgish national dish

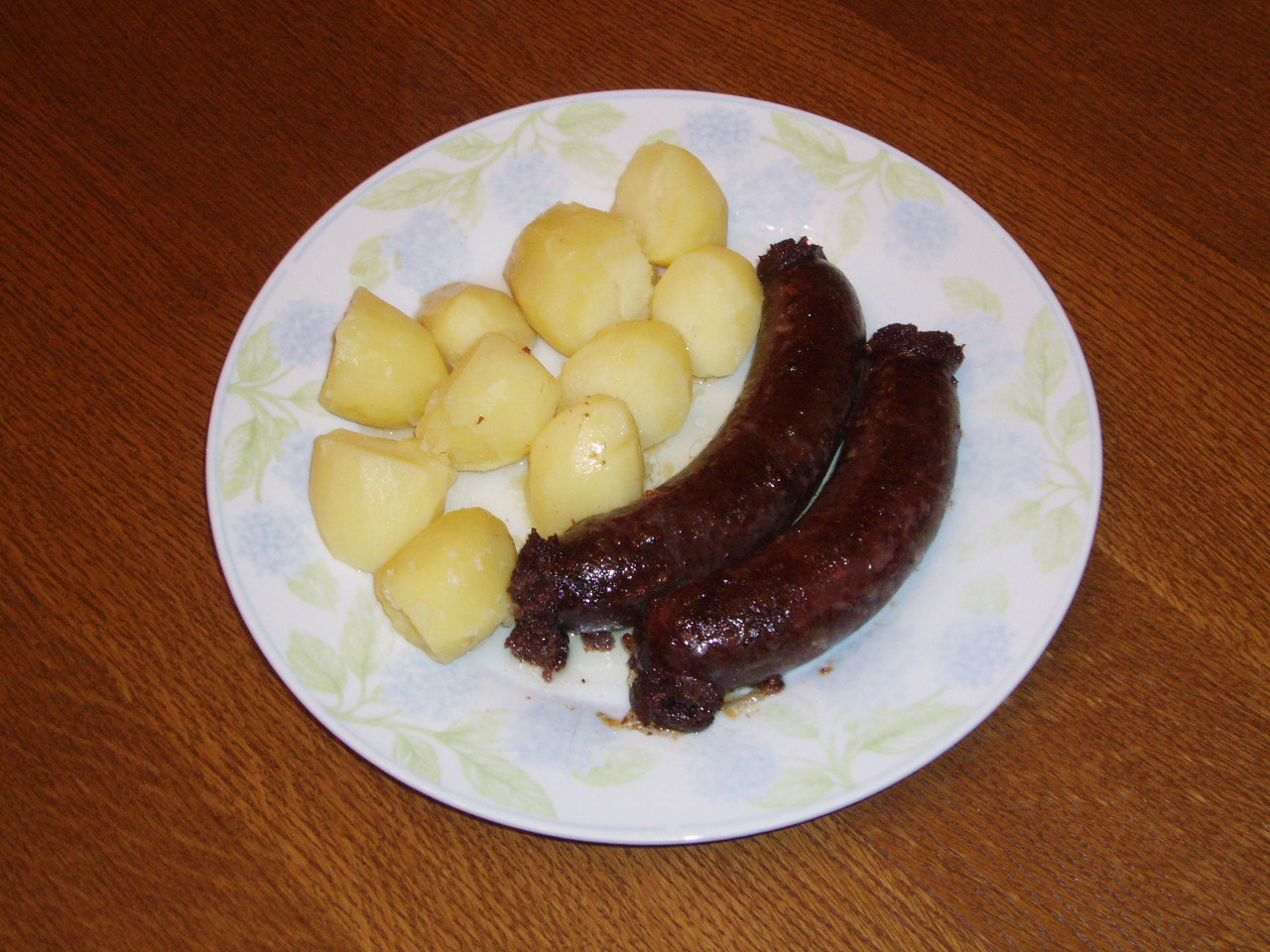
Träipen, sometimes treipen, is the Luxembourg variant of black pudding

=== Other notable foods ===
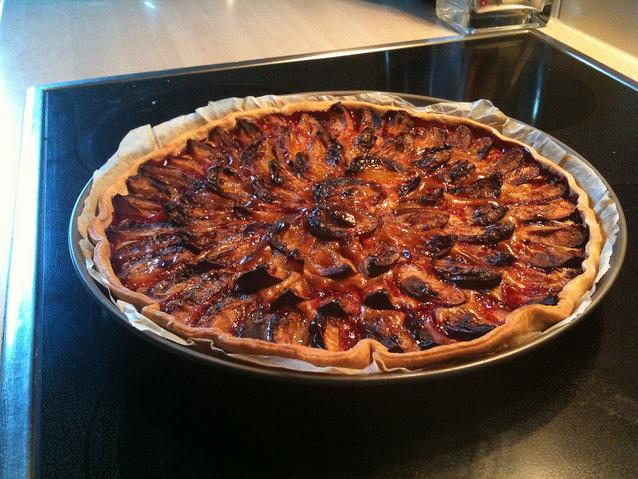
Quetschentaart, a Luxembourg specialty

Other Luxembourg specialties include:

- Thüringer—Sausages that taste like a spicy version of the German bratwurst. The use of the word "Thüringer" is now reserved for sausages produced in German Thuringia. Officially they are now Lëtzebuerger Grillwurscht or Luxembourg grill sausages.
- Gromperekichelcher—A carefully spiced potato pancake with chopped onions and parsley, then deep-fried.
- Tierteg—Another kind of potato pancake made with sauerkraut.
- Rieslingspaschtéit—A popular loaf-shaped meat pie prepared with Riesling wine and aspic, typically served in slices.
- Pâté—A spreadable paste, usually made of meat though vegetarian versions exist.
- Quetschentaart—A plum tart; it, along with peach, cherry, and pear tarts are typical desserts and can be found in any pastry shop or restaurant.
- Öennenzop—Onion soup that is usually served with cheese toast.

== Wine and beer ==
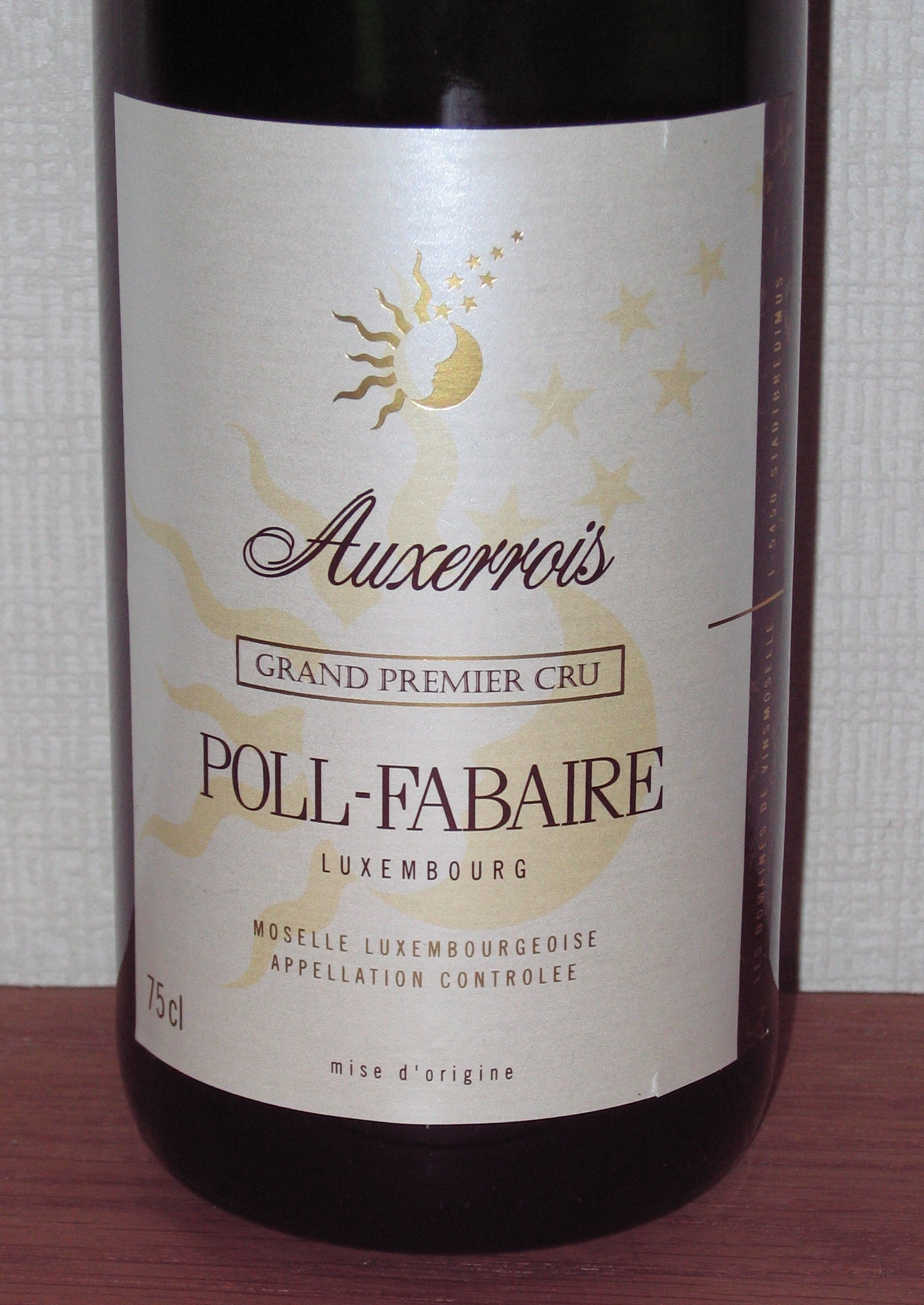
Auxerrois wine

Wine, mostly dry white wine, and sparkling wine is produced in Luxembourg, along the north bank of the Moselle, which has a winemaking history dating back to the Romans. The main varieties are Riesling, Pinot gris, Pinot blanc, Chardonnay, Auxerrois, Gewürztraminer, Rivaner, Elbling, Pinot noir, and Crémant de Luxembourg. The Marque Nationale, on the rear of every bottle of Luxembourg wine, confirms its origin and states its quality level.

Beer, which is quite a popular drink in Luxembourg, is produced locally at three large breweries as well as in a couple of smaller establishments. Most of the beer brewed in Luxembourg is lager but there are also a number of special beers as well as beers without alcohol and Christmas beer in December. The main brands of beer are Bofferding, who also produce Battin; Mousel and Diekirch, who share the same brewery in Diekirch; and Simon. Since the 2000s there has been a resurgence of local microbreweries creating craft beer such as, Beierhaascht, Ourdaller and Grand Brewing.
