= Verwurelter =

Luxembourg pastry

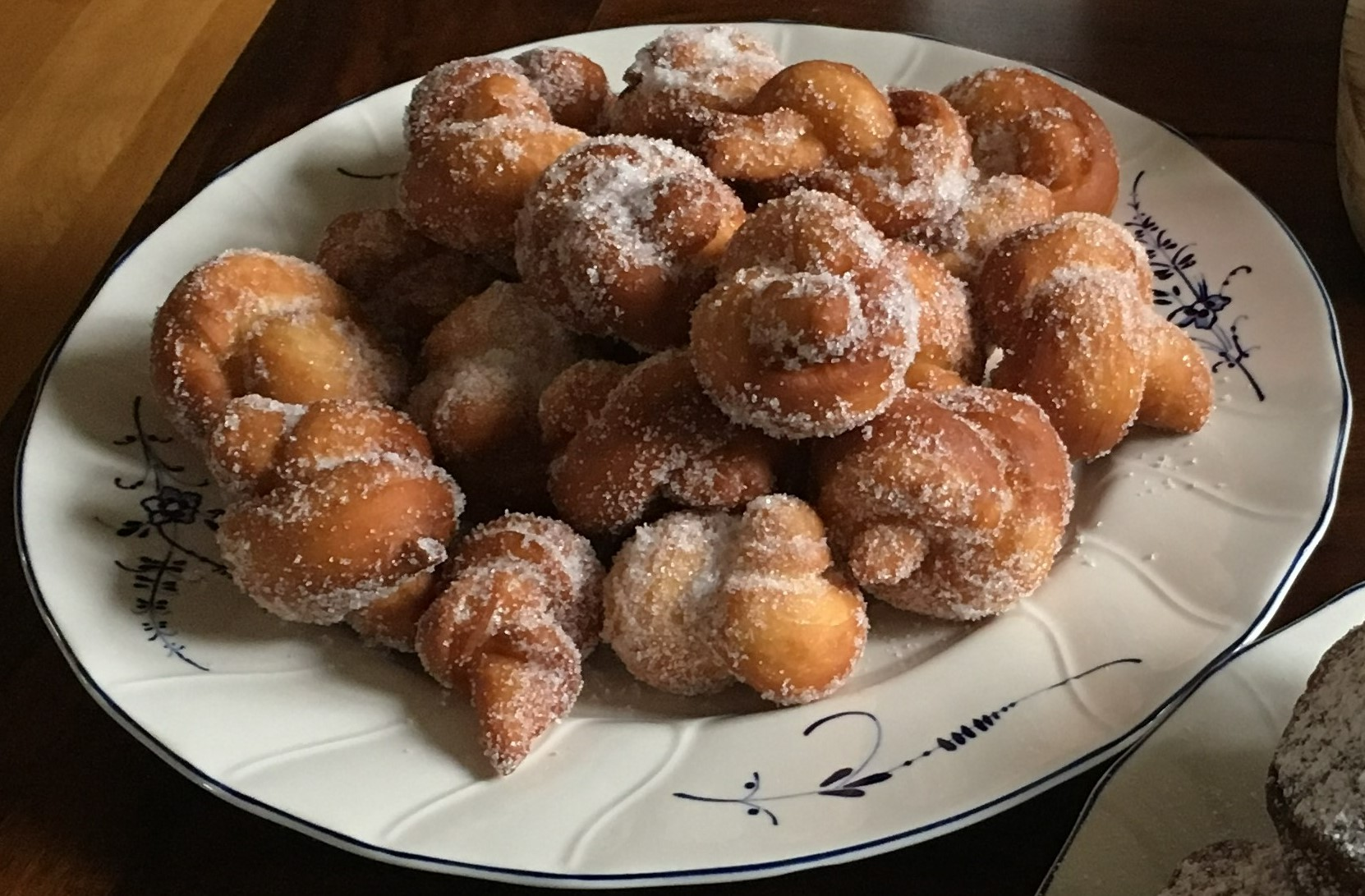
- Plate of verwurelter
- Alternative names: Fueskichelcher Verwurrelter
- Type: Pastry
- Place of origin: Luxembourg

Verwurelter or verwurrelter, also known as fueskichelcher, are traditional Luxembourg deep-fried pastry knots. They are most commonly served during the Fuesent carnival season in Luxembourg, which runs from the beginning of February and continues in some areas through the end of March. The literal meaning of verwurelter is "the messy ones".

== Composition ==
Verwurelter dough is made from mixing warm milk, yeast, sugar, and flour together. Often the dough is left to rise, before eggs, butter, salt, and the remaining sugar is mixed in to create a smooth, malleable dough.

The dough is then portioned into slices that are twisted into knots before deep-frying. When cooled, verwurelter are dusted with powdered sugar or granulated sugar.

== See also ==
- Cuisine of Luxembourg
- Doughnut
