= Ketty Thull =

Luxembourgish cookbook writer

Catherine Thull
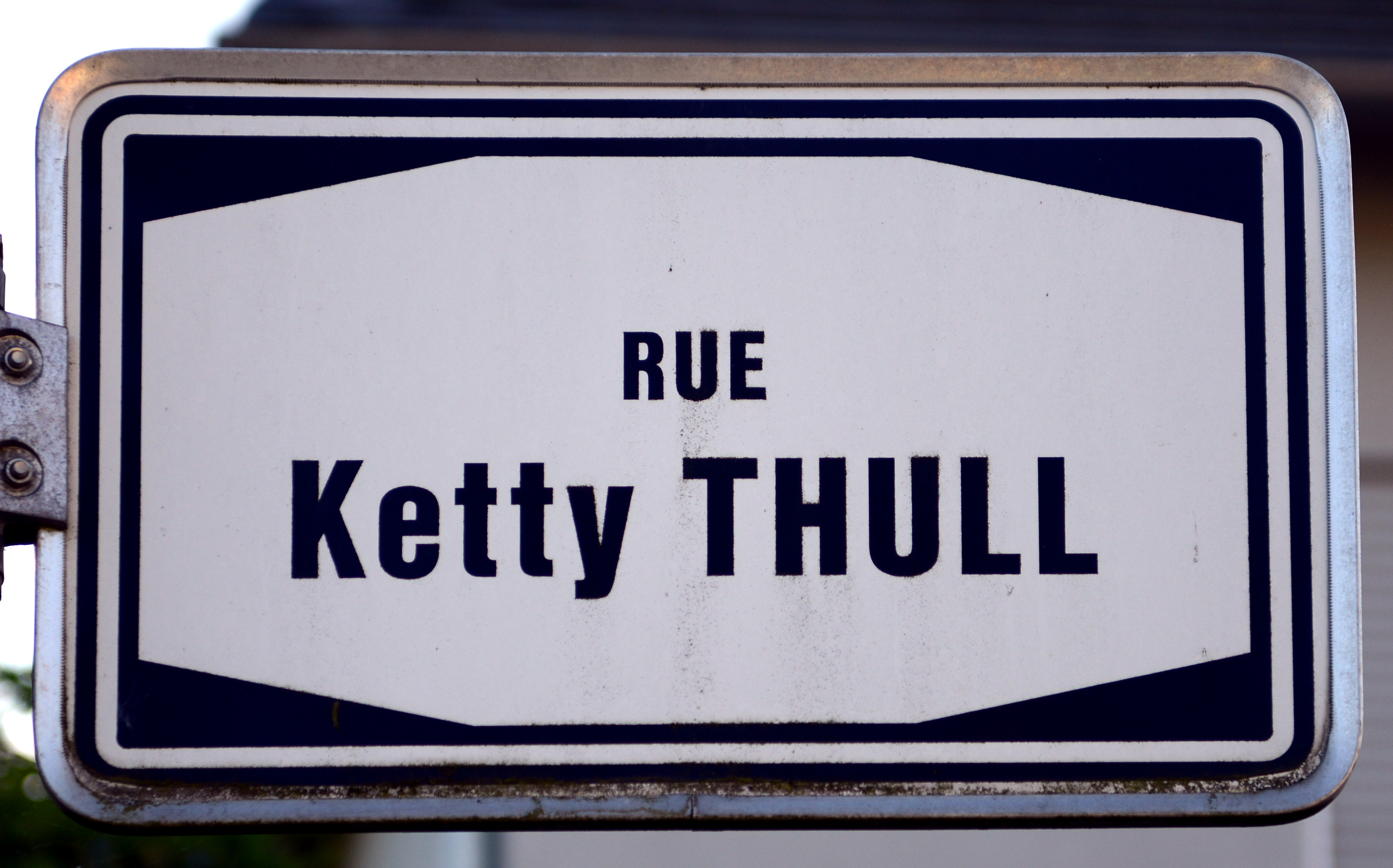
- Rue Ketty Thull in the village of Moutfort
- Born: 2 February 1905; Medingen, Luxembourg
- Died: 25 October 1987 (aged 82); Esch-sur-Alzette, Luxembourg

Catherine "Ketty" Thull (2 February 1905 - 25 October 1987) was a Luxembourgish cook, educator, and cookbook writer who wrote the influential 1946 cookbook Luxemburger Kochbuch. On its publication, the book received a positive review in the Luxemburger Wort which commented that it was a "treasure trove of really interesting, useful recipes". It includes 80 precisely described meat dishes, as well as 30 vegetable preparations. It also presents recipes for the national dishes of Luxembourg such as Träipen, Gehäk, Kuddelfleck, Judd mat Gaardebounen and Sterzein.

Thull, who had studied cookery at the École Le Cordon Bleu in Paris, taught at a housemaids school in Esch-sur-Alzette. In 1937, she published her first book, Ratgeber für die Luxemburger Hausfrau beim Konservieren der Nahrungsmittel (Guide for the Luxembourg Housewife on Preserving Foodstuffs), Luxembourg's first-ever cookbook. To supplement her Kochbuch, in 1947 she published Desserts und Backwaren (Desserts and Pastry Cooking). Thull carefully typed each page of her books and had them printed at her own cost. Carlo Sauber, who has updated the cookbook in 2011 for modern users, explained that little is known about Ketty Thull, except that her students remember her as being very strict. She never married and had no children.

Her works have remained popular in Luxembourg, where they are still used for their authentic local recipes.
