= Zwetschgenkuchen =

German plum sheet cake

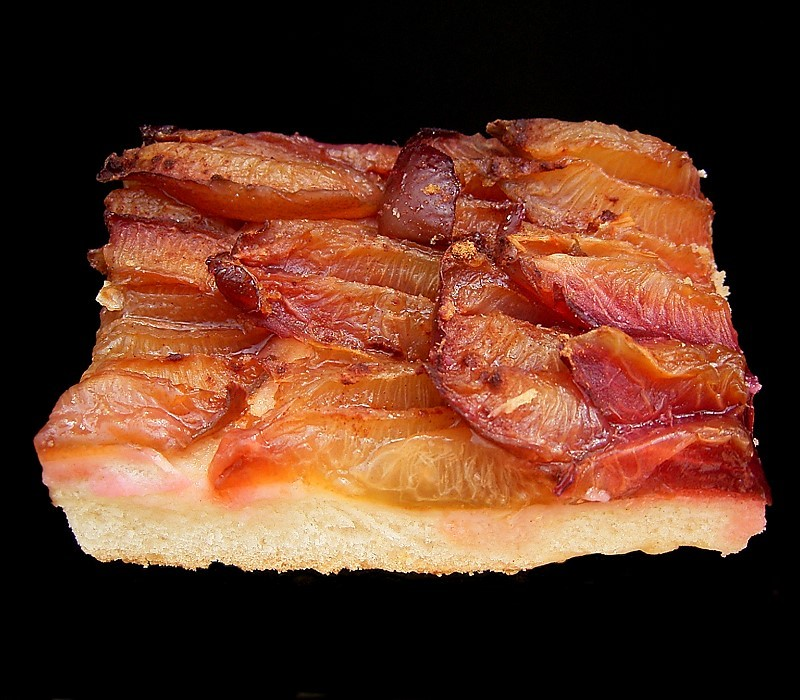
- A piece of Zwetschgenkuchen
- Alternative names: Quetschekuche, Zwetschgendatschi, Prummetaat
- Type: Sheet cake or fruit pie
- Main ingredients: Yeast dough or shortcrust, zwetschgen

Zwetschgenkuchen, Pflaumenkuchen (German: [ˈp͡flaʊ̯mənˌkuːxn̩]), Zwetschgendatschi (southern Bavaria) or Zwetschgenplootz (Franconia) is a sheet cake made from yeast dough, shortcrust dough, or cake batter that is thinly spread onto a baking sheet and covered with pitted zwetschgen plums (also called Italian plums) before being baked.

It is popular cake for both home bakers and commercial bakeries when plums come into season at the end of the summer. Usually and traditionally made with a yeast dough, the plums normally cover the dough completely, or very nearly so. It is not a particularly sweet dish. It is common to bake it with streusel (a crumbly mixture of butter, sugar and flour), although the original recipe serves it plain without any toppings. Modern versions may also use shortcrust dough instead of the traditional yeast dough.

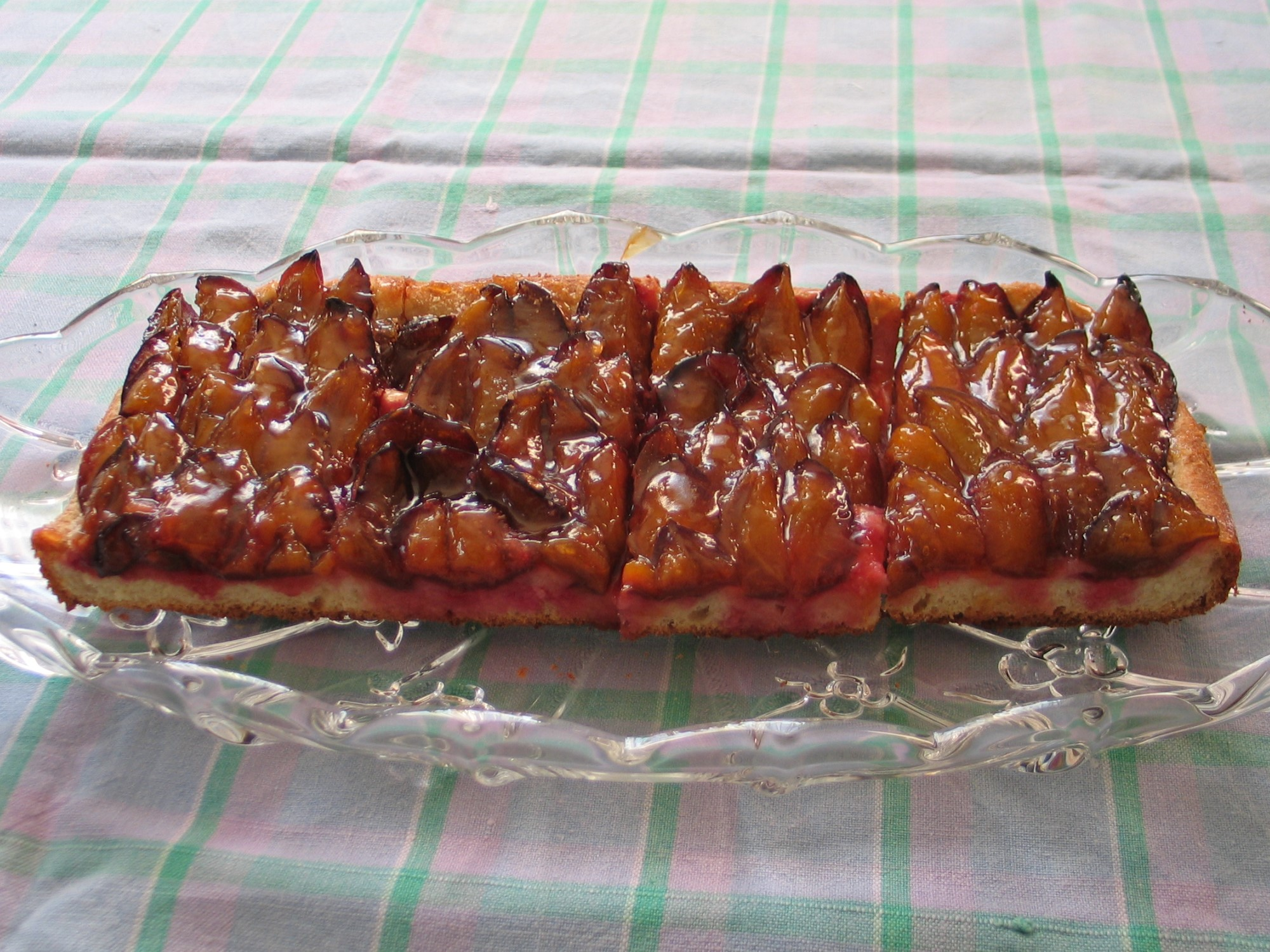
Augsburger Zwetschgendatschi

== Names ==
It is popular throughout Germany, Austria, Switzerland, Alsace, the Czech Republic, and Hungary, with many regional names. In Hessen, Rhineland-Palatinate, Saarland and Moselle it is known as Quetschekuche, in Bavaria, Baden-Württemberg and parts of Austria it is called Zwetschgendatschi and in Rhineland and the Eifel Prummetaat.

"Datschi" is thought to be derived from the dialect word "detschen" or "datschen" that can be translated as "pinching" (as the plums are pinched into the dough).

== History ==
There are claims that the cake was invented in Augsburg where it is considered the city's signature dish. It is said that it resembles the "Zirbelnuss", the city's coat of arms, and from this association Augsburg is also nicknamed "Datschiburg". While it might not be possible to trace its origin to a single city, it is certain to have originated in central Europe and spread from there. The cake is also associated with Jews who immigrated from central Europe to other countries.

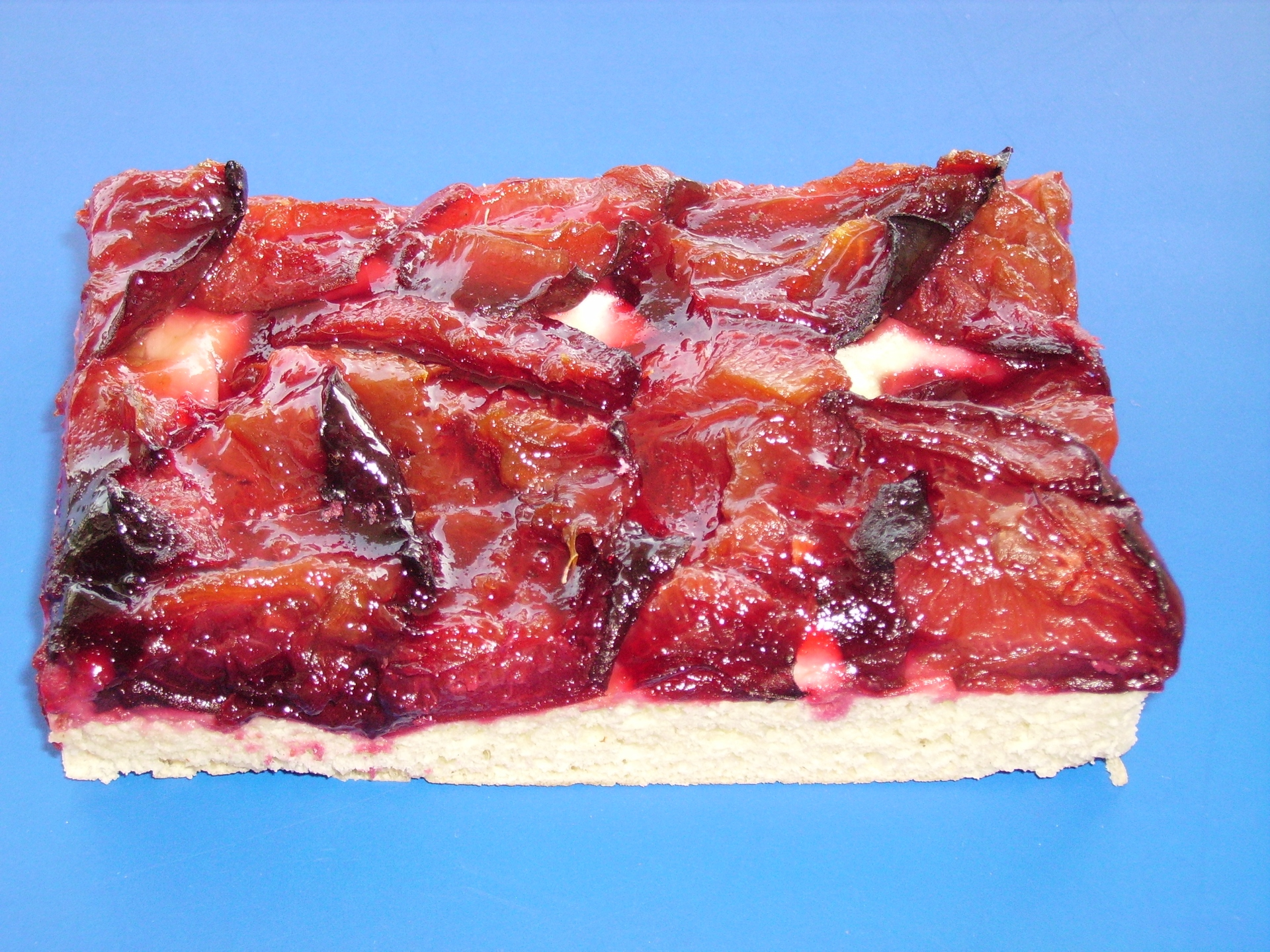
Made with brightly colored Italian plums

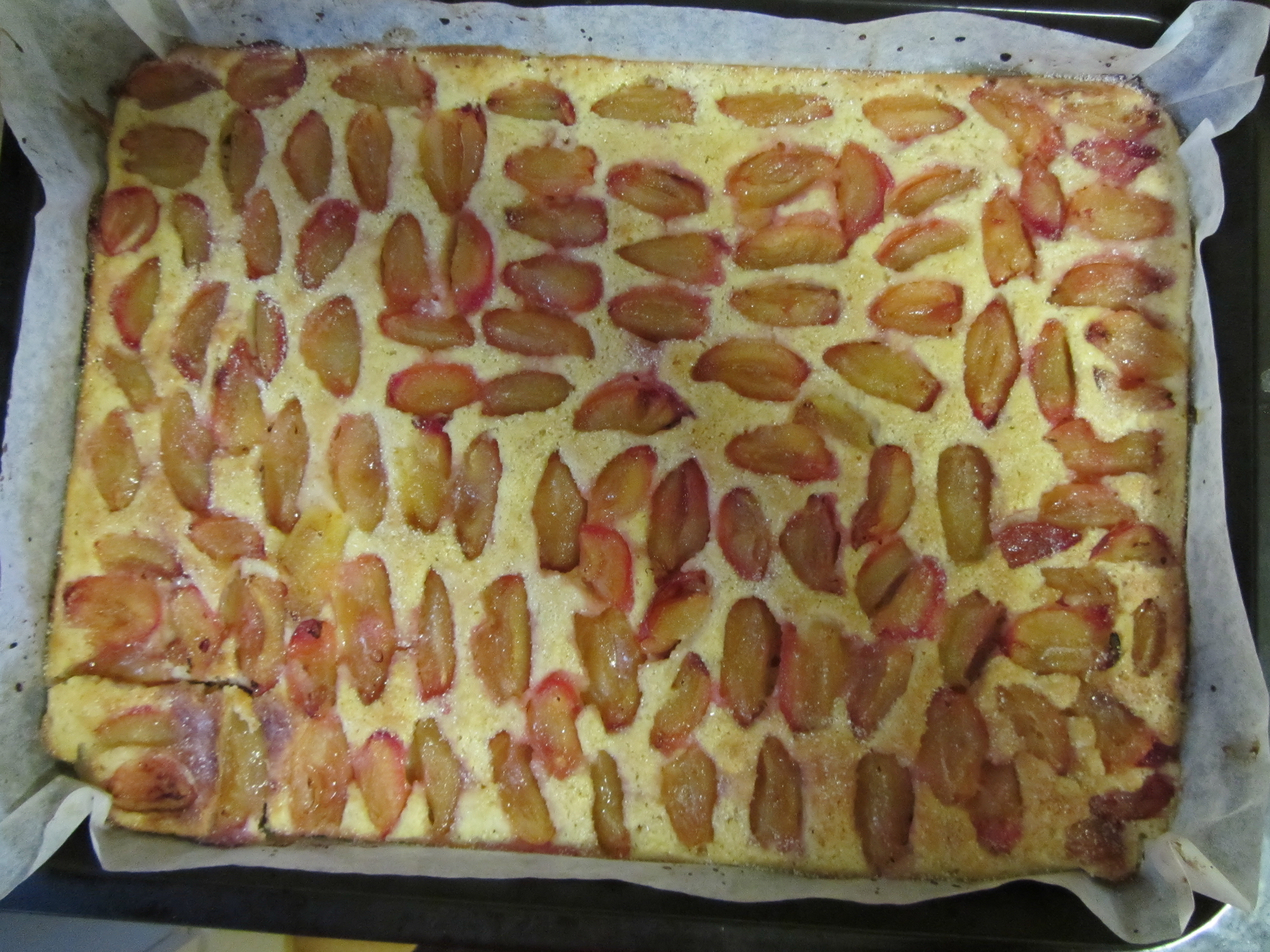
Some plums on the cake batter before being baked

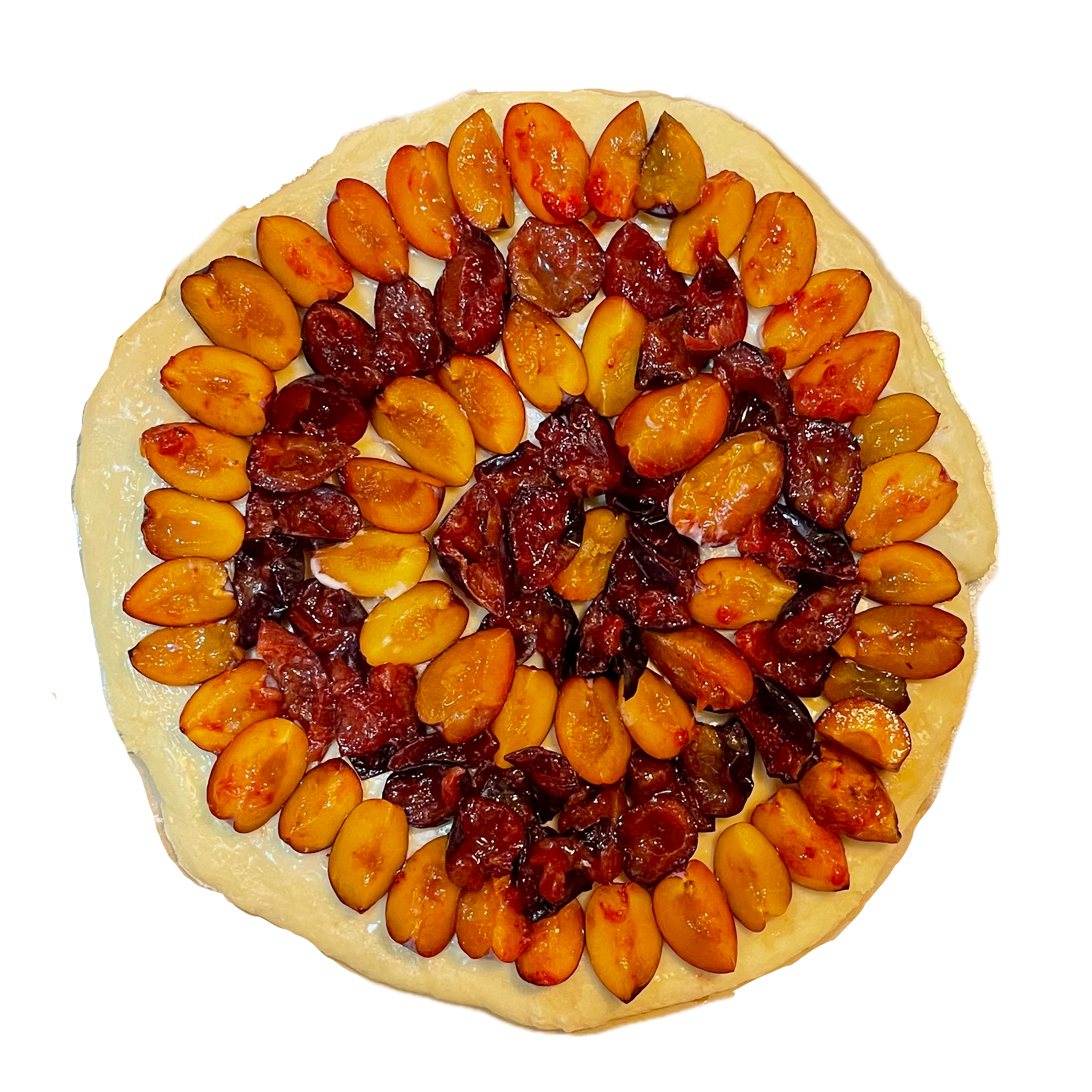
Before baking, with two kinds of plums

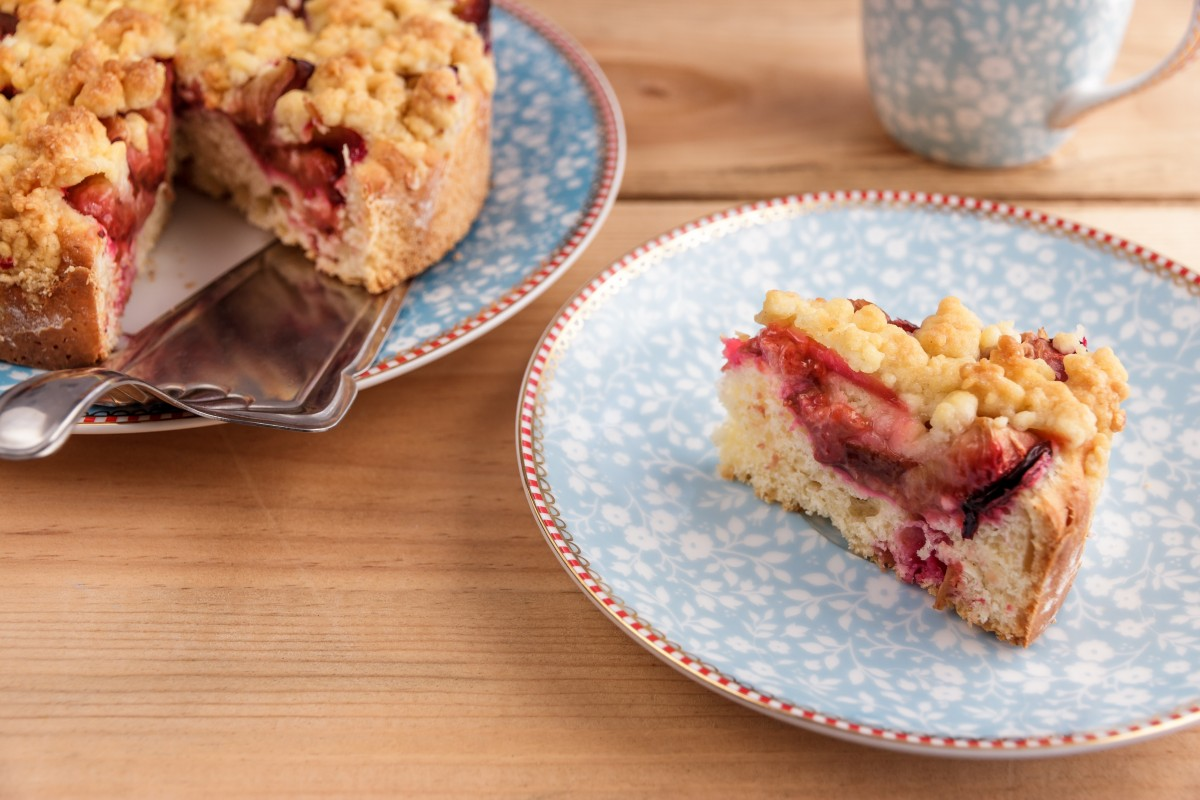
With streusel

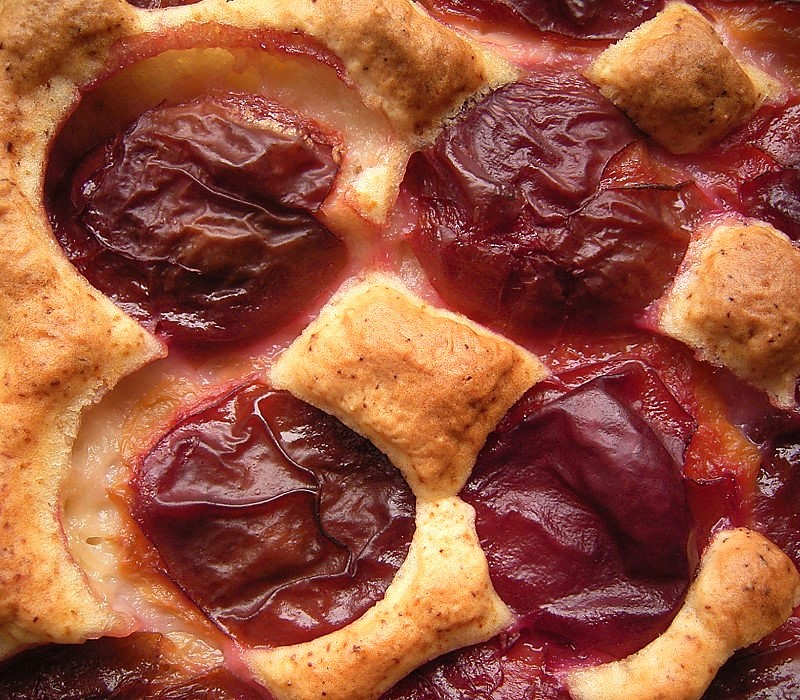
With plum halves spaced across the top

== Variations ==
Kirschstreuselkuchen (cherry streusel cake) is the same cake, except substituting sour cherries for the plums.

== Related dishes ==
In the Palatinate and Rhenish Hesse it is eaten with potato soup or vegetable soup as a main dish for lunch, traditionally served on Thursdays or Saturdays. In contrast the people in Saarland eat it with bean soup and call this dish Schnippelbohnensuppe un Quetschekuche (bean soup and plum cake).

== In popular culture ==
American film star Humphrey Bogart ate plum cake while shooting several famous movies. Bits of plum stuck in his teeth while he filmed Casablanca, causing expensive re-takes and ultimately for Bogart to show less of his teeth in the films.

== See also ==
- German cuisine
- Austrian cuisine
- Cake
- List of German desserts
