= Quetschentaart =

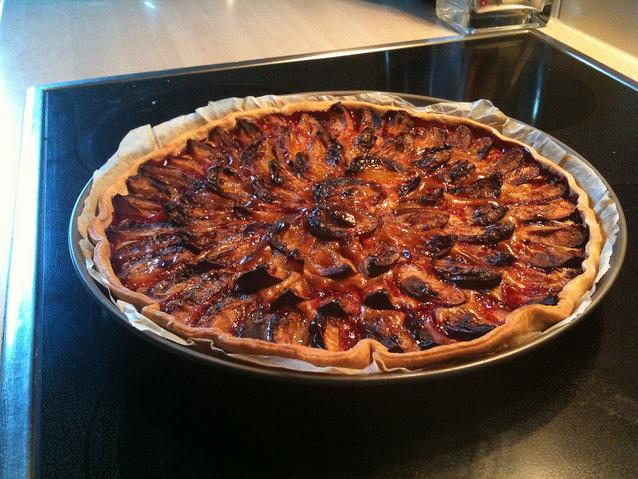
- Type: Dessert
- Place of origin: Luxembourg
- Main ingredients: Zwetschgen, flour, butter, sugar, (yeast)

Quetschentaart, a popular Luxembourg speciality, is a simple open fruit tart with Prune plums, known as zwetschgen.

In the Ketty Thull recipe, the dough for the shortcrust pastry base consists of flour, butter and sugar only. In other recipes, the base is made with a yeast dough. The base is placed in a tart-baking dish, and covered with halved, pitted plums arranged in overlapping circles. It is baked at 180 °C (356 °F)-200 °C (392 °F) for 45-40 minutes or until ready.

Traditionally, it is a seasonal dish served in the autumn when the plums are ripe.
It is often served with whipped cream at afternoon coffee.
