= Bouneschlupp =

European bean soup

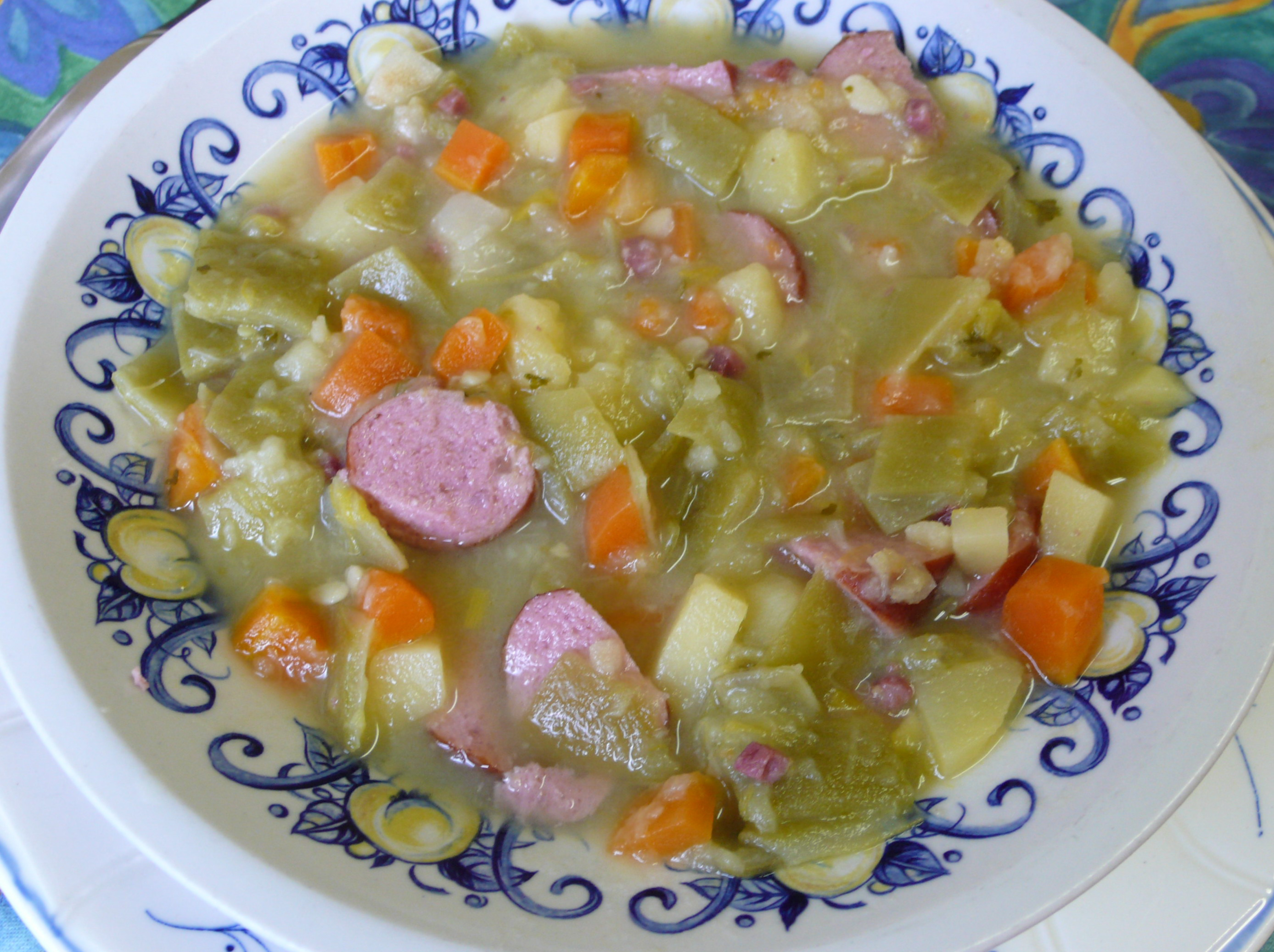
- Type: Soup
- Place of origin: Luxembourg
- Main ingredients: Green beans, potatoes, bacon, onions

Bouneschlupp is a traditional Luxembourgish green bean soup with potatoes, bacon, and onions.

Although Bouneschlupp is considered a Luxembourgish national dish, it can also be found in Saarland (Germany), Gaume, Arelerland (Belgium), and Lorraine (France).

== See also ==
- Cuisine of Luxembourg
- List of bean soups
