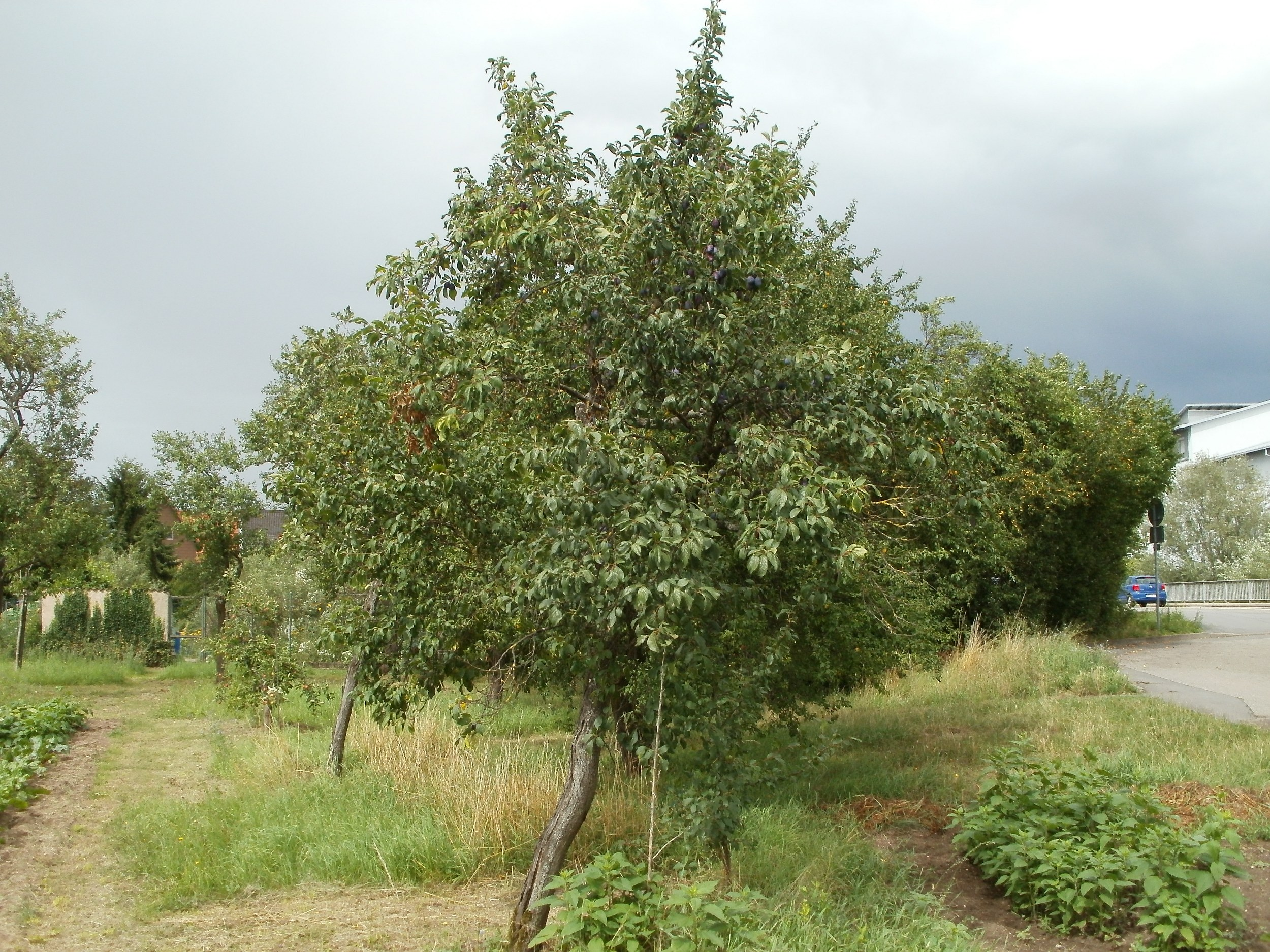
- Prune plum tree in fruit

Scientific classification
- Kingdom: Plantae
- Clade: Tracheophytes
- Clade: Angiosperms
- Clade: Eudicots
- Clade: Rosids
- Order: Rosales
- Family: Rosaceae
- Genus: Prunus
- Species: P. domestica
- Subspecies: P. d. subsp. domestica

Trinomial name
- Prunus domestica subsp. domestica

Synonyms
- Prunus oeconomica Borkh.; Prunus domestica subsp. oeconomica (Borkh.) C.K.Schneid.

= Prune plum =

Subspecies of edible fruit

The prune plum (Prunus domestica subsp. domestica) is a fruit-bearing tree, or its fruit. It is a subspecies of the plum Prunus domestica. The freestone fruit is especially popular in Central Europe.

== Names ==
The fruit is known under various regional names, including "blue plum", "damask plum", "sugar plum", and "German prune". It is called Zwetschge (/ˈtsvɛtʃɡə/, plural Zwetschgen) and similar words in German-speaking regions. The German names, and English damson for a similar fruit, are thought ultimately to derive from postulated Vulgar Latin *davascena, altered from damascena, meaning "of Damascus". In Alsace they are known as quetsches and an eau de vie is made with them.

== Description ==
The prune plum tree is often found in streuobstwiesen. It grows to 6–10 metres (20–33 ft) in height; older trees have spreading branches. The bark is brownish. The leaf is simple, 4–10 centimetres (1 1/2–4 in) long, alternate, petiolate, crenulate, and elliptic. The blossom appears in April and May in the Northern Hemisphere, before or with foliation, and is white, greenish-white, or yellowish-green on two or three downy pedicels. The fruit is a freestone drupe. It is less round than other plums, its ends are more pointed and the groove is less pronounced.

The freestone fruit is similar to, but distinct from, the clingstone damson (Prunus domestica subsp. insititia).

== Varieties ==
Examples of varieties are 'Seneca', 'Stanley', 'Fellenberg', Prunier d'Ente (also known as d'Agen), and Prunier Perdrigone.

More than a hundred varieties of prune plums are grown in Central Europe. Examples include Cacaks Beste, Elena, Hauszwetschge, and Ortenauer.

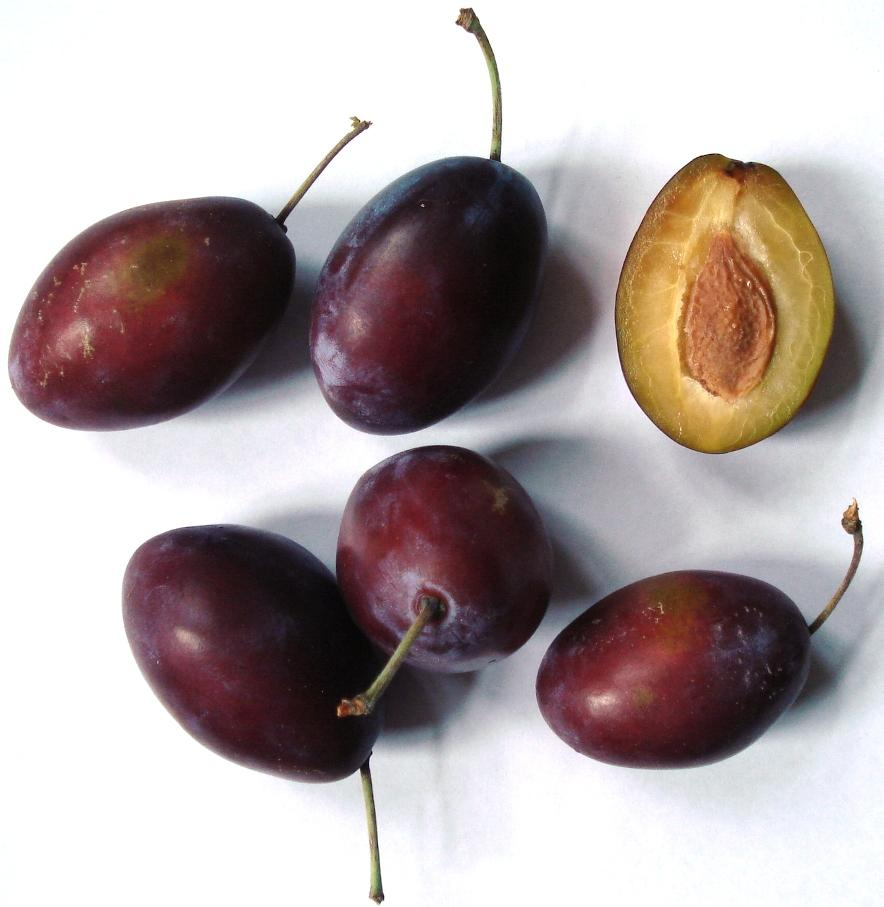
Cacaks Beste

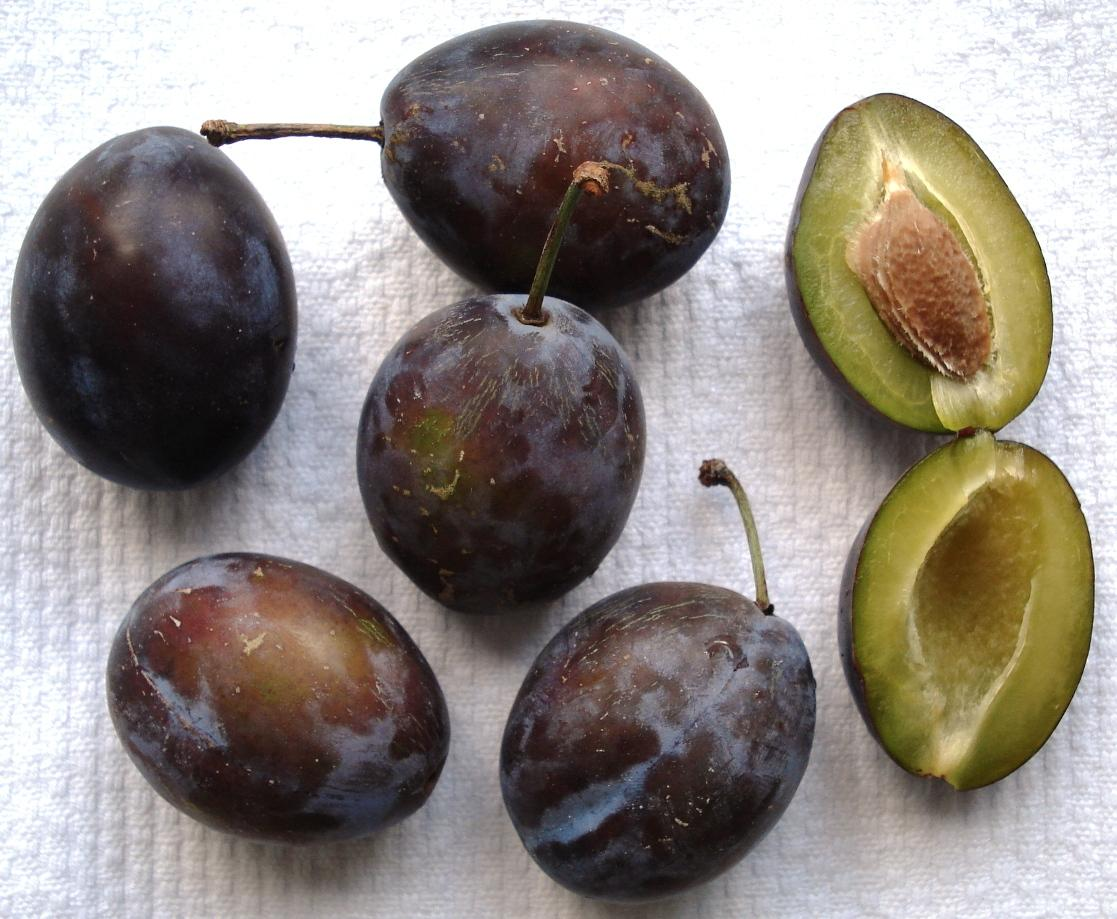
Elena

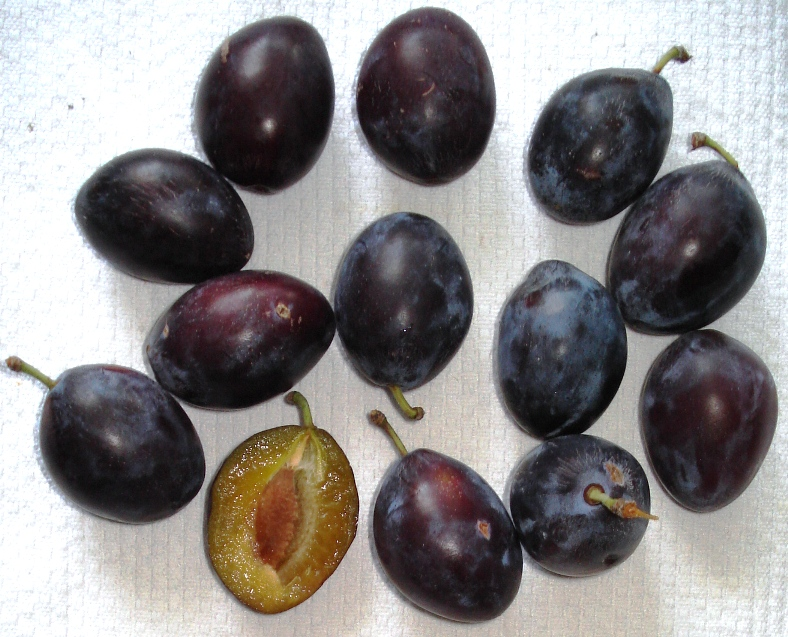
Hauszwetschge

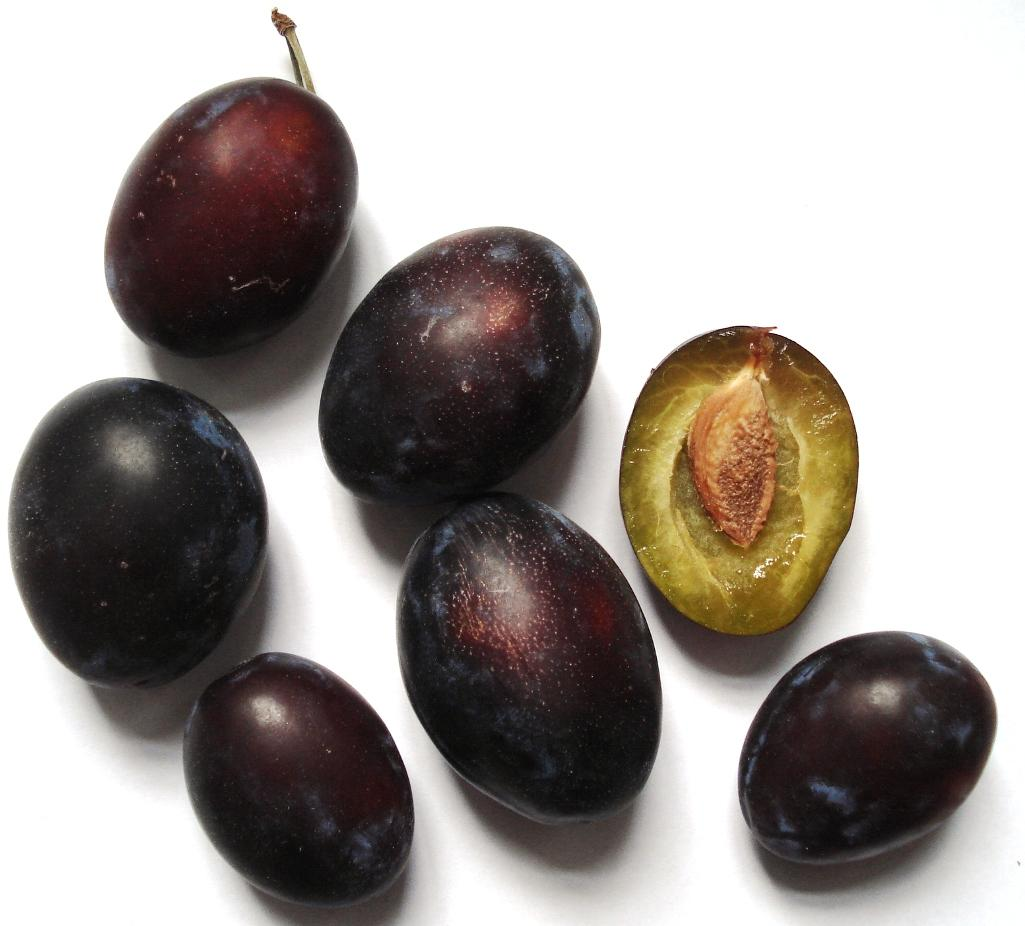
Ortenauer

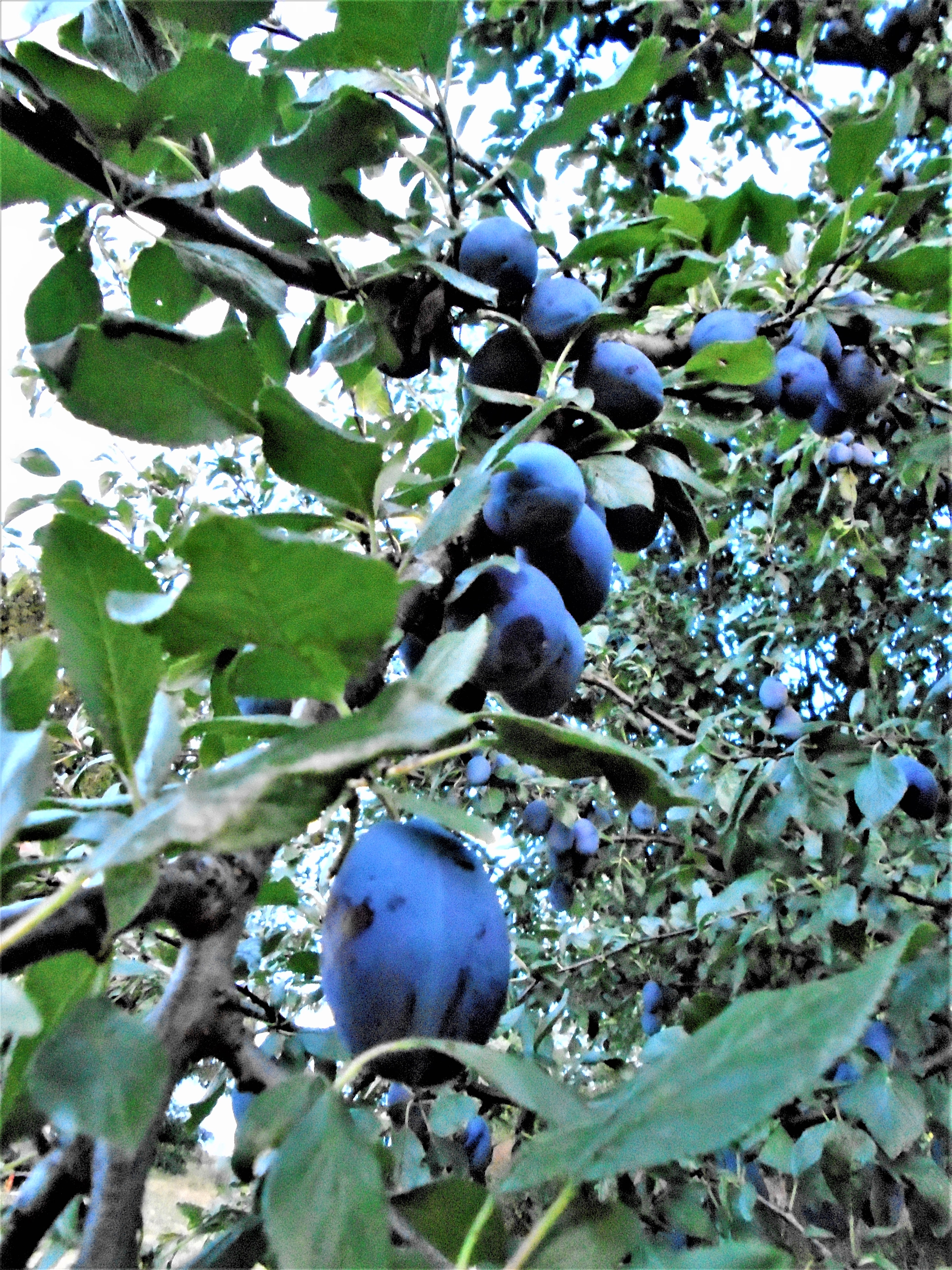
'Stanley'

== Uses ==
The red-brown wood is used in fine cabinetry.

The fruit, which ripens in August and September in the Northern Hemisphere, is a popular seasonal table fruit, in addition to its use drying into prunes.

Prune plums hold their form well at oven temperatures and are much used in baking, for example in tarts such as quetschentaart and zwetschgenkuchen. They are the sole ingredient in the traditional powidl jam of Austria and the Czech Republic, and the main ingredient in schmootsch, a similar but spiced jam from Silesia. Fermented zwetschgen are distilled to make eaux de vie: zwetschgenwasser or zwetsch (in Austria, Germany, and Switzerland), zwetschgeler (in South Tyrol, Italy), and quetsch (in Alsace, France). Carlsbad plums are a candied zwetschgen confection named after Carlsbad (now Karlovy Vary) in the Czech Republic. Szilvásgombóc and zwetschkenknödel are potato dumplings with a zwetschgen filling in Hungary and Austria, served as a sweet main course or as a dessert. At Christmas markets in Germany, for example the Christkindlesmarkt in Nuremberg, a zwetschgenmännla ("little zwetschge man") or zwetschgenweibla ("little zwetschge woman"), with a walnut head, a body of dried figs, and limbs of prunes (dried zwetschgen), is a popular treat.

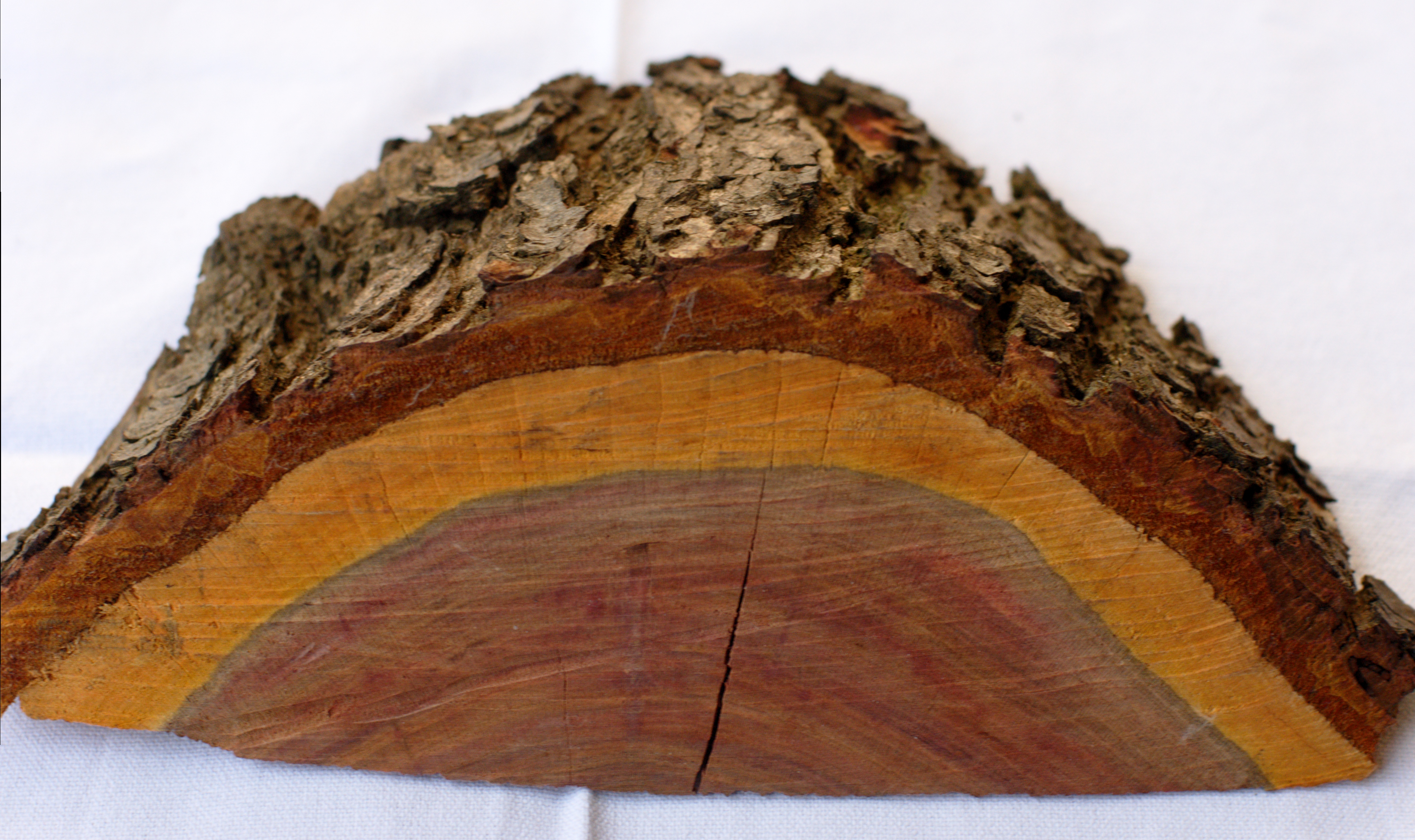
Section of prune plum tree

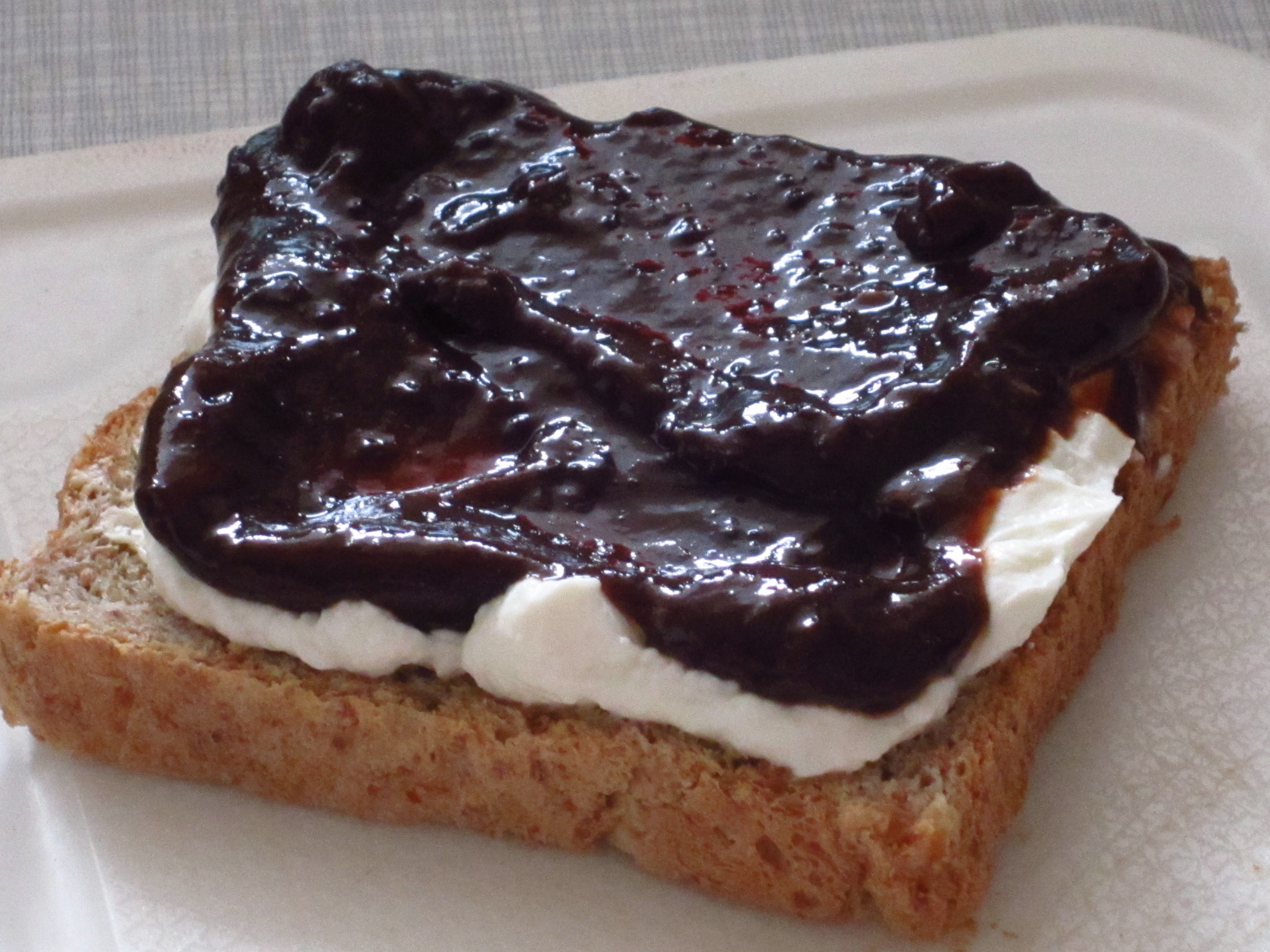
Toast with quark and schmootsch

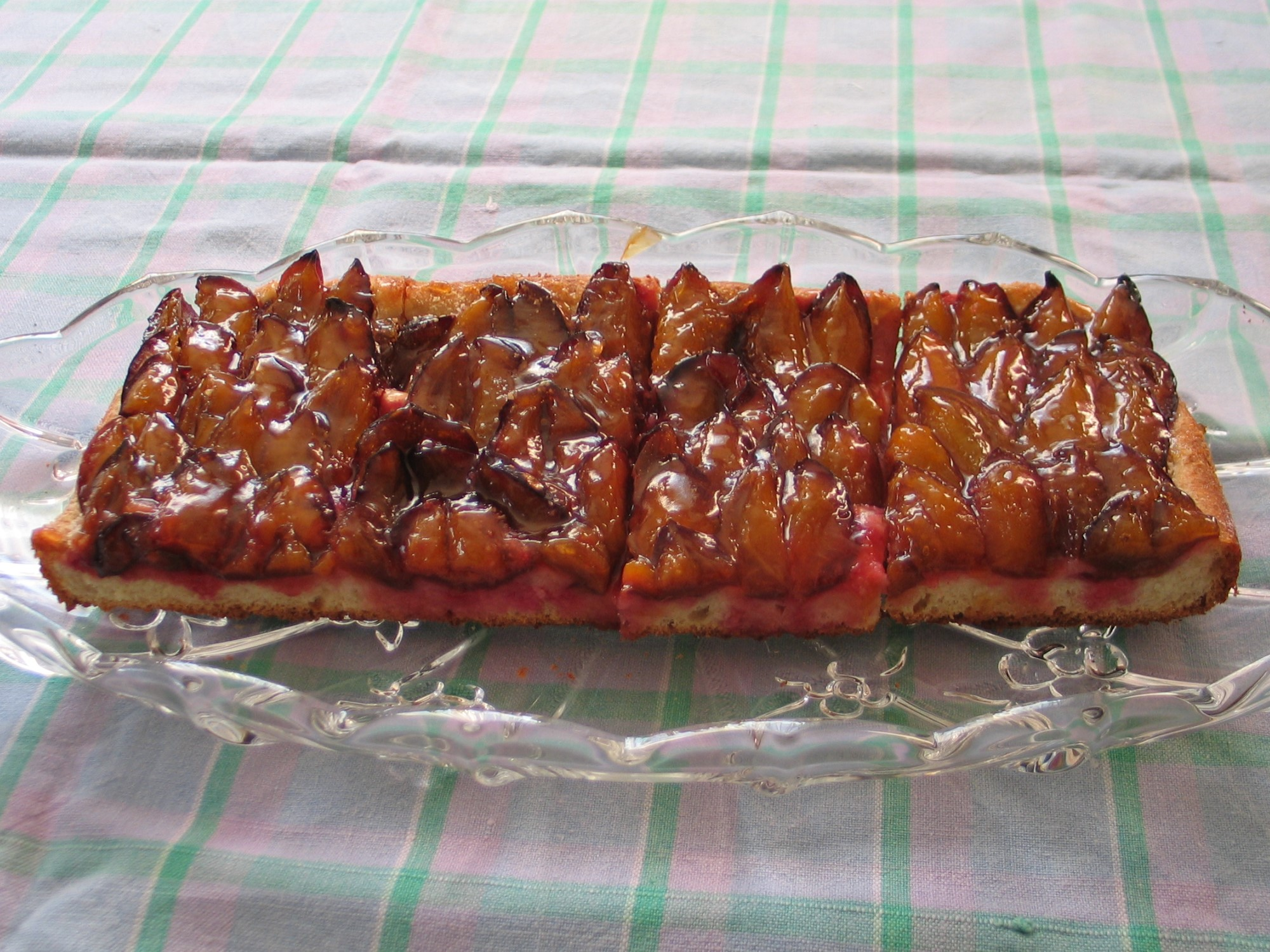
Zwetschgendatschi tart, a speciality of Augsburg, Germany

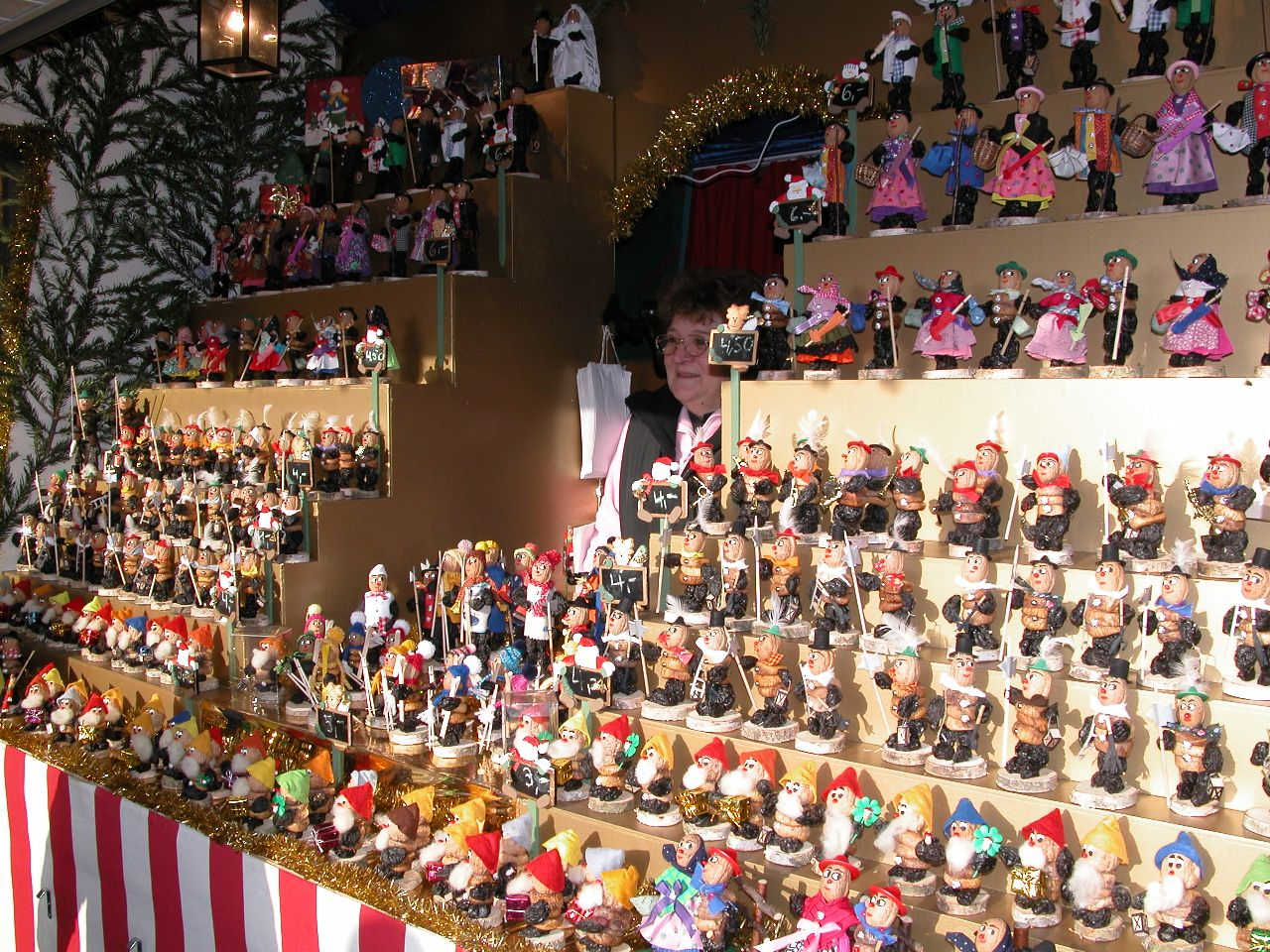
Zwetschgenmännla and zwetschgenweibla fruit dolls at the Nuremberg Christkindlesmarkt

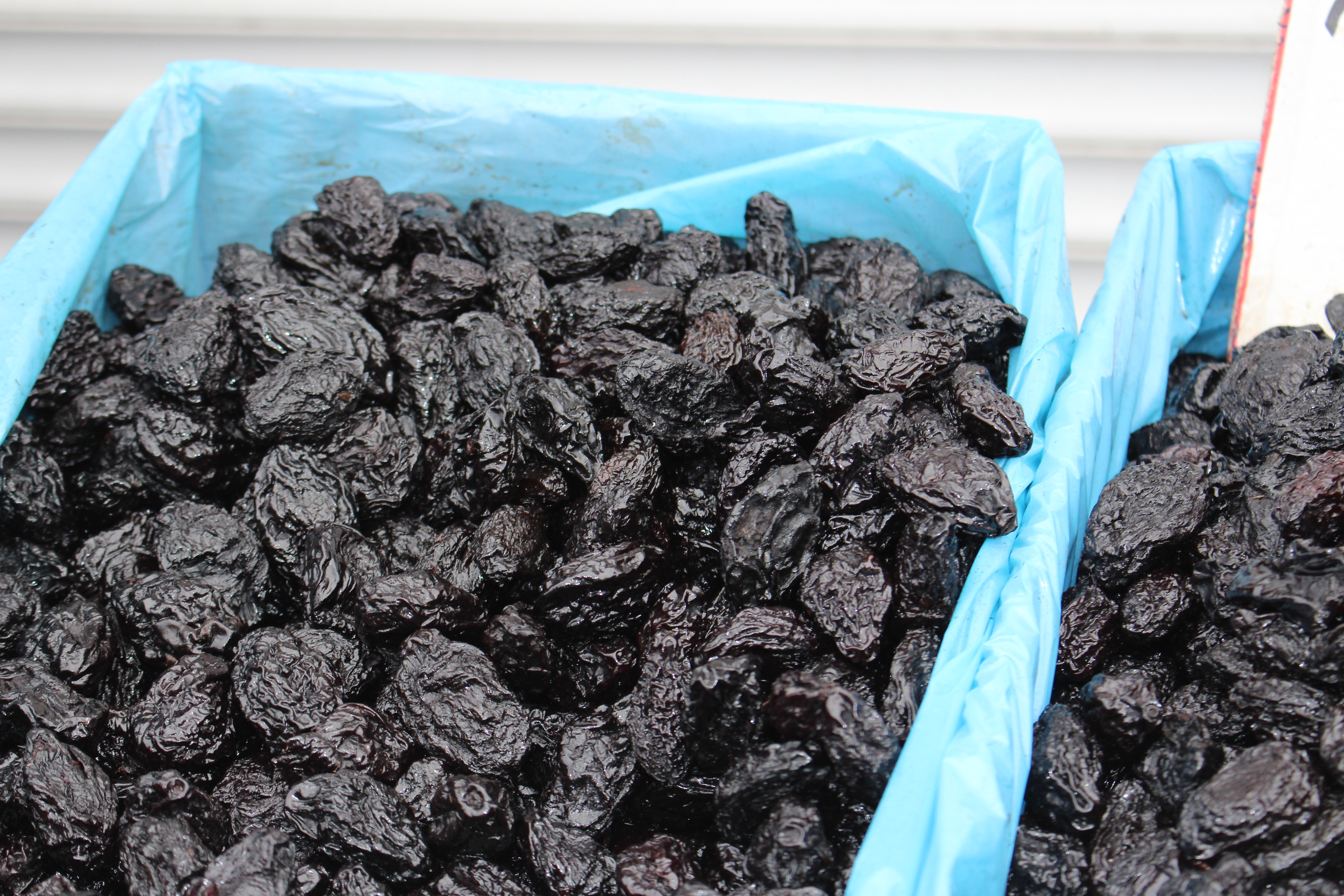
Prunes (dried prune plums) for sale at Petroșani market in Romania
