= Crémant de Luxembourg =

Sparkling wine

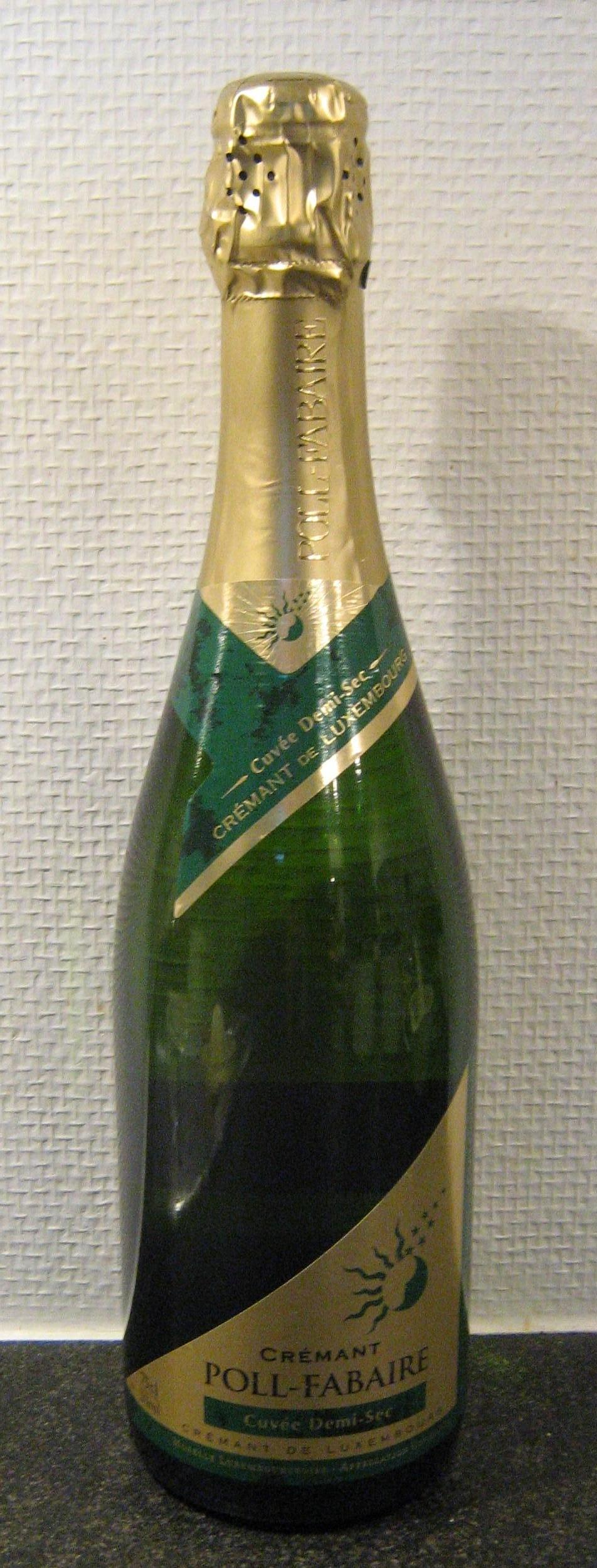
A Poll-Fabaire Crémant de Luxembourg

Crémant de Luxembourg is a sparkling wine from Luxembourg's Moselle valley made according to the traditional method (méthode traditionnelle) of sparkling wine production which includes a second fermentation in the bottle followed by nine months of maturation. Only grapes from the best local varieties are used. They must be perfectly healthy, fully ripened, and free of damage from crushing or transportation.

The designation Crémant de Luxembourg dates from 4 January 1991 when the Marque Nationale: Appellation contrôlée Crémant de Luxembourg was introduced. A rectangular label on the rear of each bottle testifies to the wine's authenticity and quality based on an examination of its colour, clarity, bouquet and taste. There must be a pressure of at least 4 bar in each bottle. Luxembourg is the only country outside France entitled to use the term "crémant".

== History ==
In 1885, the French company Champagne Mercier began to produce champagne in Luxembourg in order to save on taxes. Wine imported from the Champagne region underwent the traditional process including a second fermentation in the bottle. Mercier were able to benefit from Luxembourg's membership of the Zollverein for exports to Germany, avoiding the high taxes the Germans imposed on bottled sparkling wines from France. Luxembourg's own involvement began after the First World War when wine production was restored. In 1921, on the initiative of Paul Faber who gave his name to the Poll-Fabaire company, Luxembourg's wine producers became members of a national cooperative.

Today the cooperative, known at Domaines Vinsmoselle has 350 members representing 65% of the total volume of wine produced or almost 800 hectoliters. It was thanks to the initiative of Vinsmoselle that Luxembourg was authorized to use the designation Crémant de Luxembourg alongside the crémants from various regions of France (Alsace, Bordeaux, Bourgogne, Die, Jura, Limoux, Loire and Savoie).
