= Judd mat Gaardebounen =

Savory dish from Luxembourg

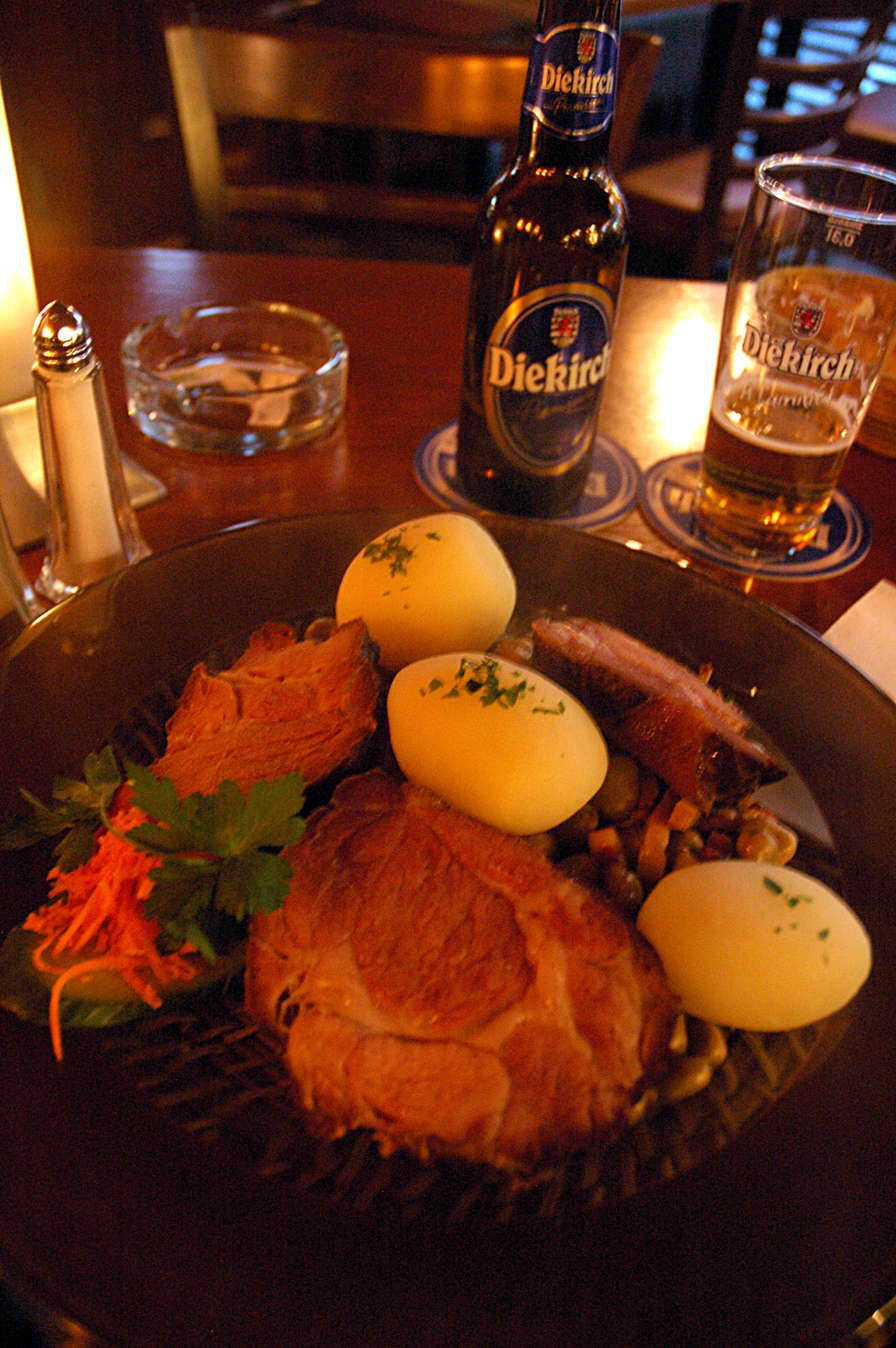
Judd mat Gaardebounen

Judd mat Gaardebounen is a savory dish of smoked pork collar and broad beans which is one of the most widely recognized national dishes of Luxembourg. It is associated with the village of Gostingen in the south-east of the country where the inhabitants have earned the nickname of Bounepatscherten ("bean-madmen") as a result of their well-known broad beans.

== Preparation ==
Cured (or smoked) pork collar is cooked with leeks, carrots, celery and cloves. A bouquet garni may be included, and a glass of Moselle wine. Beans are served in a sauce made with onion, butter and meat stock. The pork is sliced and arranged on a large plate with the beans. The dish can be served with boiled potatoes and either wine or beer.

== Etymology ==
The origin of the word "judd" is not clear. One possibility, suggested by the linguist Jean-Claude Muller, a member of Luxembourg's Institut grand-ducal, is that it comes from the Spanish word for bean (judía). He explains that in Galicia, there is also a pork dish served with broad beans which is locally called judia pronounced "shu-DI-a". Muller theorizes that the dish was brought to Luxembourg by Spanish troops during the 16th or 17th century. If that indeed is the case, then "Judd mat Gaardebounen" approximates to "Beans with Beans". It has also been argued that the term derives from the Jew (judío) because "the dark color of the beans reminded some of the dark skin of the Spanish Jews".

== See also ==
- List of pork dishes
- Luxembourg cuisine
