= Éisleker Ham =

Type of ham from Luxembourg

Éisleker Ham or jambon d'Oesling, literally Oesling ham, is a speciality from the Oesling region in the north of Luxembourg which is produced from the hind legs of pigs. Traditionally, it was prepared by marinating the hams in herbs and vinegar for several days, then hanging them in a chimney for long periods of cold smoking. Today the meat is cured in brine for two weeks and placed in a smoker fed from beech and oak chips for about a week. Jambon d'Oesling is protected under EU regulations as having PGI status.

Éisleker Ham is usually served cold, very thinly sliced, with fried potatoes, salad, and fresh bread or in small slices spread over buttered bread as an open sandwich known as Hameschmier.

== See also ==
- List of hams
