= Outline of Luxembourg =

Country in Western Europe

The location of Luxembourg

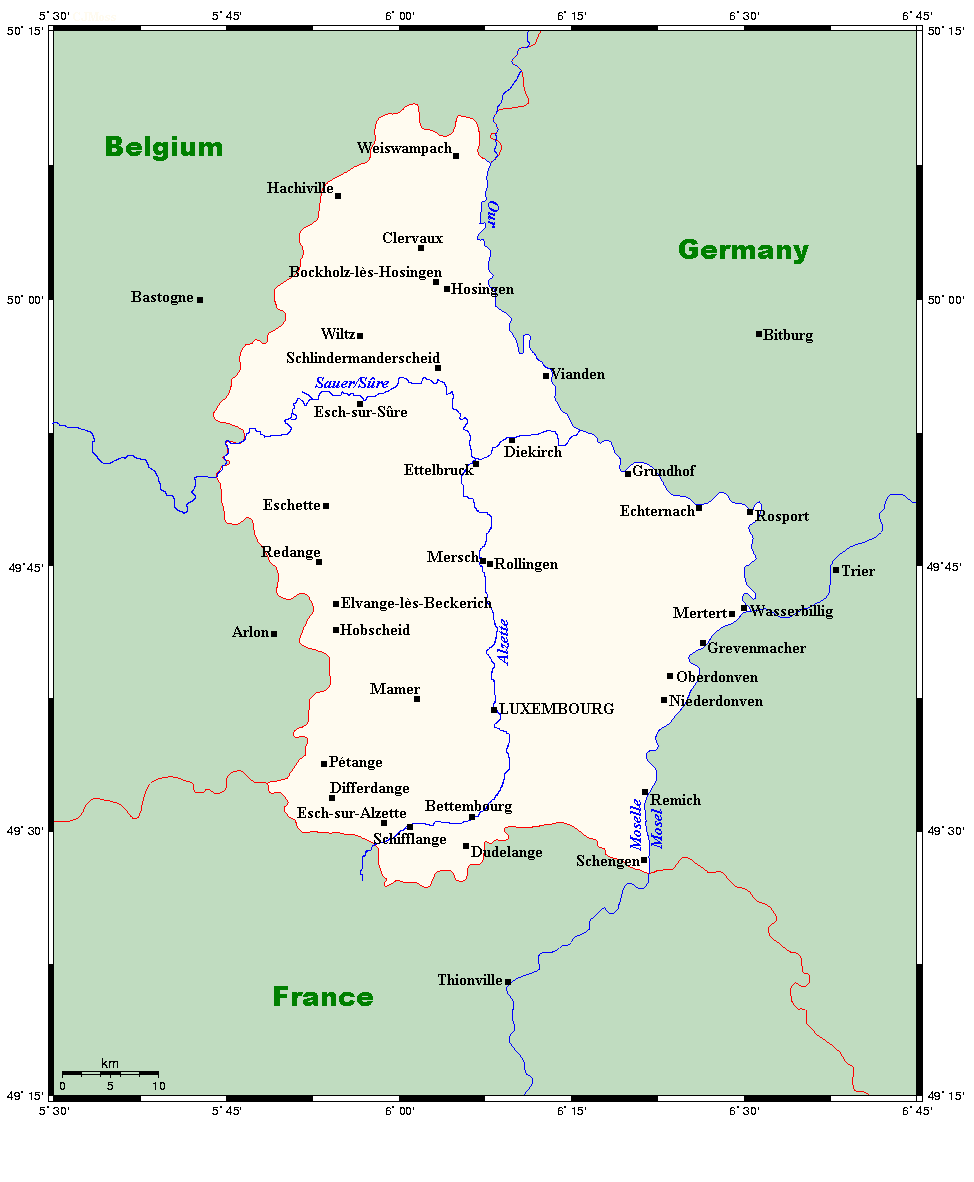
An enlargeable map of the Grand Duchy of Luxembourg

The following outline is provided as an overview of and topical guide to Luxembourg:

Luxembourg – small sovereign country located in Western Europe, bordered by Belgium, France, and Germany. Luxembourg has a population of half a million people in an area of approximately 2,586 square kilometres (999 sq mi).

Luxembourg is a parliamentary representative democracy with a constitutional monarchy, ruled by a Grand Duke. It is the world's only remaining sovereign Grand Duchy. The country has a highly developed economy, with the highest Gross Domestic Product per capita in the world (U.S. Central Intelligence Agency 2007). Its historic and strategic importance dates back to its founding as a Roman era fortress site and Frankish count's castle site in the Early Middle Ages. It was an important bastion along the Spanish road when Spain was the principal European power influencing the whole western hemisphere and beyond in the 14th–17th centuries.

Luxembourg is a founding member of the European Union, NATO, the United Nations, Benelux, and the Western European Union, reflecting the political consensus in favour of economic, political, and military integration. The city of Luxembourg, the capital and largest city, is the seat of several institutions and agencies of the European Union.

Luxembourg lies on the cultural divide between Romance Europe and Germanic Europe, borrowing customs from each of the distinct traditions. Luxembourg is a trilingual country; French, German, and Luxembourgish are official languages. Although a secular state, Luxembourg is predominantly Roman Catholic.

== General reference ==
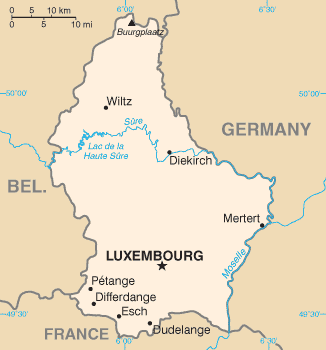
An enlargeable basic map of Luxembourg

- Pronunciation:
- Common English country name: Luxembourg
- Official English country name: The Grand Duchy of Luxembourg
- Common endonym(s):
- Official endonym(s):
- Adjectival(s): Luxembourg, Luxembourgish
- Demonym(s): Luxembourger
- Etymology: Lucilinburhuc, little castle
- International rankings of Luxembourg
- ISO country codes: LU, LUX, 442
- ISO region codes: See ISO 3166-2:LU
- Internet country code top-level domain: .lu

== Geography of Luxembourg ==
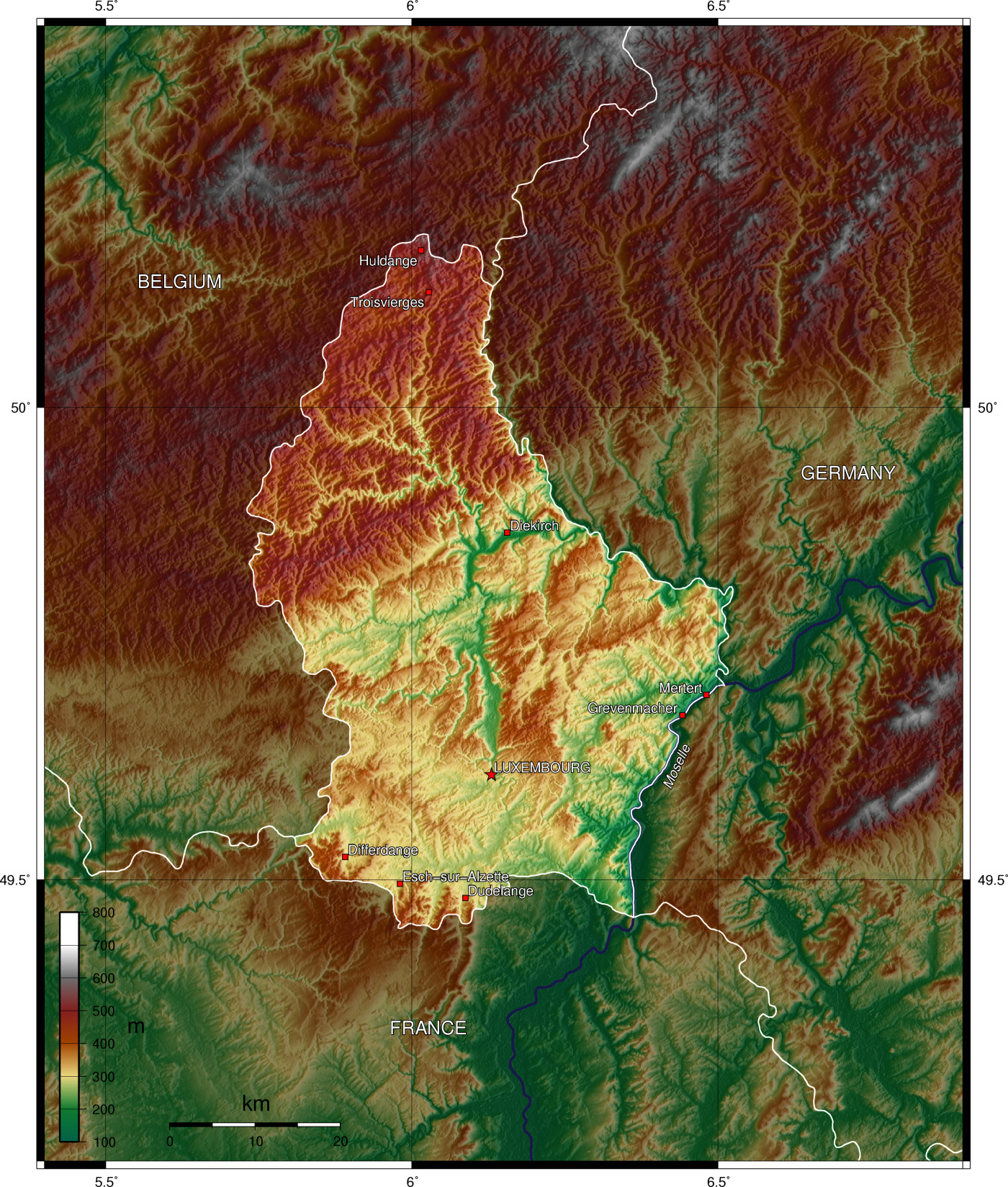
An enlargeable topographic map of Luxembourg

Geography of Luxembourg

- Luxembourg is: a landlocked country
- Location:
  - Northern Hemisphere and Eastern Hemisphere
  - Eurasia
    - Europe
      - Western Europe
  - Time zone: Central European Time (UTC+01), Central European Summer Time (UTC+02)
  - Extreme points of Luxembourg
    - High: Kneiff 560 m (1,837 ft)
    - Low: Moselle River 133 m (436 ft)
  - Land boundaries: 359 km

Belgium 148 km
Germany 138 km
France 73 km

- Coastline: none

- Population of Luxembourg: 672,050 (2024 estimate) - 163rd most populous country
- Area of Luxembourg: 2,586 km^{2}
- Atlas of Luxembourg

=== Environment of Luxembourg ===
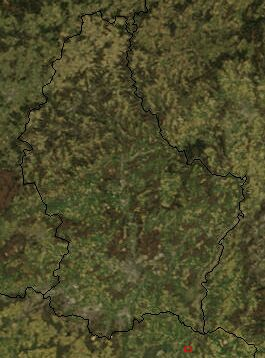
A satellite image of Luxembourg

Environment of Luxembourg

- Climate of Luxembourg
- Renewable energy in Luxembourg
- Geology of Luxembourg
- Global warming in Luxembourg
- Protected areas of Luxembourg
  - Biosphere reserves in Luxembourg
  - National parks of Luxembourg
- Wildlife of Luxembourg
  - Fauna of Luxembourg
    - Birds of Luxembourg
    - Mammals of Luxembourg

==== Natural geographic features of Luxembourg ====
- Rivers of Luxembourg
- Sandstone formation in Luxembourg
- World Heritage Sites in Luxembourg

=== Regions of Luxembourg ===
- Regions of Luxembourg: Guttland; Éislek

==== Ecoregions of Luxembourg ====
List of ecoregions in Luxembourg

- Ecoregions in Luxembourg

==== Administrative divisions of Luxembourg ====
Administrative divisions of Luxembourg

- Districts of Luxembourg (until 2015)
- Cantons of Luxembourg
  - Communes of Luxembourg

===== Districts of Luxembourg (until 2015) =====
Districts of Luxembourg

===== Cantons of Luxembourg =====
Cantons of Luxembourg

===== Communes of Luxembourg =====
Communes of Luxembourg

===== Municipalities of Luxembourg =====
- Capital of Luxembourg: Luxembourg City
- Cities of Luxembourg

===== Villages of Luxembourg =====
- List of villages in Luxembourg

=== Demography of Luxembourg ===
Demographics of Luxembourg

== Government and politics of Luxembourg ==
Politics of Luxembourg

- Form of government: Constitutional monarchy
- Capital of Luxembourg: Luxembourg City
- Elections in Luxembourg
- Political parties in Luxembourg

=== Branches of the government of Luxembourg ===
Government of Luxembourg

==== Executive branch of the government of Luxembourg ====
- Head of state: Grand Duke of Luxembourg,
- Head of government: Prime Minister of Luxembourg,
- Cabinet of Luxembourg

==== Legislative branch of the government of Luxembourg ====
- Chamber of Deputies of Luxembourg (unicameral)

==== Judicial branch of the government of Luxembourg ====
Court system of Luxembourg

- Supreme Court of Luxembourg

=== Foreign relations of Luxembourg ===
Foreign relations of Luxembourg

- Diplomatic missions in Luxembourg
- Diplomatic missions of Luxembourg

==== International organization membership ====
The Grand Duchy of Luxembourg is a member of:

- Asian Development Bank (ADB) (nonregional member)
- Australia Group
- Benelux Economic Union (Benelux)
- Council of Europe (CE)
- Economic and Monetary Union (EMU)
- Euro-Atlantic Partnership Council (EAPC)
- European Bank for Reconstruction and Development (EBRD)
- European Investment Bank (EIB)
- European Space Agency (ESA)
- European Union (EU)
- Food and Agriculture Organization (FAO)
- International Atomic Energy Agency (IAEA)
- International Bank for Reconstruction and Development (IBRD)
- International Chamber of Commerce (ICC)
- International Civil Aviation Organization (ICAO)
- International Criminal Court (ICCt)
- International Criminal Police Organization (Interpol)
- International Development Association (IDA)
- International Energy Agency (IEA)
- International Federation of Red Cross and Red Crescent Societies (IFRCS)
- International Finance Corporation (IFC)
- International Fund for Agricultural Development (IFAD)
- International Labour Organization (ILO)
- International Maritime Organization (IMO)
- International Monetary Fund (IMF)
- International Olympic Committee (IOC)
- International Organization for Migration (IOM)
- International Organization for Standardization (ISO)
- International Red Cross and Red Crescent Movement (ICRM)
- International Telecommunication Union (ITU)
- International Telecommunications Satellite Organization (ITSO)
- International Trade Union Confederation (ITUC)
- Inter-Parliamentary Union (IPU)
- Multilateral Investment Guarantee Agency (MIGA)
- North Atlantic Treaty Organization (NATO)
- Nuclear Energy Agency (NEA)
- Nuclear Suppliers Group (NSG)
- Organisation internationale de la Francophonie (OIF)
- Organisation for Economic Co-operation and Development (OECD)
- Organization for Security and Cooperation in Europe (OSCE)
- Organisation for the Prohibition of Chemical Weapons (OPCW)
- Organization of American States (OAS) (observer)
- Permanent Court of Arbitration (PCA)
- Schengen Convention
- United Nations (UN)
- United Nations Conference on Trade and Development (UNCTAD)
- United Nations Educational, Scientific, and Cultural Organization (UNESCO)
- United Nations High Commissioner for Refugees (UNHCR)
- United Nations Industrial Development Organization (UNIDO)
- United Nations Interim Force in Lebanon (UNIFIL)
- United Nations Relief and Works Agency for Palestine Refugees in the Near East (UNRWA)
- Universal Postal Union (UPU)
- Western European Union (WEU)
- World Confederation of Labour (WCL)
- World Customs Organization (WCO)
- World Federation of Trade Unions (WFTU)
- World Health Organization (WHO)
- World Intellectual Property Organization (WIPO)
- World Meteorological Organization (WMO)
- World Trade Organization (WTO)
- World Veterans Federation
- Zangger Committee (ZC)

=== Law and order in Luxembourg ===
Law of Luxembourg

- Constitution of Luxembourg
- Crime in Luxembourg
- Human rights in Luxembourg
  - LGBT rights in Luxembourg
  - Freedom of religion in Luxembourg
- Law enforcement in Luxembourg

=== Military of Luxembourg ===
Military of Luxembourg

- Command
  - Commander-in-chief: Grand Duke Henri
  - Minister for Defence: Yuriko Backes
    - Ministry of Defence of Luxembourg
  - Chief of Defence: Steve Thull
- Forces
  - Army of Luxembourg
  - Navy of Luxembourg: None
  - Air Force of Luxembourg
- Military history of Luxembourg
- Military ranks of Luxembourg

=== Local government in Luxembourg ===
Local government in Luxembourg

== History of Luxembourg ==
History of Luxembourg

- Timeline of the history of Luxembourg
- Current events of Luxembourg
- Celtic Luxembourg
- County of Luxembourg
- Duchy of Luxembourg
- Habsburg Netherlands
- Forêts
- German occupation of Luxembourg during World War I
- Luxembourg in World War II
- Military history of Luxembourg

== Culture of Luxembourg ==
Culture of Luxembourg

- Architecture of Luxembourg
  - Tallest structures in Luxembourg
- Cuisine of Luxembourg
- Festivals in Luxembourg
- Languages of Luxembourg
  - Multilingualism in Luxembourg
  - Luxembourgish
- Luxembourg American Cultural Society
- Media in Luxembourg
  - Newspapers in Luxembourg
  - Radio stations in Luxembourg
  - Television in Luxembourg
- Museums in Luxembourg
- National symbols of Luxembourg
  - Coat of arms of Luxembourg
  - Flag of Luxembourg
  - National anthem of Luxembourg
- People of Luxembourg
  - Social class in Luxembourg
- Prostitution in Luxembourg
- Public holidays in Luxembourg
- Records of Luxembourg
- Religion in Luxembourg
  - Christianity in Luxembourg
    - Roman Catholicism in Luxembourg
    - Protestantism in Luxembourg
  - Hinduism in Luxembourg
  - Islam in Luxembourg
  - Judaism in Luxembourg
  - Sikhism in Luxembourg
- World Heritage Sites in Luxembourg

=== Art in Luxembourg ===
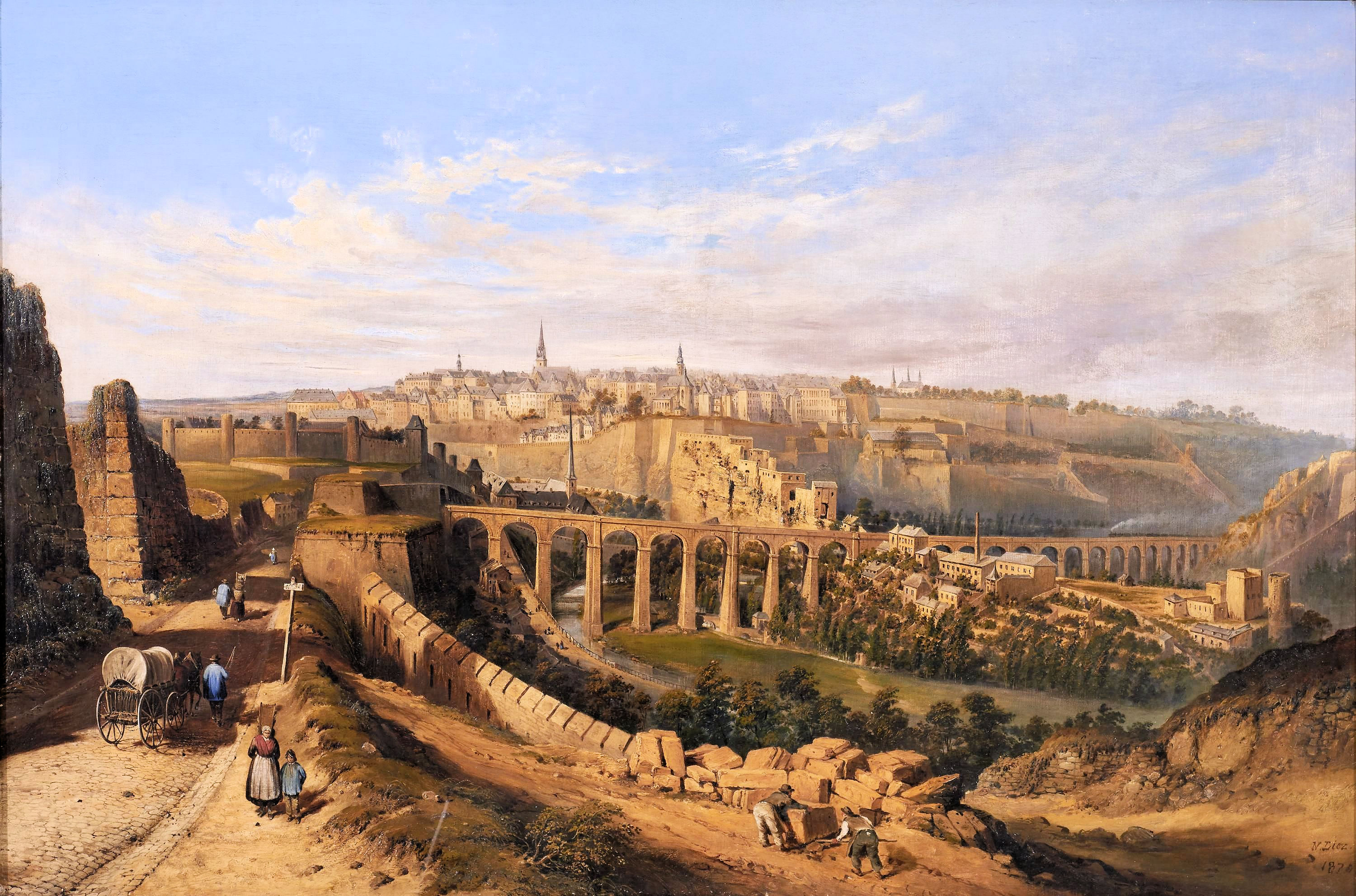
View of Luxembourg from the Fetschenhof, a painting by Nicolas Liez from 1870

Art of Luxembourg

- Notable artists
  - Painters from Luxembourg
- Architecture of Luxembourg
- Photography in Luxembourg
  - Photothèque (Luxembourg)
- Cinema of Luxembourg
- Literature of Luxembourg
  - Servais Prize
- Music of Luxembourg
- Theatre in Luxembourg
  - Théâtre des Capucins

=== Sports in Luxembourg ===
Sports in Luxembourg

- Football in Luxembourg
- Luxembourg at the Olympics
- Luxembourg national baseball team

== Economy and infrastructure of Luxembourg ==
Economy of Luxembourg

- Economic rank, by nominal GDP (2023): 71st (seventy-first)
- Accountancy in Luxembourg
- Agriculture in Luxembourg
- Banking in Luxembourg
  - National Bank of Luxembourg
  - Luxembourg for Finance
- Communications in Luxembourg
  - Internet in Luxembourg
- Companies of Luxembourg

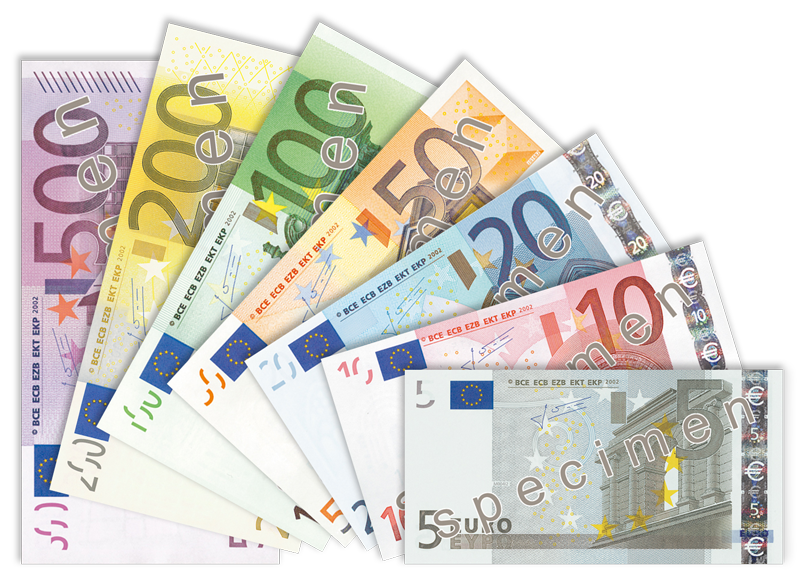
Euro banknotes

- Currency of Luxembourg: Euro (see also: Euro topics)
  - Previous currency: Luxembourgish franc
  - ISO 4217: EUR
- Electricity sector in Luxembourg
- Energy in Luxembourg
  - Energy policy of Luxembourg
  - Oil industry in Luxembourg
  - Nuclear energy in Luxembourg
- Health care in Luxembourg
- Mining in Luxembourg
- Social welfare in Luxembourg
- Steel industry in Luxembourg
- Luxembourg Stock Exchange
- Tourism in Luxembourg
  - Valley of the Seven Castles
  - Visa policy of Luxembourg
- Transport in Luxembourg
  - Airports in Luxembourg
  - Rail transport in Luxembourg
  - Roads in Luxembourg
  - Trams in Luxembourg

== Education in Luxembourg ==
Education in Luxembourg

=== Lists ===
- List of airports in Luxembourg
- List of archbishops of Luxembourg
- List of artists from Luxembourg
- List of banks in Luxembourg
- List of castles in Luxembourg
- List of communes of Luxembourg
- List of companies of Luxembourg
- List of consorts of Luxembourg
- List of diplomatic missions of Luxembourg
- list of film actors of Luxembourg
- List of flags of Luxembourg
- List of governors of Luxembourg
- List of heirs to the throne of Luxembourg
- List of Lepidoptera of Luxembourg
- List of mayors of Luxembourg City
- List of ministers for finances of Luxembourg
- List of motorways in Luxembourg
- List of museums in Luxembourg
- List of newspapers in Luxembourg
- List of political parties in Luxembourg
- List of railway stations in Luxembourg
- List of rivers of Luxembourg
- List of towns in Luxembourg
- List of villages in Luxembourg
- List of wars involving Luxembourg
- List of World Heritage Sites in Luxembourg

== See also ==
Luxembourg

- List of international rankings
- Member state of the European Union
- Member state of the North Atlantic Treaty Organization
- Member state of the United Nations
- Outline of Europe
- Outline of geography
