= International rankings of Luxembourg =

These are the international rankings of the Luxembourg:

== Economy ==
- International Monetary Fund: Income per capita in purchasing power parity ranked 1 out of 182 (2009)
- United Nations Development Programme: Human Development Index ranked 24 out of 169 (2010)
- Gallup World Poll: happiness ranked 28 out of 155 (2009)
- World Economic Forum: Global Competitiveness Report ranked 20 out of 133 (2010-2011)

== Military ==
- Institute for Economics and Peace: Global Peace Index ranked 7 out of 149 (2010)

== Politics ==
- Transparency International: Corruption Perceptions Index ranked 11 out of 178 (2010)
- Reporters Without Borders: Press Freedom Index ranked 14 out of 178 (2010)
- The Economist: Democracy Index ranked 9 out of 167 (2008)

== Technology ==
- World Intellectual Property Organization: Global Innovation Index 2026, ranked 23 out of 139 countries

== See also ==
- Communications in Luxembourg
- Education in Luxembourg
- Geography of Luxembourg
- Geology of Luxembourg
- Demographics of Luxembourg
- Government of Luxembourg
- Foreign relations of Luxembourg
- Law of Luxembourg
- Military of Luxembourg
- Prostitution in Luxembourg
