= Climate change in Luxembourg =

Emissions, impacts and responses of Luxembourg related to climate change

Climate change in Luxembourg discusses the climate change issues in Luxembourg. Luxembourg is a territory of 998.4 miles (2 586 km2). Of the total area of Luxembourg, 85.5% was agricultural land and land under forest – with around 51% for agriculture and 35% for forests. Changes in temperature and rainfall will have an impact on Luxembourg especially due to their high percentage of forestry.

== Greenhouse gas emissions ==
Emissions of carbon dioxide in total, per capita in 2007 were 22.4 tons CO_{2} compared to the European Union's 27 countries average of 7.9 tons per capita. 1990 emissions were 13 Mt CO_{2eq}

The Kyoto Protocol target is reduction of 4 Mt (28%).

=== Energy use ===
The European primary energy use per capita was highest in 2008 in (TWh/per million): 1) Iceland 191 2) Luxembourg 98 3) Finland 77 4) Norway 72 5) Belgium 64 6) Sweden 62 7) Netherlands 56 8) Russia 56 9) Kazakhstan 53 10) Czech Republic 50 11) France 48, 12) Germany 47 13) Estonia 47 and 14) Austria 46.

== Mitigation and adaptation ==
=== Policies and legislation ===
Luxembourg is a member of the EU and thus the EU directives are binding.

==== Paris Agreement ====
The Paris Agreement is a legally international agreement, its main goal is to limit global warming to below 1.5 degrees Celsius, compared to pre-industrial levels. The Nationally Determined Contributions (NDC's) are the plans to fight climate change adapted for each country. Every party in the agreement has different targets based on its own historical climate records and country's circumstances and all the targets for each country are stated in their NDC. In the case of member countries of the European Union the goals are very similar and the European Union work with a common strategy within the Paris agreement.

== Rising temperatures ==
From 1981-2010, Luxembourg's average annual temperature rose by 1 °C, in comparison to 1961-1990. This rise in temperature is expected to increase further, possibly by 3.1 °C by the end of the 21st century. Luxembourg is on par with the world average temperature increase of 0.03 °C per year. There is a trend of a lower number of frost days and a higher number of extremely warm days.

=== Recent temperature extremes ===
Date	Temperature	Location	Notes
19 July 2022	36.3 °C	Luxembourg City	
25 July 2019	40.8 °C	Steinsel commune	Broke the 2003 temperature record
8 & 12 August 2003	37.9 °C	Findel airport	

== See also ==
- Plug-in electric vehicles in Luxembourg
