= Working class =

Social class of people working for a living

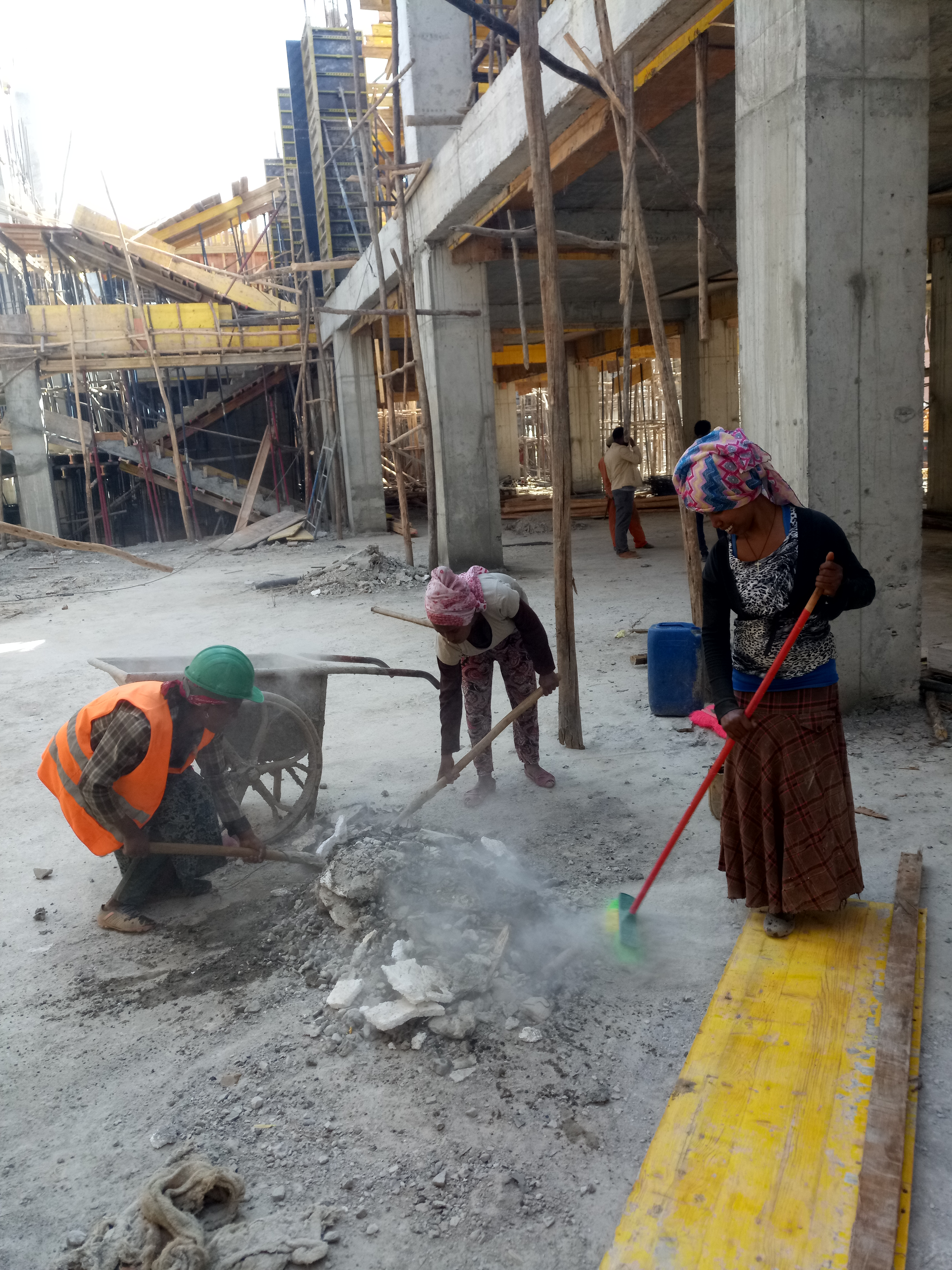
Construction workers, commonly regarded as working class, at work at St. Paul's Hospital Cardiac center in Ethiopia, 2017

The working class is a group of people in a social hierarchy, typically defined by earning wages or salaries through their ability to work. Members of the working class rely primarily upon earnings from wage labour. Most common definitions of "working class" in use in the United States limit its membership to workers who hold blue-collar and pink-collar jobs, or whose income is insufficiently high to place them in the middle class, or both. However, socialists define "working class" to include all workers who fall into the category of requiring income from wage labour to subsist; thus, this definition can include almost all of the working population of industrialized economies.

== Definitions ==
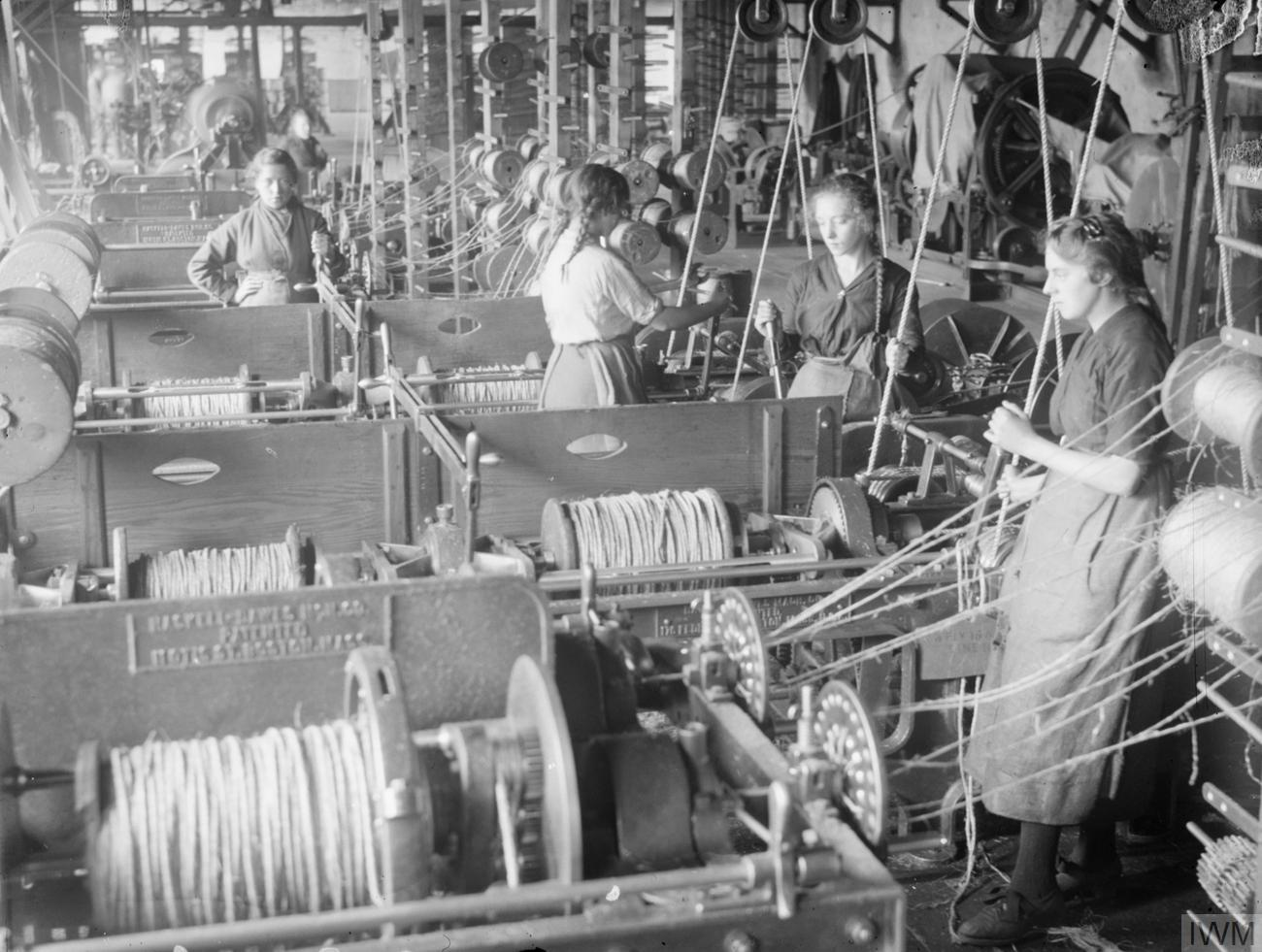
Factory workers manufacturing rope during World War I

As with many terms describing social class, working class is defined and used in different ways. One definition used by many socialists is that the working class includes all those who have nothing to sell but their labour, a group otherwise referred to as the proletariat. In this sense, the working class includes white and blue-collar workers, manual and menial workers of all types, excluding individuals who derive their livelihood from business ownership or the labour of others. The term, which is primarily used to evoke images of laborers suffering "class disadvantage in spite of their individual effort", can also have racial connotations, applying diverse themes of poverty and implications about whether one is deserving of aid.

In other contexts the term working class refers to a section of society dependent on physical labour, especially when compensated with an hourly wage (for certain types of science, as well as journalistic or political analysis). Working-class occupations can be categorized into four groups: unskilled labourers, artisans, outworkers, and factory workers.

Common alternative definitions of working class include definition by income level, whereby the working class is contrasted with a middle class on the basis of access to economic resources, education, cultural interests, and other goods and services, and in the West the "white working class" has been "loosely defined" by the New York Times as comprising white people without college degrees.

Researchers in Australia have suggested that working-class status should be defined subjectively as a self-identification with the working-class group. This subjective approach allows individuals, rather than researchers, to define their own "subjective" and "perceived" social class.

The working class can be approximated by the median voter with median income. Political issue preferences vary by income.

=== Marxist definition: the proletariat ===
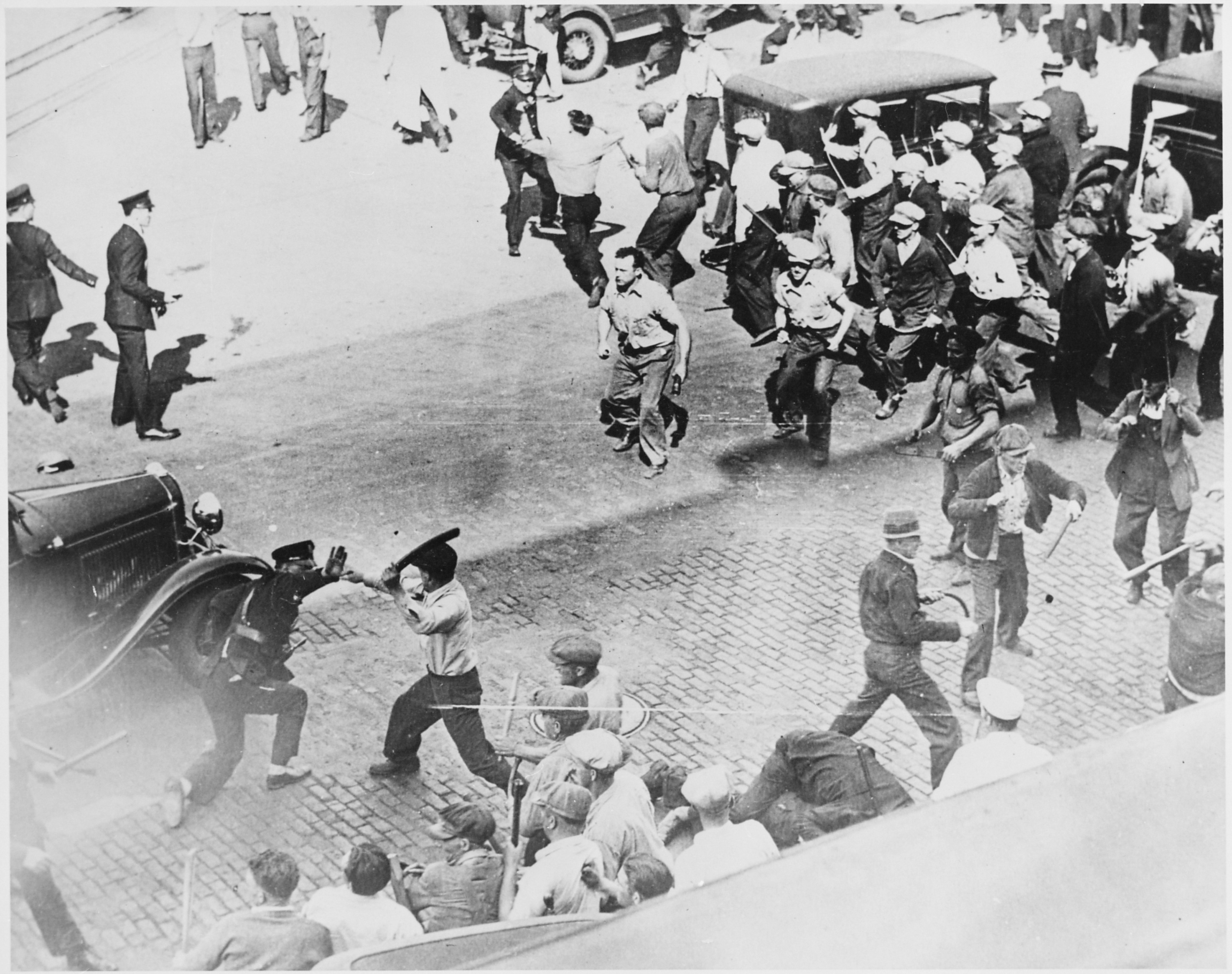
Striking teamsters battling police on the streets of Minneapolis, Minnesota, June 1934

Karl Marx defined the working class or proletariat as those individuals who sell their labour power for wages and who do not own the means of production. He argued that they were responsible for creating the wealth of a society, asserting that the working class physically build bridges, craft furniture, grow food, and nurse children, but do not own land or factories.

A sub-section of the proletariat, the lumpenproletariat (rag-proletariat), are the extremely poor and unemployed, such as day labourers and homeless people. Marx considered them to be devoid of class consciousness.

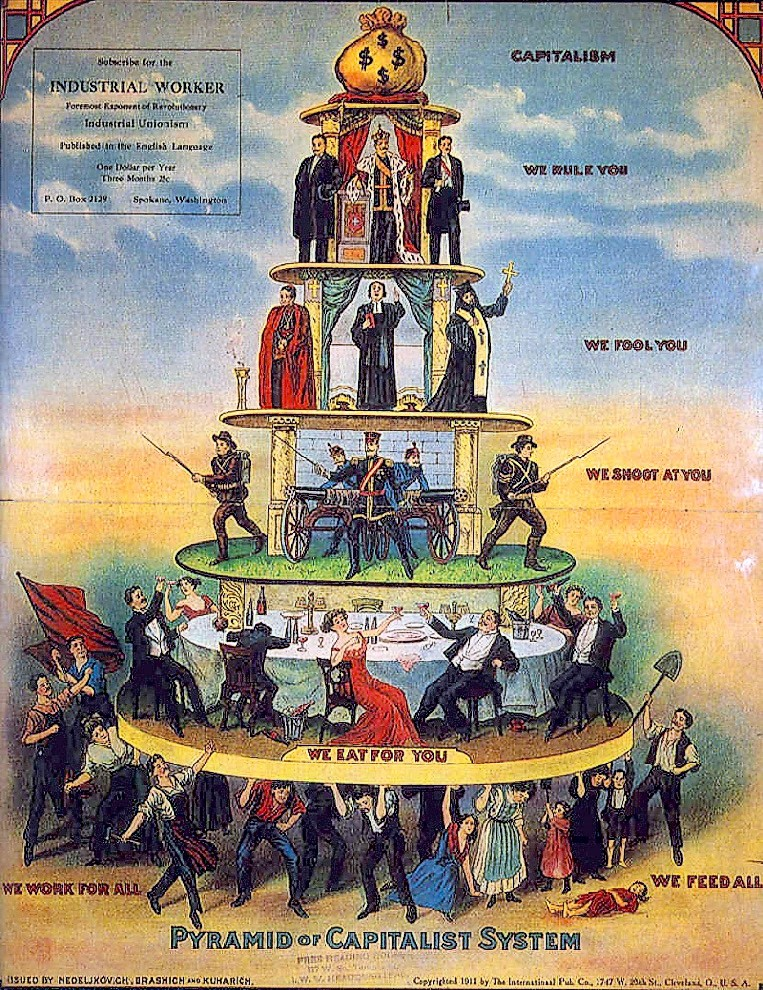
Socialist conception of class society in 1900–1901. The drawing was based on a leaflet of the "Union of Russian Socialists".

In Marxist terms wage labourers and those dependent on the welfare state are working class, and those who live on accumulated capital are not, and this broad dichotomy defines the class struggle. In The Communist Manifesto, Marx and Friedrich Engels argue that it is the destiny of the working class to displace the capitalist system, with the dictatorship of the proletariat (as opposed to the "dictatorship of the bourgeoisie") abolishing the social relationships underpinning the class system before then developing into a communist society in which "the free development of each is the condition for the free development of all."

== History and growth ==
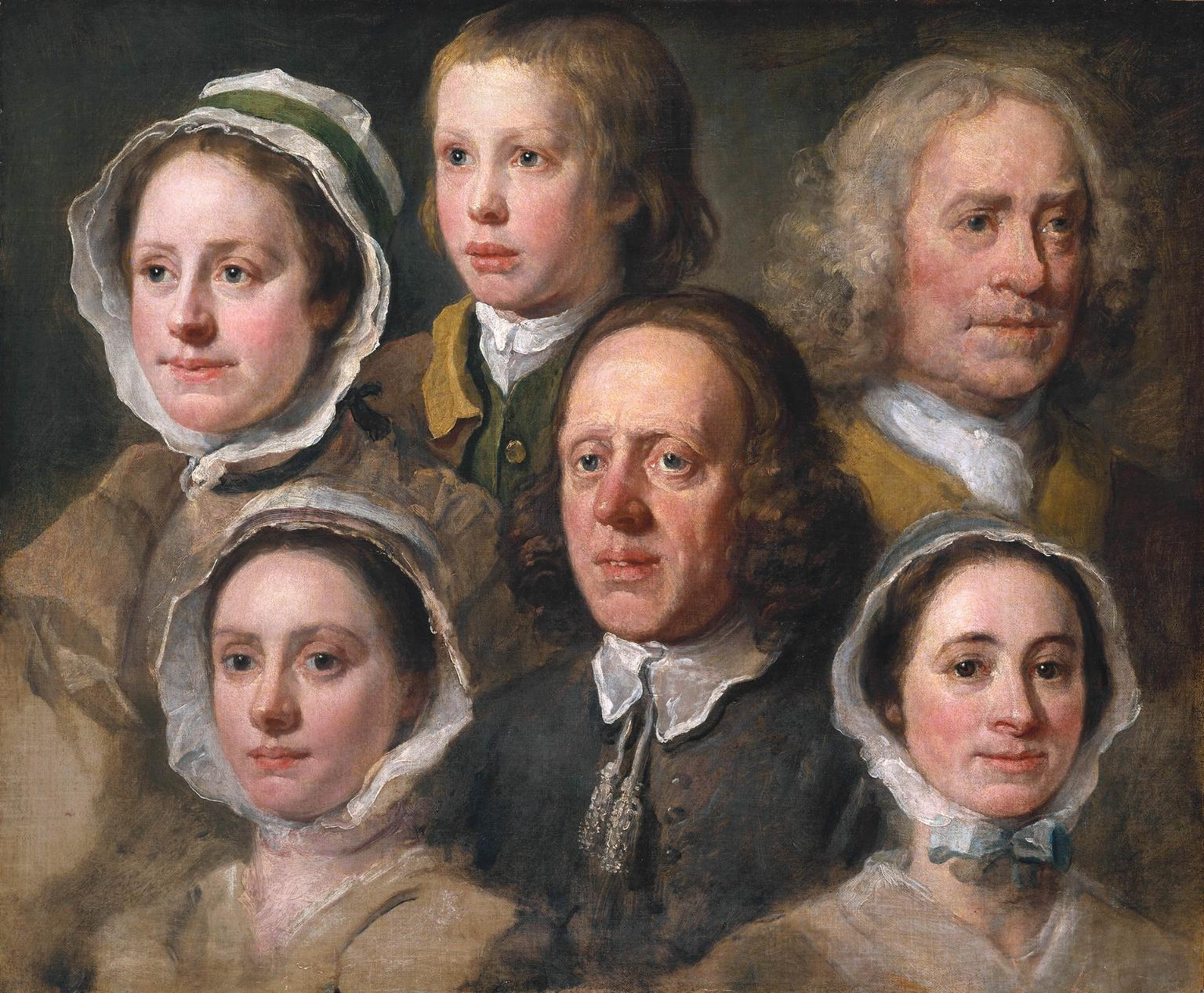
Hogarth's Servants, painting by William Hogarth of six of his servants

In feudal Europe, the working class as such did not exist in large numbers. Instead, most people were part of the labouring class, a group made up of different professions, trades and occupations. A lawyer, craftsman and peasant were all considered to be part of the same social unit, a third estate of people who were neither aristocrats nor church officials. Similar hierarchies existed outside Europe in other pre-industrial societies. The social position of these labouring classes was viewed as ordained by natural law and common religious belief. This social position was contested, particularly by peasants, for example during the German Peasants' War.

In the late 18th century, under the influence of the Enlightenment, European society was in a state of change, and this change could not be reconciled with the idea of a changeless God-created social order. Wealthy members of these societies created ideologies which blamed many of the problems of working-class people on their morals and ethics (i.e. excessive consumption of alcohol, perceived laziness and inability to save money). In The Making of the English Working Class, E. P. Thompson argues that the English working class was present at its own creation, and seeks to describe the transformation of pre-modern labouring classes into a modern, politically self-conscious, working class.

Starting around 1917, a number of countries became ruled in the interests of the working class (see Soviet working class). Some historians have noted that a key change in these Soviet-style societies has been a new type of proletarianization, often effected by the administratively-achieved forced displacement of peasants and rural workers. Since then, four major industrial states have turned towards semi-market-based governance (China, Laos, Vietnam, Cuba), and one state has turned inwards into an increasing cycle of poverty and brutalization (North Korea). Other states of this sort have collapsed (such as the Soviet Union).

Since 1960, large-scale proletarianization and enclosure of commons has occurred in the third world, generating new working classes. Additionally, countries such as India have been slowly undergoing social change, expanding the size of the urban working class.

== Informal working class ==
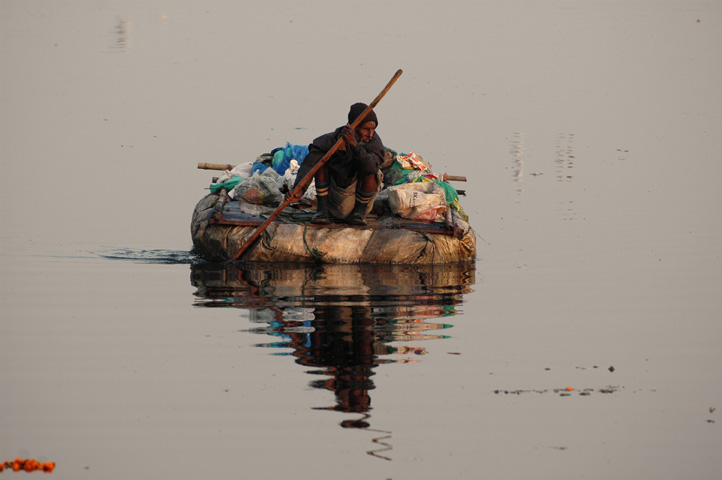
Ragpicker in Delhi, India

The informal working class is a sociological term coined by Mike Davis for a class of over a billion predominantly young urban people who are in no way formally connected to the global economy and who try to survive primarily in slums. According to Davis, this class no longer corresponds to the socio-theoretical concepts of a class, from Marx, Max Weber or the theory of modernization. Thereafter, this class developed worldwide from the 1960s, especially in the southern hemisphere. In contrast to previous notions of a class of the lumpen proletariat or the notions of a "slum of hope" from the 1920s and 1930s, members of this class are given hardly any chances of attaining membership of the formal economic structures.

== Higher education ==
Diane Reay stresses the challenges that working-class students can face during the transition to and within higher education, and research intensive universities in particular. One factor can be the university community being perceived as a predominately middle-class social space, creating a sense of otherness due to class differences in social norms and knowledge of navigating academia.

== See also ==
- Apprentice
- Blue collar
- Bourgeoisie/Professional managerial class
- Critique of work
- Embourgeoisement thesis
- False consciousness
- Globalization
- Industrial novel
- Labour movement
- Labourer
- List of blue-collar jobs
- Lists of occupations
- Living wage
- Marxian class theory
- Minimum wage
- Proletarian literature
- Proletarian novel
- Reserve army of labour
- Seebohm Rowntree, English sociological researcher
- Social mobility
- Trade union
- Vocational education
- Wage slavery
- Working-class culture
- Working-class education

Working classes in different countries

- Working class in Italy
- Working class in Luxembourg
- Working class in the UK
- Working class in the United States
