= Luxembourg Plateau =

Coordinates: 49.6°N 6.12°E

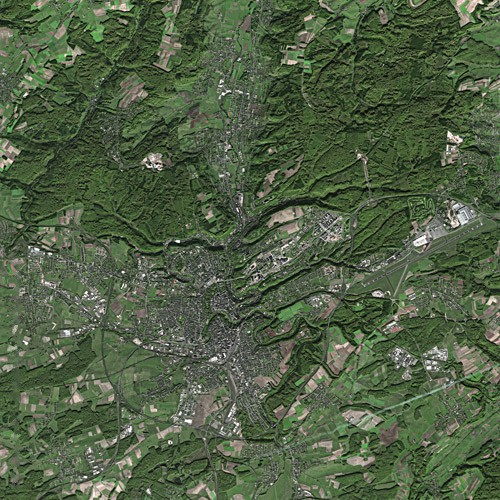
Satellite image of the plateau

The Luxembourg plateau is a large Early Jurassic sandstone plateau in south-central Luxembourg. Lying mostly between 300 metres (980 ft) and 400 metres (1,300 ft), it is the dominant part of the Gutland region.

The mid-Alzette runs through the Luxembourg plateau, whilst the Black Ernz, White Ernz, Mamer, and Syre also have their sources on the Luxembourg plateau. The highest point is in the Grünewald, at 437 metres (1,434 ft). In terms of land use, the plateau is a patchwork of forests and farmland. Some of Luxembourg's most fertile soil is on the plateau, but other economic priorities and environmental pressure contribute to agriculture forming only a very small part of economic activity on the plateau.

The plateau is the most populous sub-region of Luxembourg, being inhabited by over 170,000 people. Economically and socially, Luxembourg City dominates the plateau, with almost half of the population of the large sub-region. Other towns on the plateau include Bascharage, Bertrange, Howald, Mamer, and Strassen, all of which have populations in excess of 4,000 people. The economy of the region is focused on administration, financial services, tourism, and high tech industry.
