= Environment of Luxembourg =

The environment of Luxembourg has been affected by the country' rapid population growth (9% between 2000 and 2007, 34% in economy), its heavy road traffic (75% of fuel for vehicles from outside Luxembourg) and its lack of renewable energy resources.

== Air ==
While emissions of nitrogen and sulfur oxides (NOx and SOx) as well as non-methane volatile organic compounds (NMVOCs) have been reduced since 2000, limit values for the protection of human health from nitrogen dioxide (NO_{2}) are being exceeded in Luxembourg City, primarily because of road traffic. Concentrations of ground-level ozone are regularly above the pre-alert threshold for the protection of human health at several sites. Sulfur dioxide emissions are however well below the authorised limit. Dioxins and furans (PCDD/F) near steel plants sometimes exceed health standards. In data compiled for 140 countries by the International Energy Agency in October 2010, the 2007 carbon dioxide emissions for Luxembourg at 22.8 metric tons per capita are the highest in Europe and substantially higher than those in the United States.

Action is being taken at the national level to reduce CO_{2} emissions, to promote better practice in the use of energy and to control leaks of fluorides and GHGs from refrigeration systems.

== Water ==
The Water Management Administration programme of the Ministry of the Interior and Greater Region was created in 2004 for integrated water management. The national nitrogen balance has improved significantly. Despite legal requirements from the mid-1990s, drinking water sources have not been protected with the result that sources have been contaminated by nitrates and pesticides. At least 40% of surface water is likely to fall short of 2015 EU targets for chemical and biological quality. Only 22% of the population is connected to a tertiary-level waste water treatment plant, even though the entire country is classified as a sensitive zone.

== Waste management ==
Luxembourg has an effective waste management plan in accordance with EU legislation. Industrial waste is also effectively managed. Municipal waste production per capita, however, is among the highest in the OECD and the target of 30% reduction in specific disposable waste and bulky waste has been missed. In 2012 municipal solid waste generation per capita was 662 kg. The polluter pays principle is only partially applied. There has been little progress in managing waste from the health sector.

== Energy consumption ==
Luxembourg is almost completely dependent (99% in 2005) on energy imports of oil and of natural gas, the latter increasingly contributing to electricity generation since 2002. Energy consumption and CO_{2} emissions per capita are the highest in the EU-27. Use of fuel for road transport is around double the EU-27 average. While electricity production from small-scale hydro power has stabilized in recent years, contributions from onshore wind, solar PV, and biogas have now started to increase.

== Sustainable development ==
Despite its growing GDP and population, Luxembourg has made progress in decoupling environmental pressures from economic growth and has developed a National Plan for Sustainable Development. The annual vehicle tax is now calculated as a function of CO_{2} emissions. A National Plan for Energy Efficiency has been introduced, together with economic incentives targeted at the construction industry. A national body has been created to provide information and advice on energy savings and renewable energy. However, there are still problems in connection with CO_{2} emissions, especially as Luxembourg's economy is the most carbon-intensive in the OECD in per capita terms even though this is partly due to the sales of fuel to non-residents.

== Current status ==
The 2010 OECD review of Luxembourg's environmental performance highlighted areas requiring special attention. In 2007, GHG emissions were at their 1990 level. Luxembourg's action plan will not be able to achieve the ambitious target (-28% below 1990 levels) set under the Kyoto Protocol and the EU burden-sharing agreement. CO_{2} emissions per capita are the highest in the OECD, with a significant portion from international road transport. GHG emissions from the steel industry have sharply declined with replacement of blast furnaces by electric arc furnaces while transport emissions have risen with the growing number of crossborder travellers and higher sales of diesel and gasoline as a result of Luxembourg's comparatively low prices. The country is unlikely to meet its NOx emission reduction goals (52% below 1990 by 2010) set under the Gothenburg Protocol to the Convention on Longrange Transboundary Air Pollution. Compliance with international commitments is lagging, particularly with respect to the EU environmental directives. Luxembourg has been cited on several occasions for infractions of European environmental legislation (urban waste water, nitrates, integrated prevention and reduction of pollution).
