= List of airports in Luxembourg =

Location of airports in Luxembourg

This is a list of airports in Luxembourg, sorted by location.

== List ==
Location	ICAO	IATA	Airport name	Coordinates	References
Current airports
Esch-sur-Alzette	ELEA		Centre Hospitalier Emile Mayrisch Heliport	49°30′03″N 005°58′06″E	
Ettelbruck	ELET		Saint-Louis Hospital Heliport	49°51′16″N 006°05′40″E	
Luxembourg City	ELLC		Centre Hospitalier de Luxembourg Heliport	49°37′09″N 006°06′09″E	
Luxembourg City	ELLK		Kirchberg Hospital Heliport	49°37′58″N 006°10′38″E	
Luxembourg City	ELLX	LUX	Luxembourg Airport	49°37′24″N 006°12′16″E	
Luxembourg City	ELLZ		Clinique Sainte-Thérèse Heliport	49°36′12″N 006°07′41″E	
Noertrange/Wiltz	ELNT		Noertrange Airfield (Wiltz-Noertrange Airfield)	49°58′52″N 005°55′04″E	
Useldange	ELUS		Useldange Airfield	49°46′04″N 005°58′03″E	
Abandoned airports
Medernach	ELMD		Kitzebur/Medernach Aerodrome (Kitzebour Ultralight Airfield)	49°47′21″N 006°14′30″E	

== See also ==
- Transport in Luxembourg
- List of airports by ICAO code: EH-EY#EL – Luxembourg
- Wikipedia: Airline destination lists: Europe#Luxembourg
