= Geography of Luxembourg =

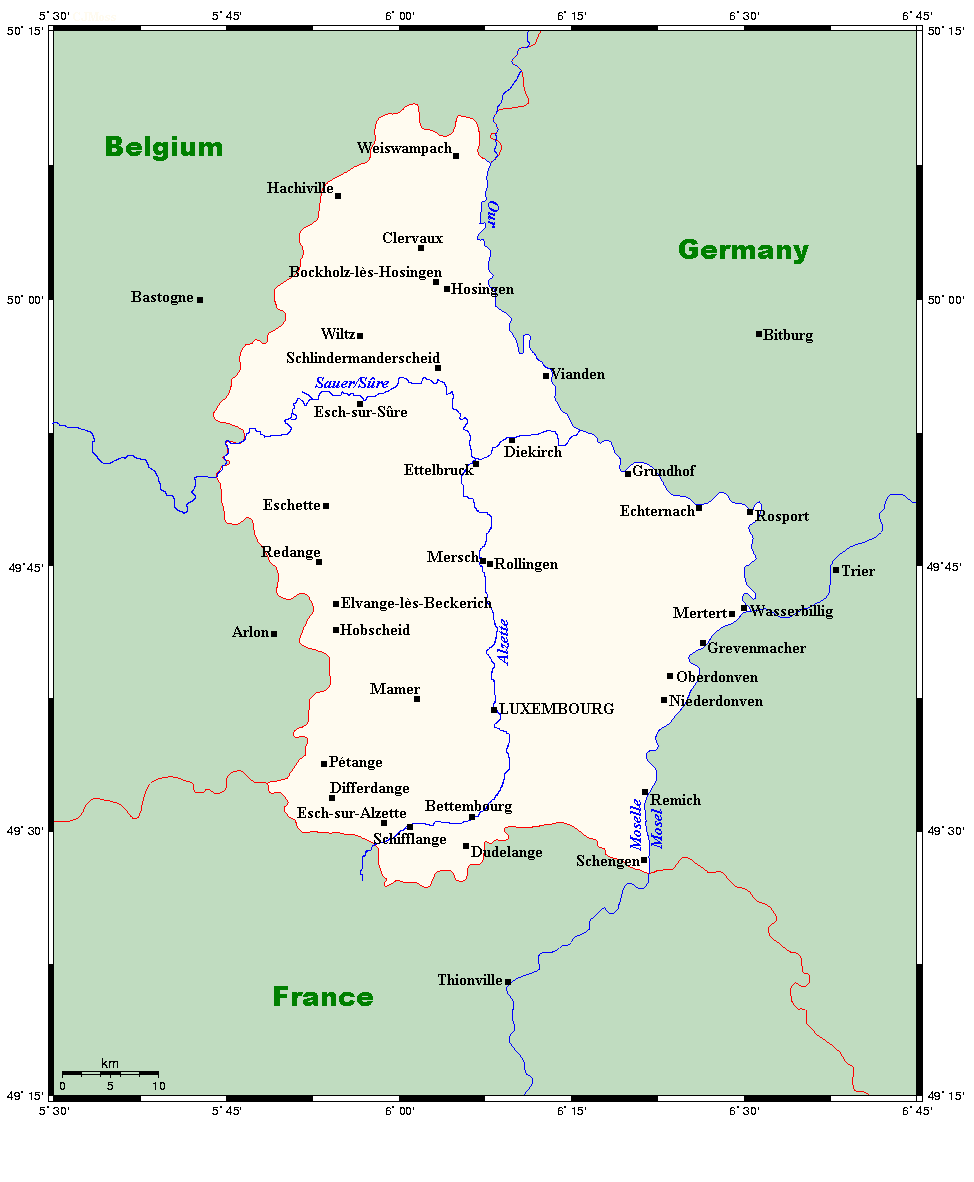
Towns and rivers in Luxembourg

Luxembourg is a small country located in the Low Countries, part of North-West Europe. It borders Belgium for 148 kilometres (92 miles) to the west and north, France (73 km [45 mi]) to the south, and Germany (138 km [86 mi]) to the east. Luxembourg is landlocked, separated from the North Sea by Belgium.

The topography of the country is divided very clearly between the hilly Éislek of the northern third of the Grand Duchy and the flat Gutland, which occupies the southern two-thirds. The country's longest river is the Sauer, which is a tributary of the Moselle, the basin of which includes almost all of Luxembourg's area. Other major rivers include the Alzette in the south and the Wiltz in the north.

The capital, and by far the largest city, is Luxembourg City, which is located in the Gutland, as are most of the country's main population centres, including Esch-sur-Alzette, Dudelange, and Differdange. Besides Luxembourg City, the other main towns are primarily located in the southern Red Lands region, which lines the border between Luxembourg and France to the south.

== Physical geography ==
=== Topography ===
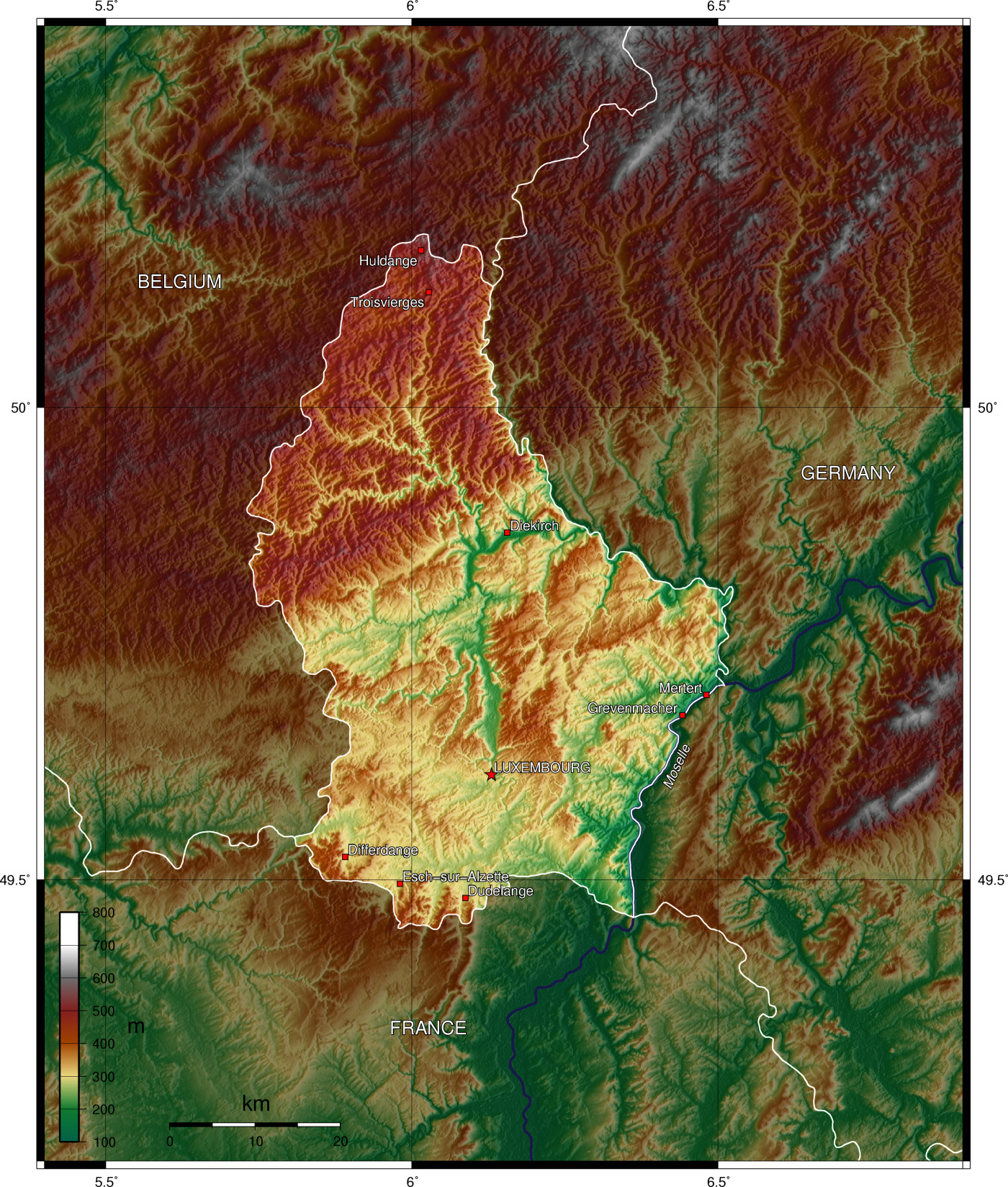
A map of Luxembourg's relief clearly illustrates the dichotomy between the hilly Éislek in the north and the southern Gutland.

Despite its small size, Luxembourg has a varied topography, with two main features to its landscape. The northern section of the country is formed by part of the plateau of the Ardennes, where the mountain heights range from 450 to 560 metres (1,500 to 1,800 feet). The rest of the country is made up of undulating countryside with broad valleys. The capital, Luxembourg City, is located in the southern part of the country.

=== Green heart of Europe ===
Because the soil is so difficult to cultivate, most of the land is used for cattle pasture. The Ardennes region also includes the Upper Sûre National Park, an important conservation area and a hiker's retreat.

South of the Sûre River, the country is known as the Gutland. The region covers slightly over two-thirds of the country.

The terrain gently rises and falls with an average height of 200 m (700 ft). Agriculture is the main activity as term Gutland arises from the fertile soil and warm, dry summers experienced is this part of the Duchy compared to the Éislek region.

As a result, vegetables and fruit, such as strawberries, apples, plums, and cherries, are grown in large quantities. River erosion in this area has created deep gorges and caves, resulting in some spectacular scenery.

In the extreme south of the country lies "the land of the red rocks" – a reference to the deposits of minerals found here. Rich in iron ore, the district has been a mining and heavy industrial region since Roman if not earlier times and stretches for over 19 km (12 mi). The tall chimneys of the iron and steel works are typical landmarks of the industrial south. To the east lies the grape-growing valley of the Moselle. Numerous villages nestle in the deep valleys and behind the vineyards along the river banks. Most villages have at least one winery. Also in the east is the "Little Switzerland" area, characterized by wooded glens and ravines in unusual rock formations.

=== Rivers and lakes ===
Luxembourg has a number of minor rivers, such as the Eisch, the Alzette, and the Pétrusse, but the main river is the Moselle with its tributaries-the Sûre and the Our. Together, their courses serve as a natural boundary between Luxembourg and Germany. Along their banks, many of the country's medieval castles can be found.

The Moselle actually rises in northeast France and flows north through Luxembourg for 31 km (19 mi) to join the mighty Rhine at Koblenz, Germany. The Moselle is 544 km (544 km) long, and is navigable, due to canalization for 64 km (40 mi). Green slopes, covered with vines, flank the meandering course of the river.

Rising in Belgium, the Sûre River flows for 172 km (107 mi) in an easterly direction through Luxembourg and into the Moselle. Its sinuous course essentially cuts Luxembourg from east to west. The Our River, flowing along the northeastern border, is a tributary of the Sûre. Its valley is surrounded by unspoiled countryside.

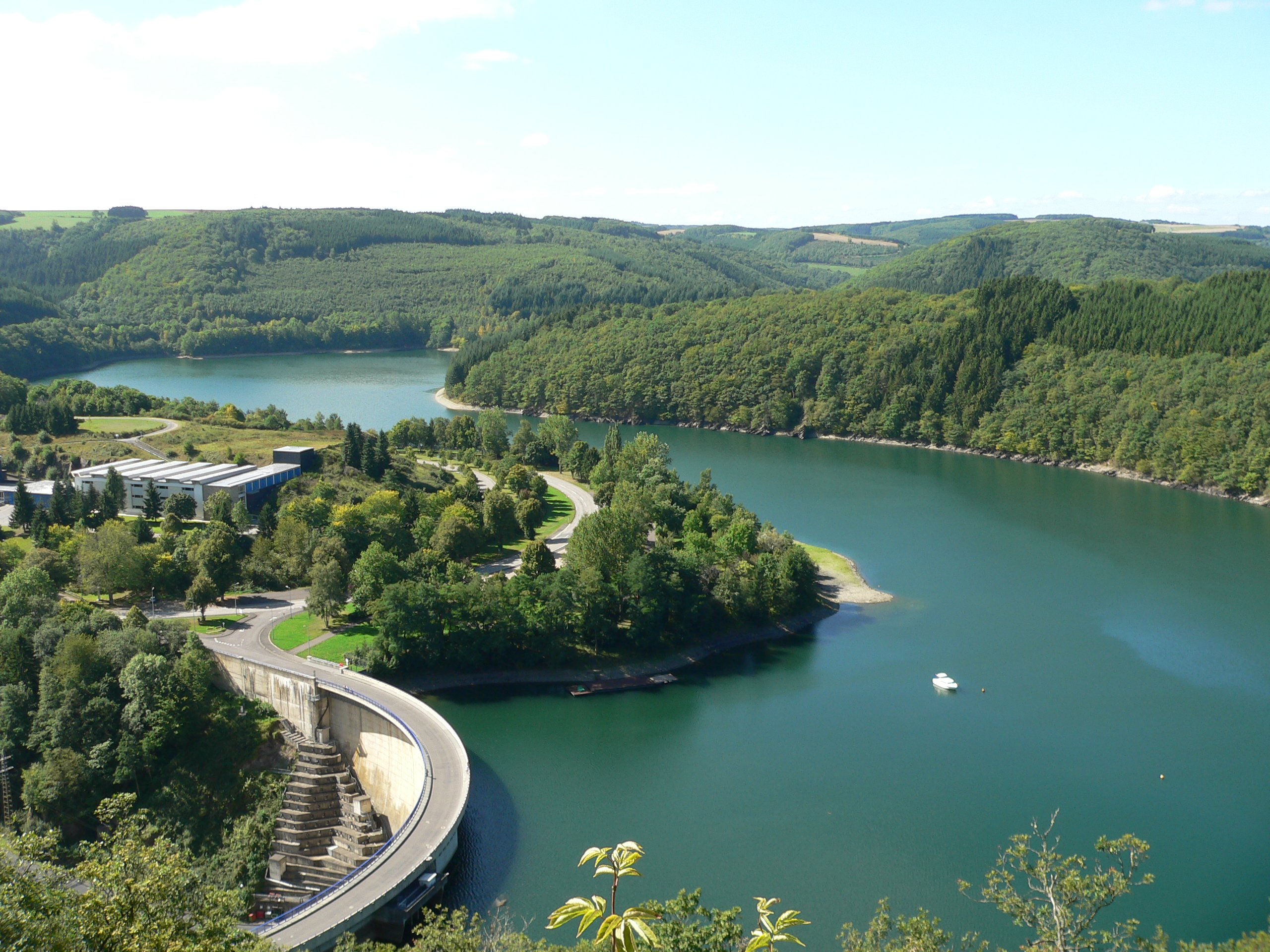
Dam in the Upper Sûre lake

The Upper Sûre lake is the largest stretch of water in the Grand Duchy. Surrounded by luxuriant vegetation and peaceful creeks, the lake is a centre for water sports, such as sailing, canoeing, and kayaking. Such outdoor activities, which has made it an attractive spot for tourists, have led to the growth of a local crafts industry.

The town of Esch-sur-Sûre nestles at one end of the lake. Immediately above it, the river has been dammed to form a hydroelectric reservoir extending some 10 km (6 mi) up the valley. The Upper Sûre dam was built in the 1960s to meet the country's drinking water requirements

=== Extreme points ===
Elevation extremes:
lowest point: Moselle at Wasserbillig - 133 m
highest point: Kneiff near Wilwerdange - 560 m

== Environment ==
=== Climate ===
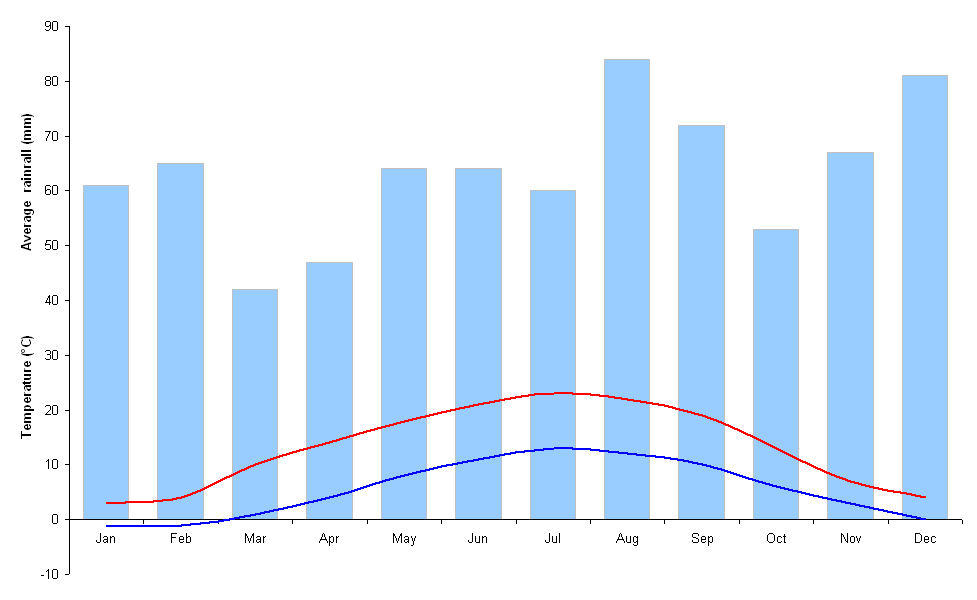

Luxembourg is part of the West European Continental climatic region, and enjoys a temperate climate without extremes. Winters are mild, summers fairly cool, and rainfall is high.

Seasonal weather is somewhat different between the northern and southern regions. In the north there is considerable influence from the Atlantic systems, in which the passage of frequent pressure depressions gives rise to unstable weather conditions. This results in overcast skies and considerable drizzle in the winter.

Rainfall reaches 1,200 mm (47.2 in) a year in some areas. In the summer, excessive heat is rare and temperatures drop noticeably at night. Low temperatures and humidity make for what those living in this part of the country call, optimistically, an "invigorating climate".

In the south, although the rainfall is not significantly low, at around 800 mm (31.5 in), and the winters no milder, the principal difference is in the higher summer temperatures, especially in the Moselle Valley. Crops, especially wine grapes, thrive here. With a mean annual temperature of 10 °C (50 °F), the sunniest months are May to August. In the spring, the countryside is a riot of wildflowers and blossoms.

=== Flora ===
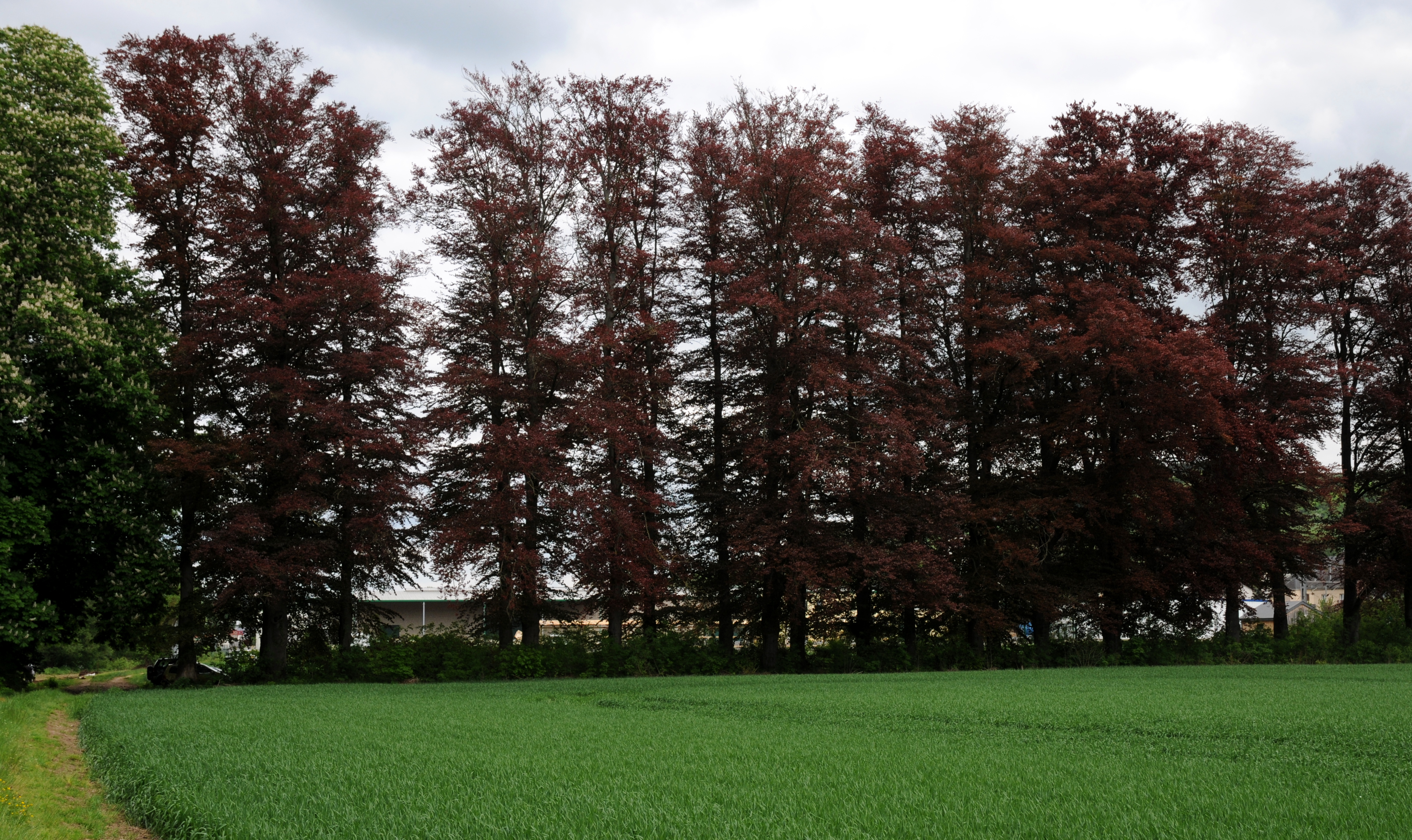
Trees at Birtrange Castle in Luxembourg

Luxembourg's flora is characterized by the country's location at the border between the Atlantic-European and Central-European climate zones. In the north, beech and oak trees are plentiful. The oak trees can grow up to 30–45 m (98–148 ft), with a diameter of 1.2–2.4 m (3.9–7.9 ft). They supply large quantities of excellent hardwood timber because of their strength.

Along the riverbanks, species like the black alder and willows can be found. Alder wood is pale yellow to reddish brown, fine-textured and durable even under water. It is also an important timber tree mainly because of its disease-resistant properties. Willow trees can reach a height of 20 m (66 ft), and are valued for ornamental purposes.

The narrow, deeply incised valleys of the north also provide a habitat for rare plants and animals, especially the European otter, a protected species. In the industrial south, among the abandoned quarries and deserted open pit mines, nature has reclaimed her own, and there are flowers everywhere.

=== International agreements ===
Party to: Air Pollution, Air Pollution-Nitrogen Oxides, Air Pollution-Sulphur 85, Air Pollution-Sulphur 94, Air Pollution-Volatile Organic Compounds, Biodiversity, Climate Change, Desertification, Endangered Species, Hazardous Wastes, Marine Dumping, Nuclear Test Ban, Ozone Layer Protection, Ship Pollution, Tropical Timber 83, Tropical Timber 94, Wetlands

Signed, but not ratified: Air Pollution-Persistent Organic Pollutants, Climate Change-Kyoto Protocol, Environmental Modification, Law of the Sea

== Geographical statistics ==
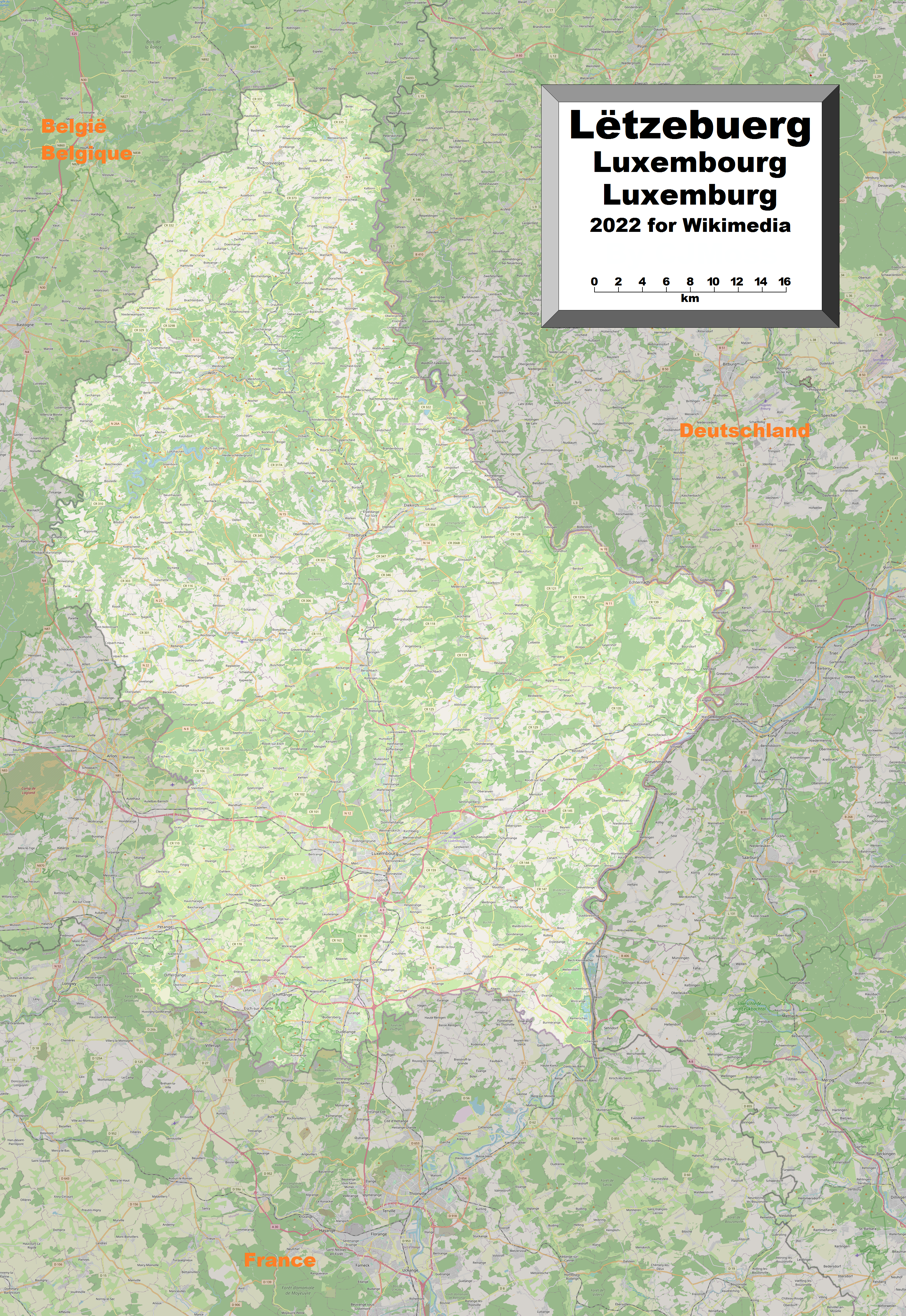
Detailed map of the Grand Duchy

Geographic coordinates: 49°45′N 6°10′E

Area:
total: 2 586 km^{2}
land: 2 586 km^{2}
water: 0 km^{2}

Natural resources: iron ore (no longer exploited), arable land

Land use:
arable land: 23.9%
permanent crops: 0.56%
other: 75.52% (2011)

Irrigated land: 10 km^{2} (including Belgium) (1993 est.)

Total renewable water resources: 3.1 km^{3}
