= Plug-in electric vehicles in Luxembourg =

As of January 2023, 1.94% of all vehicles in Luxembourg were electric. As of September 2022, 23% of new cars registered in Luxembourg were electric.

== Government policy ==
As of June 2022, the national government offers subsidies of up to €8,000 for electric car purchases; these subsidies are scheduled to last until March 2024.

As of May 2021, there was one battery electric vehicle in the national governmental fleet.

== Charging stations ==
As of September 2022, there were 1,344 public charging stations in Luxembourg.

As of January 2023, the national government subsidizes up to 50% of the cost of charging station installations in privately owned parking lots.
