= National symbols of Luxembourg =

The national flag

The Gëlle Fra national monument.

The civil ensign, depicting the red lion.

The national grandes armoires.

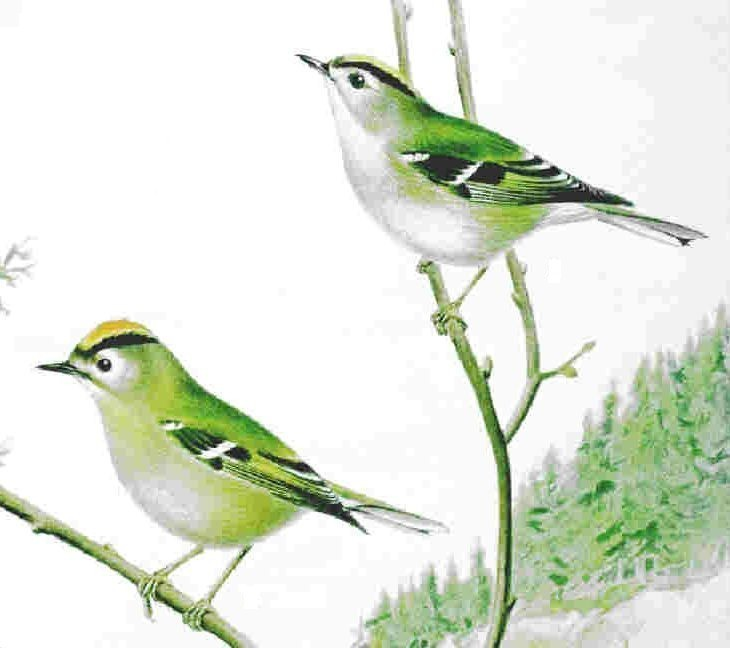
The national bird: the Goldcrest

There are a number of national symbols of Luxembourg, representing Luxembourg or its people in either official or unofficial capacities.

Under Luxembourgish law, 'national emblem' (French: emblèmes nationaux) is strictly defined as the national anthem, the national flag, the national coat of arms, and the national civil ensign. However, there are many other symbols, both official and unofficial, that symbolise the Luxembourgish nation in the public consciousness.

== List of national symbols ==
=== Official symbols ===
- Head of state - Grand Duke of Luxembourg (currently Guillaume V)
- National anthem - Ons Heemecht
- National coat of arms - Coat of arms of Luxembourg
- National flag - Flag of Luxembourg
- National holiday - Grand Duke's Official Birthday (23 June)
- National language - Luxembourgish

=== Unofficial symbols ===
- National animal - Red lion
- National bird - Goldcrest (Regulus regulus)
- National epic - Reynard
- National family - Grand Ducal Family
- National flower - Rose
- National monument - Gëlle Fra
- National motto - Mir wëlle bleiwe wat mir sinn (Luxembourgish for 'We wish to remain what we are')
- National patron saint
