= Social class in Luxembourg =

Grouping Luxembourgers by measure of social status

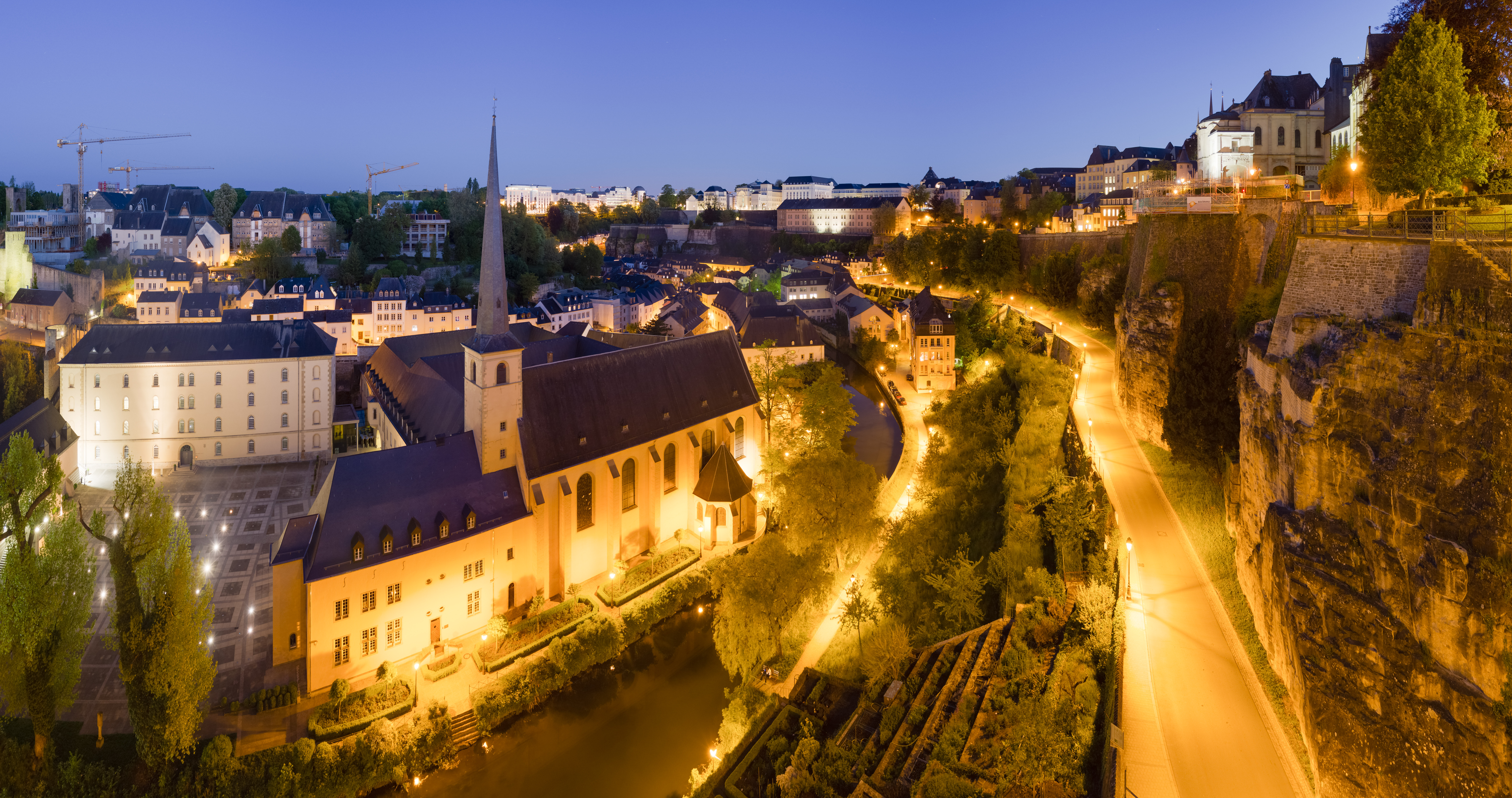
Luxembourg City Night Wikimedia Commons

Social class in Luxembourg after 1945 is generally based on occupation, personal income, spending power, and rights to social welfare rather than birth circumstances and family background. The country's demographic situation has changed considerably since 1945, where a mostly blue-collar working population gave way to mostly white-collar occupations over the second half of the twentieth century. Differences in consumer patterns between the white-collar and blue-collar workers decreased considerably between 1963 and 1977, causing a socio-economic evolution that saw a wider sphere of access for both working and middle classes to consumer goods such as cars, white goods, and real estate, thus demonstrating an equalisation of social strata in terms of income and spending power. The population of Luxembourg has also altered in nature due to significant growth in numbers of residents and increases in migration patterns since the mid-twentieth century; in 1961 13% of the population consisted of non-Luxembourgers, by 2020, this is at 44.3. At present, 47% of the Luxembourgish population has a migrant background’, and this is as a result of the response to socioeconomic processes that drew large numbers of immigrants to the country in the latter half of the twentieth century.

In the late 1950s, André Heiderscheid outlined the different social classes in Luxembourg as ‘milieu ouvrier’, ‘milieu agricole’, ‘classe moyenne’ and ‘milieu bourgeois’, in other words, working class, which forms the bulk of the working population and is mainly found in the secondary sector; the primary sector or agricultural class, which has seen a significant decrease in the latter half of the twentieth century; and proportionally smaller number of middle class and bourgeoisie. These categories are still applicable on a superficial basis, but social changes and improvements in living conditions in the past sixty years have meant that the working classes or those working within what are described traditionally as ‘lower income’ socioeconomic groups are often now on a par materially with those in traditional ‘middle income groups’, and what were typical ‘working-class’ occupations in terms of income have become more ‘office’ oriented, that is, employment in the tertiary sector. There are groups for whom personal income and access to social welfare pose problems, and poverty, unemployment and homelessness also exist in Luxembourg, although perhaps not to the same extent as in other European countries.

== The working classes ==
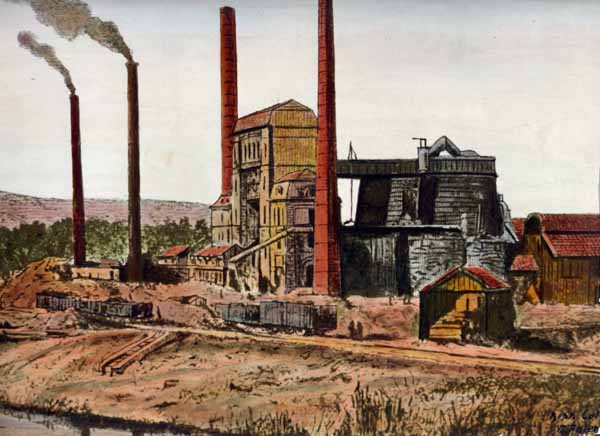
Steel industry in Schifflange (1870)

=== Post-war period ===
At the end of the Second World War, most of the working population in Luxembourg were involved in the industrial, mining, and construction sectors, and were considered essential to the social and infrastructural reconstruction of the country in the wake of Nazi occupation by Pierre Krier, the socialist Minister for Employment and strong supporter of those working in these areas. He aimed to re-establish and improve working conditions and social welfare benefits for the working classes in order to maintain social stability in post-war Luxembourg. Before World War II, the social welfare system in Luxembourg was well established and often better than in many other European countries. In 1950, the largest group of the working population was found in the steel and mining sectors at a total of 20,458. Ten years later, the numbers working in this sector were at their highest, at 24,120. The working classes in the industrial sector experienced a ‘golden age’ of relative prosperity between the late 1940s and 1970s where employees in this sector increased from 39.5% to almost half the working population at 46% in 1970, and was described as the ‘true backbone’ of Luxembourgish economy. From the 1960s, an average annual growth of 3.7% for working class salaries allowed for an increase in their purchasing power for articles once considered as rare luxuries such as cars and household goods which were seen as a measure of their materially improved lifestyles.

=== 1970s to today ===
The decline of the industrial sector after 1970 saw a downturn in the numbers employed within it, which by 2001 was 3,344 in the steel industry, the mining sector having disappeared by 1990, but this was tempered by the growth of the banking sector from the 1960s, offering alternative employment and eventually greatly increasing the number of employees within this discipline, so the workforce in Luxembourg moved from predominantly ‘blue-collar’ to predominantly ‘white-collar’ in the latter half of the twentieth century and beyond. At the same time, restructuring in the steel industry was beginning to affect numbers employed within it. Today, the steel industry accounts for 0.77% of the Luxembourgish workforce, and remains an important contributor to the economy, accounting for 14% of all exports. However, the decline of the steel industry in Luxembourg was not entirely negative, as the working population simply changed occupation and moved into the tertiary sector. By the 1990s Luxembourg was among the ‘top ten financial services centres in the world’.

Banking and financial services and service industries in general are now the largest sectors in the Luxembourgish economy and thus the largest employment providers. This situation has caused a considerable increase in temporary migratory work in Luxembourg, where people from Belgium, France and Germany, known as frontaliers, would travel in and out of the country on a daily basis for employment purposes. Frontaliers account for 44.3% of the Luxembourgish working population (2020), of which 23.90% are from Germany, 23.2% from Belgium and 50.2% from France. While not all frontaliers work in the financial sector, as at 2009 there were 10,114 working in this sector, counting for most of their number by several thousand.

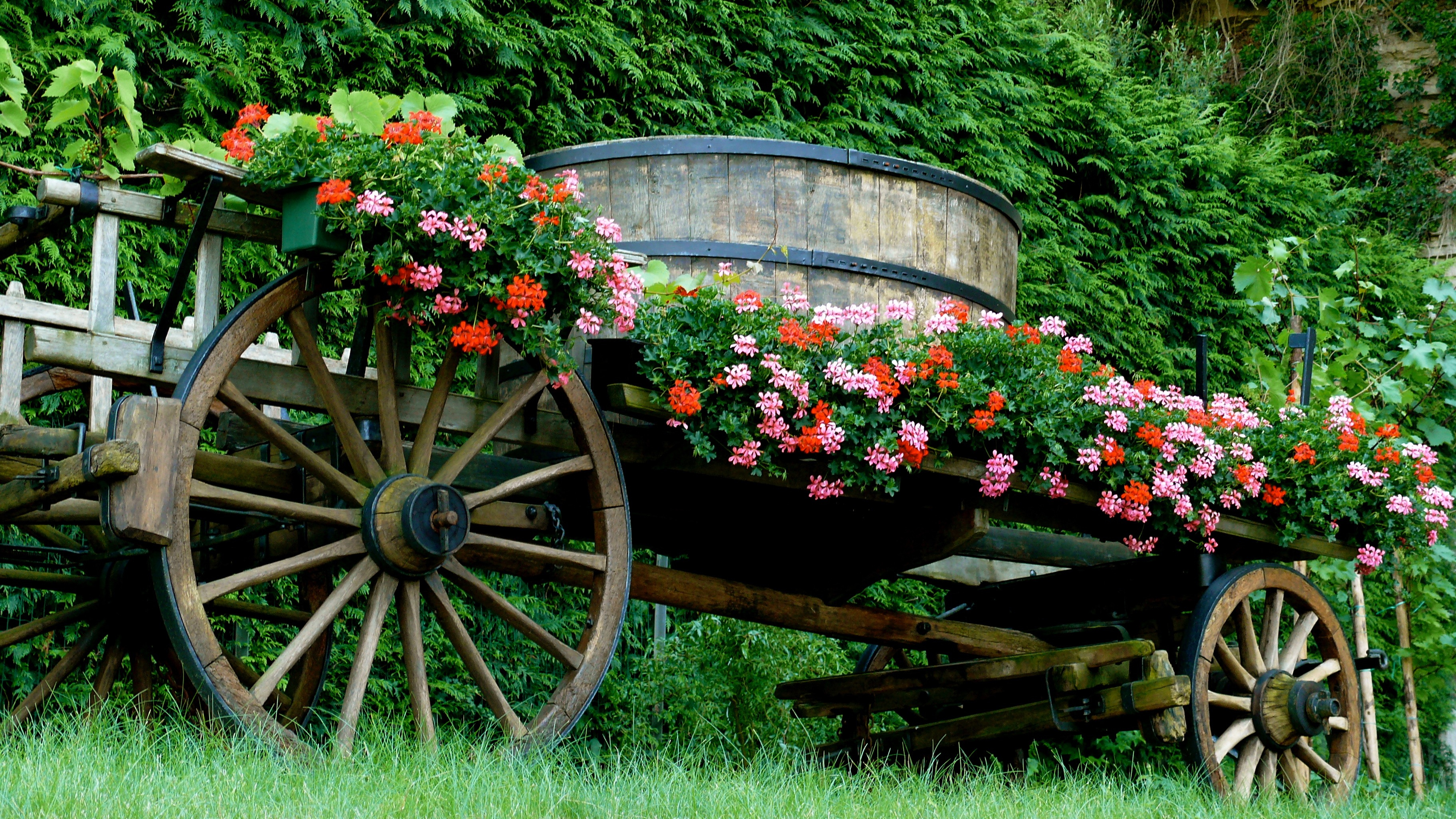
Pauerbidden at the Moselle, LU

== The agricultural classes ==
The agricultural classes in Luxembourg are seen as a ‘traditional class’, where generations of the same families owned and worked landholdings of varying sizes, although smallholdings were the most predominant type. Farming currently accounts for 1-3% of economic activity in Luxembourg and is subsidised by the government and the European Union. With the increase of industrialization in the late nineteenth century, more and more agricultural workers moved from the country to work in the industrial sector. It is also the case that some agricultural workers maintained a smallholding whilst also working in the steel or mining industries, and some still have a secondary occupation to farming – as at 2014, 645 agricultural workers out of 1,341 were listed as having ‘secondary occupations’. With regard to farming in Luxembourg, the late 1940s heralded a permanent change in the social landscape of the countryside; the farming community ‘lost out’ to growth in other economic areas; from the 1950s, landholdings of less than 10 hectares gradually disappeared, and between 1947 and 1970 16,400 people departed from the agricultural sector, where the Trente Glorieuses for the secondary sector was concurrent with permanent decline of one of the two socio-economic pillars of Luxembourgish society.

The percentage of workers in agriculture has continued to drop dramatically throughout the twentieth century and into the twenty-first century. In 1947 of a total of 134,288 workers in all sectors, there were 30,050 workers in agriculture, reducing to 9,641 in 1970 and by 2001 the number was only 3,321 members of the working population of 185,352. Most farms in Luxembourg are family-owned, but by 1990 the number in this category was 3,768 and by 2020 this number had reduced further to 1,881, with an increase in the amount of group holdings from 41 to 88 from 1990 to 2014. Agricultural activity in Luxembourg is mainly arable, viticulture, dairy and meat farming. The average area per land holding out of 2,042 farms in Luxembourg as at 2020 is 77.9 hectares, but most farms are of 100 ha and above at 521 of their total number, an increase in the amount of larger farms held since 1990, when lands held over 100ha counted at just 106. Another reason for the reduction in farming in Luxembourg is that much of the land has been sold off for construction to meet increasing demands for housing, and as land prices are high, this allows for landowners to benefit significantly from real estate income.

== The middle classes and ‘bourgeoisie’ ==
André Heiderscheid described this section of the population in the late 1950s/early 1960s as those who fall into the ‘middle income’ category, such as retailers, artisans, lower framework employees in industry and civil service and technicians, who quite quickly, for material reasons, became part of the general working classes. The ‘bourgeoisie’, according to the same observer, involves those who are employed in the higher levels of civil service, businessmen, and members of the liberal professions (law, medicine, architecture, accountancy, teaching), but where a true bourgeoisie class has had difficulty in full development because of a ‘lack of tradition’. This group accounts for a proportionally small section of the Luxembourgish population, although it has seen considerable growth over time, as in other socio-economic groups, and thus has been able to benefit from the unprecedented growth in the economy in the last sixty years. In 1965, for example, there were 324 doctors and dentists in Luxembourg, and in 2015 the number was 1,379; similarly, the number of those in the legal profession has risen from 130 in 1965 to 1,633 in 2015.

However, one particular group from Heiderscheid's assessment of the middle classes has lost out to economic growth; the individual shop-owner; the arrival of the first supermarket in Walferdange in 1967 seriously affected the livelihoods of the small, artisanal retailers. Relatively new occupations in the tertiary sector such as wealth management, investment advisory services and senior banking positions began developing and allowing for high incomes and standards of living usually associated with ‘traditional’ liberal professions categorised within the middle- and upper-middle classes. Education, especially to tertiary level, and the social mobility that goes with it, has also seen many move up from working class to middle class over the past 50 years.

Latterly, Luxembourg is often seen as synonymous with great wealth, although essentially this accounts for a very small proportion of the population. The Inaugural Wealth Report (2014) published by the Julius Baer Group stated that Luxembourg has the highest proportion of ‘millionaire households’ in Europe, with 22.7% of those in the higher income bracket possessing a net worth of over one million euros; real estate ownership is closely linked to this assertion. In terms of private wealth, Luxembourg also has the highest proportion in Europe, with adults worth on average 432,221 euros, and one third of the country's total private wealth of 31% is owned by just 1% of the richest section of the population, and since 2007, wealth in Luxembourg has grown by 36%, although this rate is low compared to that of Switzerland where the wealth growth rate was 68%.

== Unemployment and risk of poverty ==
=== Living standards ===
Current standards of living in Luxembourg are very high, and according to the OECD, Luxembourg has a much higher than average household net adjusted disposable income per capita measured at the equivalent of US$39,264 per annum (OECD average US$33,604 pa), and a slightly lower number, 66%, of the working population aged 15 to 64 are in paid employment than the OECD average of 68%. Employees working long hours account for 4% of the working population in Luxembourg, well below the OECD average of 11%, and housing conditions in Luxembourg are slightly better than the OECD average at 1.9 rooms per person as opposed to 1.8 rooms per person elsewhere.

=== Risk of poverty ===
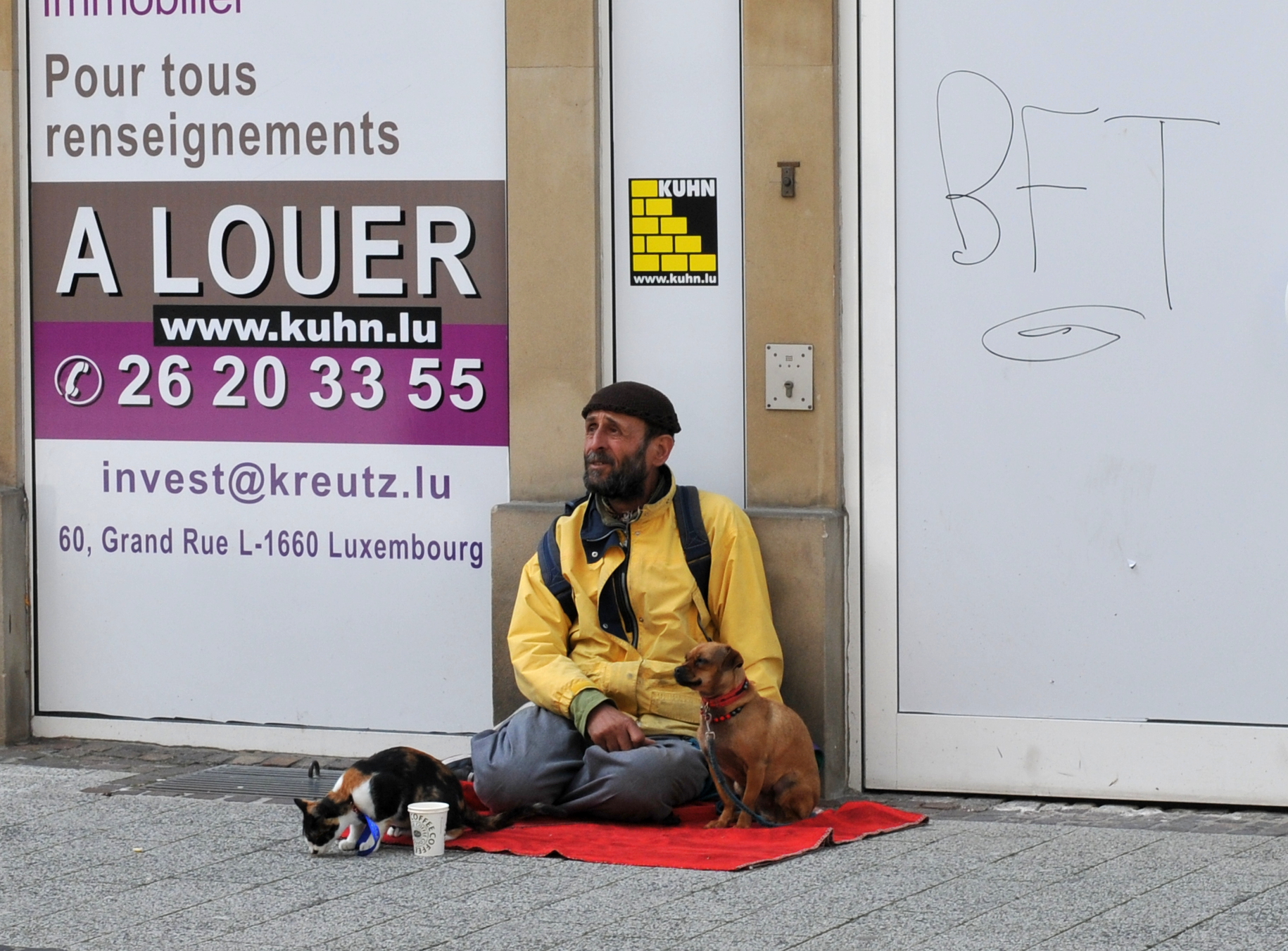
Beggar in Luxembourg City, in the Grande Rue

The unemployment rate in Luxembourg is relatively low compared with other European countries. Income inequality and poverty are also less significant on an international scale. In 2020, the unemployed in Luxembourg amounted to 18,700 individuals or 6.3% of the population, 2% higher than ten years previously. Those unemployed for more than a year count for half of individuals without work. In 2016 in terms of job security and social welfare, the expected loss of earnings resulting from unemployment is lower than the OECD average of 6.3% at 2.1%. By exploring median percentages relating to Luxembourg's particular ‘sensitivity’ the poverty line, Allegrezza found that while ‘extreme poverty’ is ‘non-existent’, at the same time there is a relatively important number of the population that is ‘at risk of becoming poor’, in other words, a minor degradation in salary may induce poverty. However, the non-working population, that is, children and the elderly, display divergent results in relation to risk of poverty; the risk to the elderly in Luxembourg has reduced considerably from the 1990s, with a less than 1% incidence of poverty in this demographic group. On the other hand, children in Luxembourg seem to be at a more significant risk with many living in ‘households that are at imminent risk of poverty’, in spite of a comparatively larger social welfare benefit system.

=== Homelessness ===
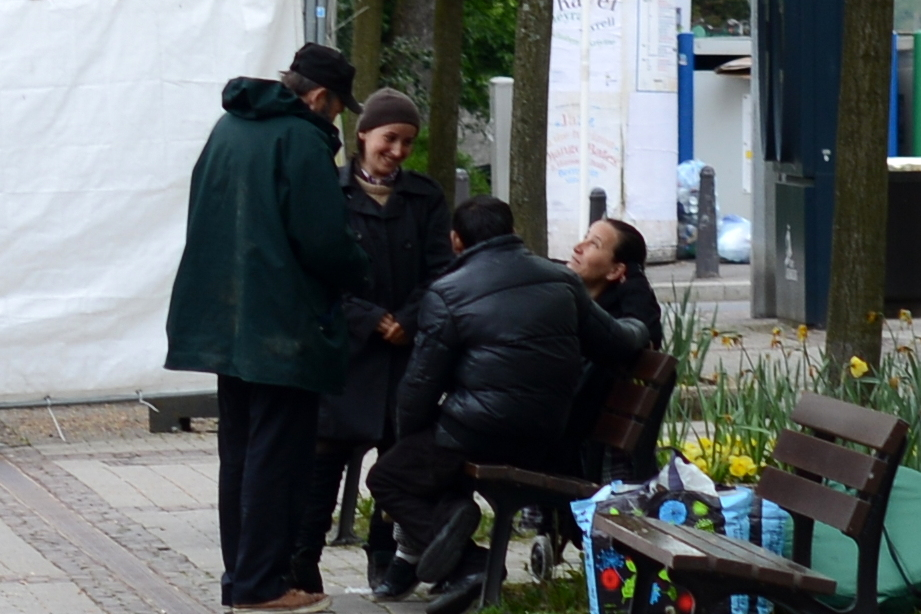
Homeless people in Luxembourg City

Homelessness is also present in Luxembourg, with a FEANTSA study in 2007 revealing 715 individuals without permanent fixed accommodation. In a 2013 report by the Ministry of Family and Integration, around 30 different nationalities were identified among the homeless users of night shelters. A large proportion at 48% were from Luxembourg, 40% were from other EU member states, mostly France, Portugal or Italy and 12% were other nationalities.
