= Military history of Luxembourg =

The military history of Luxembourg is central to the formation of Luxembourg as a nation, which started around Luxembourg Castle in 963. A place of strategic military significance, Luxembourg had been fortified since the 10th century by over 50,000 m^{2} (538,195.52 sq ft) of walls and towers. Ruled by the House of Luxembourg in the early medieval period, Luxembourg was subsequently invaded by the Bourbons, Habsburgs, Hohenzollerns, and the French, among others.

== 19th century ==
After the defeat of Napoleon in 1815, Luxembourg was disputed between Prussia and the Netherlands.

The Belgian Revolution of 1830–1839 reduced Luxembourg's territory by more than half, as the predominantly francophone western part of the country was transferred to Belgium. Luxembourg's independence was reaffirmed by the 1839 First Treaty of London and again by the 1867 Second Treaty of London after the Luxembourg Crisis nearly led to war between Prussia and France. The King of the Netherlands remained Head of State as Grand Duke of Luxembourg, maintaining personal union between the two countries until 1890. At the death of William III, the Dutch throne passed to his daughter Wilhelmina, while Luxembourg (at that time restricted to male heirs by the Nassau Family Pact) passed to Adolph of Nassau-Weilburg.

On 16 February 1881, the Corps des Gendarmes et Volontaires (Corps of Gendarmes and Volunteers) was established. It comprises two companies, one of gendarmes and one of volunteers.

== Luxembourg Rebellions ==
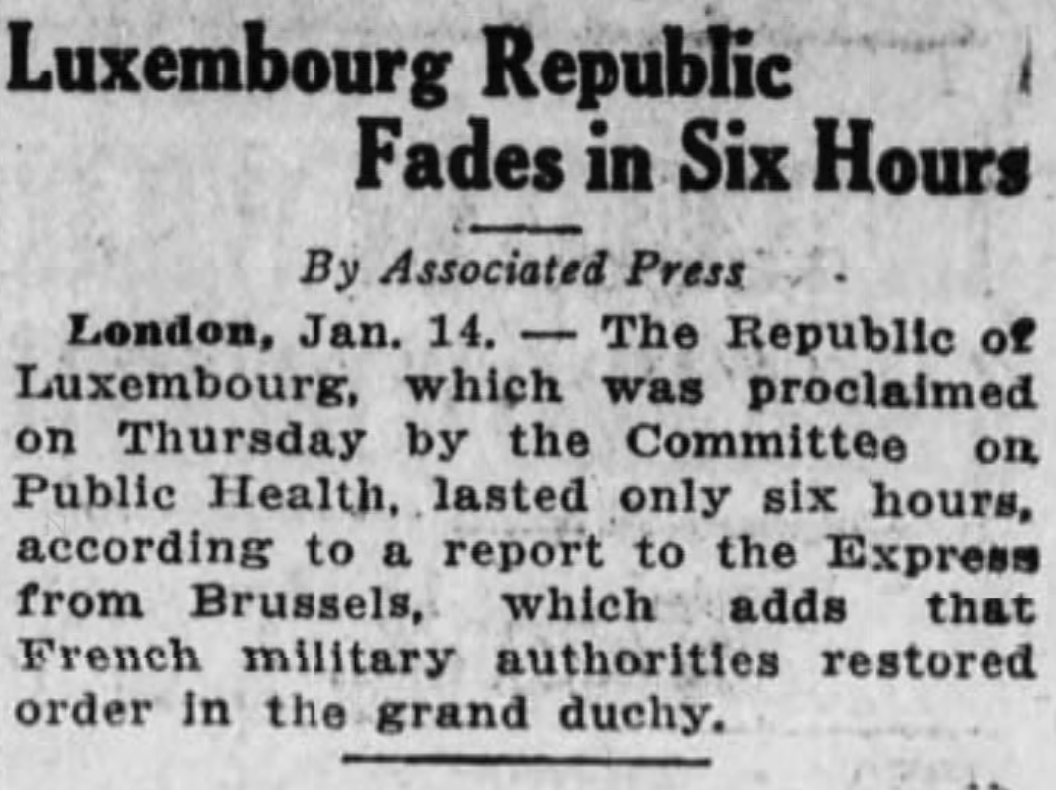
Newspaper on the rebellion by the Associated Press

In November 1918, Luxembourg experienced minor communist uprisings in Luxembourg City on the 10th and Esch-sur-Alzette on the 11th, swiftly quelled by the police. This prompted socialist and liberal members of the Chamber of Deputies to propose the abdication of Grand Duchess Marie Adelaide, a narrowly defeated motion. The following month, a mutiny attempt occurred among soldiers at the Luxembourg City barracks. On January 9, 1919, the same coalition of socialist and liberal deputies advocated for establishing a republic. Their motion led to a large gathering at the Corps of Volunteers' barracks. Émile Servais, a left-wing politician, called for a republic in a speech to the crowd, which then stormed the Chamber of Deputies. When the Corps of Volunteers refused to disperse the crowd, some deputies fled, while the remaining left-wing deputies formed the Committee of Public Safety under Servais' leadership. However, lacking public support, the committee quickly dissolved after General de La Tour of the French Army intervened to stabilize the situation.

== World War II ==
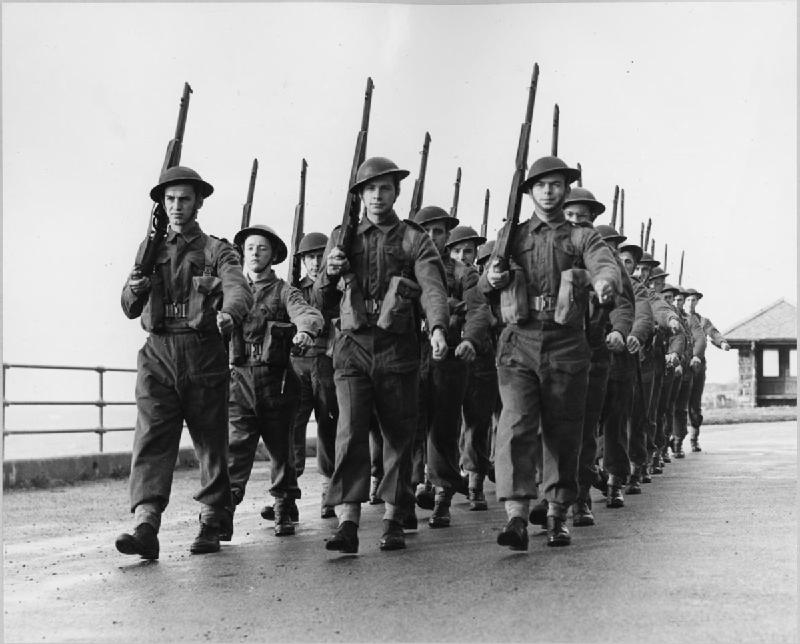
Soldiers from Luxembourg training in an English town during World War II.

During World War II, Luxembourg abandoned its policy of neutrality when it joined the Allies in fighting Nazi Germany. It was again invaded and subject to German occupation in the Second World War in 1940 and was formally annexed into the Third Reich in 1942. Its government was exiled to London, and a small group of volunteers were set up to participate in the Normandy invasion. It became a founding member of the United Nations in 1946 and of NATO in 1949. Luxembourg's contribution to its defence and NATO consists of a small army (currently consisting of around 800 people). As a landlocked country, it has no navy.

== Korean War ==
During the Korean War, Luxembourg contributed a 44-man contingent, attached to the Belgian contingent, to the United Nations force. Luxembourg achieved the dual distinction of deploying the largest proportion of its military force (10%) amongst all states contributing to the United Nations forces and suffering the highest proportion of casualties (more than one-third) amongst all United Nations contingents.

== Present ==
Luxembourg also lacks an air force, though the seventeen NATO AWACS aeroplanes are registered as Luxembourg aircraft for convenience. In accordance with a joint agreement with Belgium, both countries have provided funding for one A400M military cargo plane, currently on order. Luxembourg still jointly maintains three NATO Boeing 707 model TCAs (for cargo and training purposes) based at NATO Air Base Geilenkirchen.
