= Law of Luxembourg =

The law of Luxembourg is civil law. From the Tenth Century to the Fifteenth Century the law of the Grand Duchy was customary law.

== Constitution ==
There were constitutions of 1841, 1848, 1856 and 1868. The constitution was revised in 1919, 1948 and 1987.

== Legislation ==
The legislature is the Chamber of Deputies.

Legislation includes règlements grand-ducaux.

=== List of legislation ===
List of codes:

- Code of Criminal Procedure (French: Code de procédure pénale)
- Commercial Code (French: Code de commerce)
- Labour Code
- Penal Code

Other legislation:

- Education Law of 1912
- Law on euthanasia and assisted suicide (2009)

== Courts and judiciary ==
There is a Constitutional Court.

== Legal practitioners ==
Practitioners include avocats. There is professional secrecy.

== Criminal law ==
There is a Penal Code of 1879 and a Code of Criminal Procedure (French: Code de procédure pénale; formerly called Code d'instruction criminelle).

== Company and partnership law ==
A special limited partnership is possible.

== Labour law ==
There is a Labour Code.

== See also ==
- Taxation in Luxembourg
