= Energy in Luxembourg =

Energy in Luxembourg describes energy and electricity production, consumption and import in Luxembourg. Electricity sector in Luxembourg is the main article of electricity in Luxembourg.

Primary energy use in Luxembourg was 48 TWh in 2009, or 98 TWh per million inhabitants.

Luxembourg is a net energy importer; 81.5% of the electricity consumed in the country, for example, was imported from neighboring European countries in 2021.

== Overview ==
Energy in Luxembourg
	Capita	Prim. energy	Production	Import	Electricity	CO_{2}-emission
	Million	TWh	TWh	TWh	TWh	Mt
2004	0.45	55	0.8	54	7.5	11.3
2007	0.48	49	0.9	53	7.8	10.7
2008	0.49	48	0.9	52	7.8	10.4
2009	0.50	46	1.3	50	7.2	10.0
2012	0.52	48	1.4	52	8.05	10.43
2012R	0.53	47.6	1.5	50.6	7.80	10.22
2013	0.55	46.2	1.6	49.0	7.71	9.77
Change 2004-09	11.1%	-16.8%	57.1%	-8.6%	-3.8%	-11.4%
Mtoe = 11.63 TWh, Prim. energy includes energy losses 2012R = CO_{2} calculation criteria changed, numbers updated

There was no decline in the climate change gas emissions (CO_{2}) from year 2008 to 2012 in Luxembourg. There was no better efficiency in the use of electricity from 2008 to 2012.

== Electricity ==
In 2008, electricity use per person in Luxembourg was 2.6 times greater than in the United Kingdom.

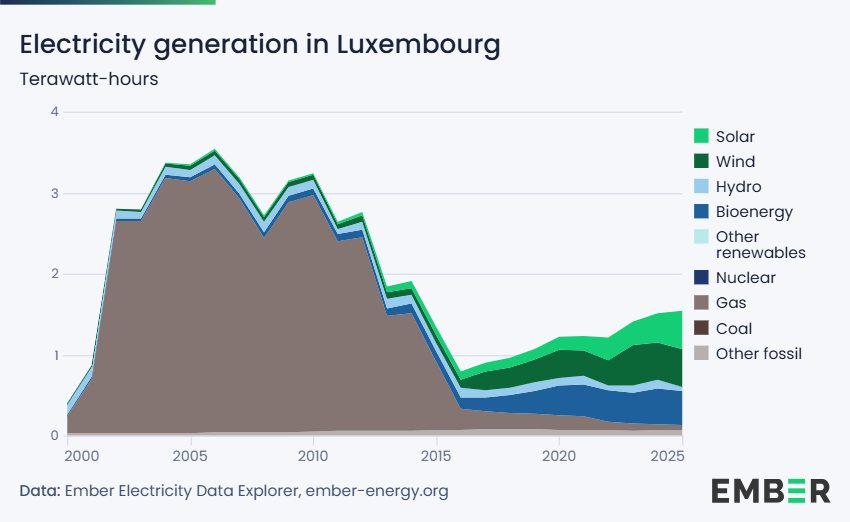
Electricity generation in Luxembourg in terawatt-hours

Luxembourg has not nuclear power plants, research reactors or nuclear fuel-cycle facilities, either operating or planned. The 1970s energy crisis led Luxembourg to briefly consider constructing a nuclear power plant. In 1972 RWE and the government negotiated a project to build a 1,200 MW nuclear reactor along the Moselle river near Remerschen. In 1974 there were already signs that there was little support for the project among public opinion. The opposition to the project grew, and became more organized, ultimately forcing the government to cancel the project at the end of 1977.

Subsequently, the construction of the large French Cattenom Nuclear Power Plant in 1979 close to the Luxembourg border caused tensions between the two countries.

== Renewable energy ==
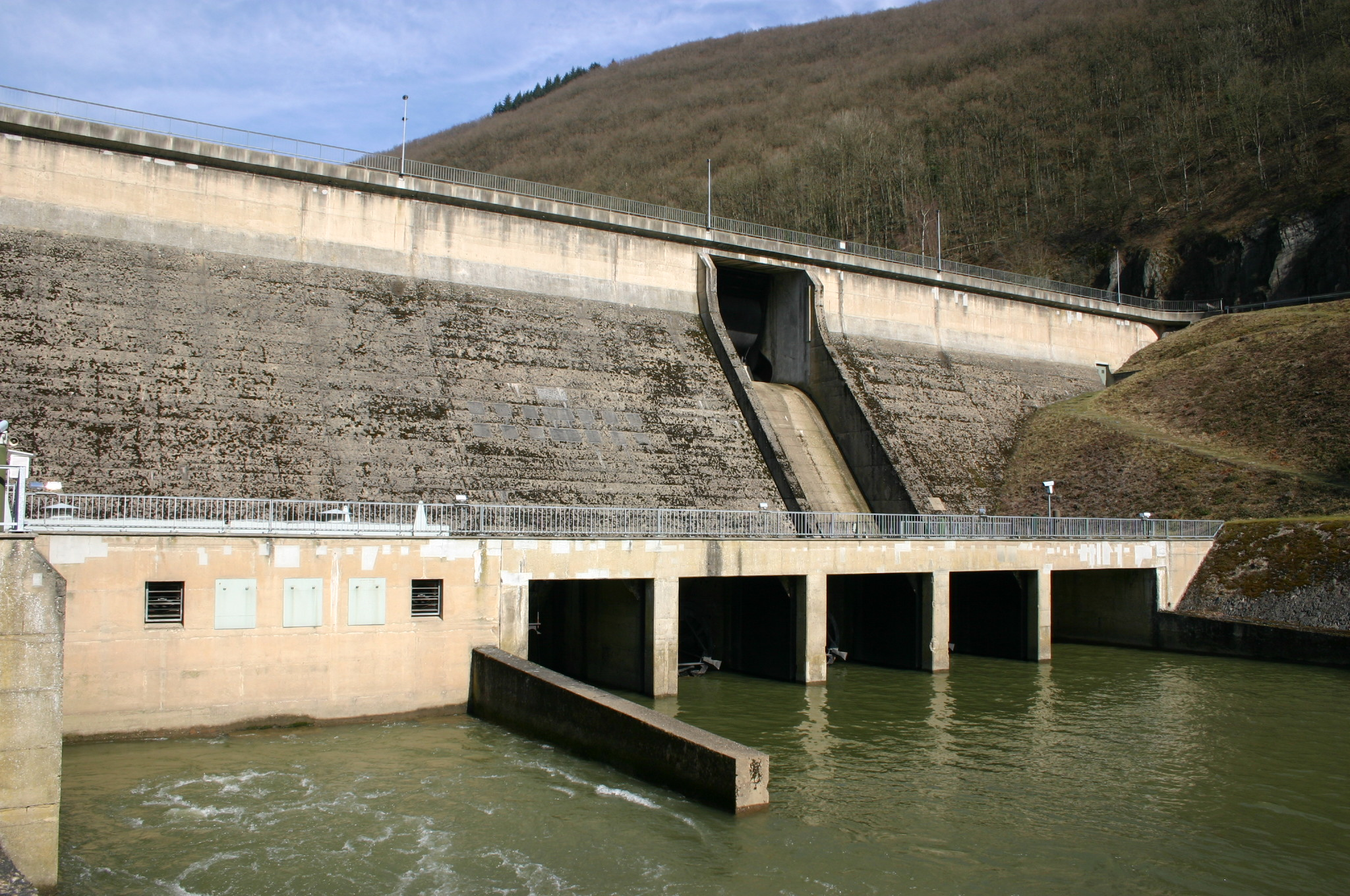
Vianden Pumped Storage Plant in Diekirch District

By 2021, renewable energy produced 80% of electricity generated in Luxembourg, comprising wind power at 26%, solar power at 17%, hydro power at 8%, and other renewables (bioenergy, etc) at 29%.

Luxembourg firms are less likely than those throughout the EU to invest in onsite/offsite renewable energy generation (26% versus 41%) and energy efficiency (43% against 59%). Energy prices are also cited by Luxembourgish businesses (84%) as uncertainty about the future as their top long-term investment obstacles.

== Climate change ==
Emissions of carbon dioxide in total, per capita in 2007 were 22.4 tons CO_{2} compared to EU 27 average 7.9 tons CO_{2}.

1990 emissions were 13 Mt CO_{2}_{eq}. Kyoto Protocol target is reduction of 4 Mt (28%).

In Luxembourg, 54% of enterprises have invested in mitigating weather-related consequences and lowering carbon emissions. This is close to the current EU average of 56%.

== See also ==
- Cegedel
- List of ministers for energy of Luxembourg
