= Guttland =

Region of Luxembourg

Coordinates: 49.7°N 6.2°E

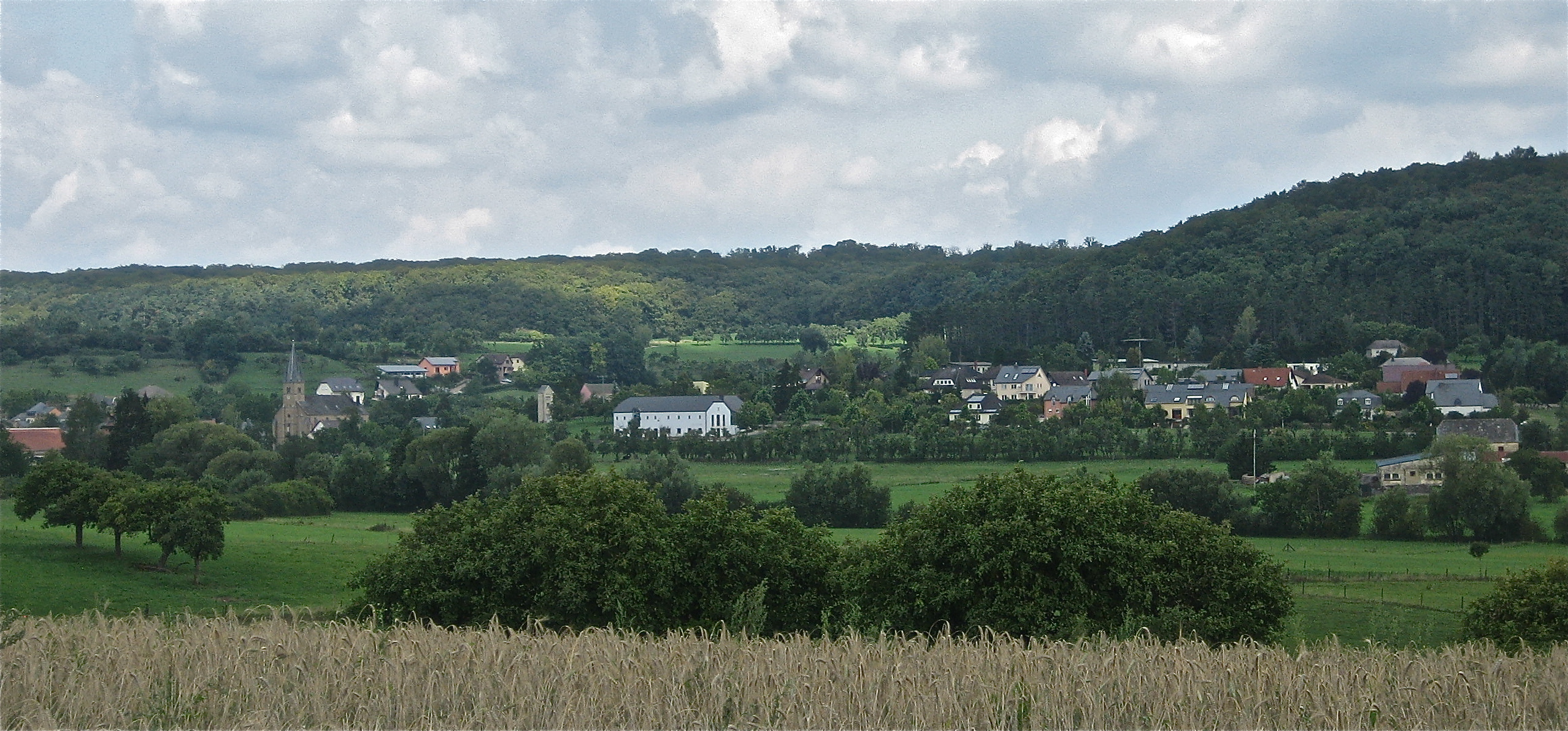
Guttland landscape near Bech, (Echternach Canton)

Guttland (German: Gutland) is a region covering the southern and central parts of the Grand Duchy of Luxembourg. Guttland (literally "Good Land") covers 68% of the territory of Luxembourg; to its north lies Éislek, which covers the remaining 32% of the Grand Duchy. To the east, the Luxembourgish Guttland adjoins the Bitburger Gutland of Germany.

Guttland is not an homogeneous region, and includes five main sub-regions: the Valley of the Seven Castles, Little Switzerland, the Luxembourg plateau, the Moselle Valley, and the Red Lands. Despite its variety, it does have general geographic characteristics, either physical or human, that separate it from Éislek.

Unlike the sparsely populated Éislek, Guttland is relatively urbanised. Whereas Éislek has only one town with a population larger than 5,000 people, Guttland has four cities with a population largely above 20,000 (Luxembourg City, Esch-sur-Alzette, Differdange and Dudelange). However, Guttland's urban areas are mostly congregated in the cantons of Esch-sur-Alzette, Luxembourg, Capellen and Mersch, whereas some other parts of Guttland (cantons of Redange, Echternach, Grevenmacher and Remich) are almost as sparsely populated as Éislek region.

Guttland has a lower altitude above sea level and a flatter landscape than Éislek. Geologically, Guttland is predominantly a large Jurassic-Triassic sandstone formation, part of the Lorrainian system; Éislek is predominantly Devonian schist and quartz. Both are wooded, but Éislek's forests are more numerous and thicker, a testament to the slower pace of human development in Éislek. Most of Guttland is fertile agricultural territory - hence the name.
