= Prostitution in Luxembourg =

Prostitution in Luxembourg is in itself legal, and is common, but activities associated with organised prostitution, such as profiting from (operating brothels and prostitution rings) or aiding prostitution, are illegal. Human trafficking incurs severe penalties. There are estimated to be 300 prostitutes in Luxembourg, most of whom are immigrants.

In February 2018, the Chamber of Deputies approved a bill to criminalise the clients of prostitutes who were trafficked, exploited, a "vulnerable person" or minor.

== Street prostitution ==
Street prostitution is only permitted in two streets near Luxembourg City's railway station, and only between 20:00 and 03:00. The area is regulated by the city authorities, and patrolled regularly by the police. Prostitutes working outside these streets or outside the permitted times may be arrested and fined up to €2,500. Because of the number of prostitutes and limited area to work in, some work from other streets near the legalised area and risk being arrested. The number of prostitutes has increased due, at least in part, to demand from French men following the changes in France's prostitution laws. The spread of prostitutes into adjoining streets coupled with drug activity and gang violence has resulted in police closing some streets in the area to traffic at night and having high-profile foot patrols.

== National Action Plan (NAP) for Prostitution ==
The authorities have been working towards a national prostitution strategy for a number of years. A survey of public opinion was carried out online between 2007 and 2012. Some supported following the 'Nordic Model' (where the client is criminalised), and others supported a regulated system such as in the Netherlands and Germany. The National Council of Women of Luxembourg wanted the outright abolition of prostitution. Ministers visited the Netherlands and Sweden and there was a parliamentary debate on prostitution in April 2015.

The first measure to come out of the discussions was the 'EXIT strategy' in 2014. A government-funded scheme, run by the Luxembourg Red Cross, to provide shelters, support, and advice to those women who want to exit prostitution. Vocational training would also be provided by ADEM (Employment Development Agency).

The NAP was announced by Minister of Equal Opportunities, Lydia Mutsch, and Minister of Justice, Félix Braz, in June 2016. The NAP did not criminalise prostitutes or clients, but its goal was to make prostitution safer. A draft law was presented to parliament "strengthening the fight against the exploitation of prostitution, pimping and human trafficking for sexual purposes".

== Sex trafficking ==
Luxembourg is a destination country for women and children subjected to sex trafficking. Victims of sex trafficking from Europe, Africa, Asia, and South America are exploited in prostitution in cabarets, private apartments, and on the street. Groups vulnerable to trafficking include unaccompanied foreign children and people in Luxembourg's legal and illegal commercial sex industry.

Luxembourg prohibits all forms of sex and labor trafficking through articles 382-1 and 382-2 of the criminal code. The prescribed penalties range from three to 10 years imprisonment for adult trafficking and 10 to 20 years imprisonment for child trafficking. In 2016, the government reported initiating eight investigations for sex trafficking, the same number as the previous year. The government convicted 11 traffickers for sex trafficking in 2016, an increase compared with five in 2015.

The United States Department of State Office to Monitor and Combat Trafficking in Persons ranks Luxembourg as a 'Tier 1' country.
