= Telecommunications in Luxembourg =

Luxembourg is recognized for establishing local television and radio stations abroad. The RTL Group, originating from Luxembourg, operates in numerous countries. Additionally, Luxembourg is the base for SES, a leading global satellite operator.

In the 2022 Digital Economy and Society Index (DESI), among the 27 European Union (EU) members, Luxembourg is placed 6th in Human Capital, with 64% of its population possessing basic digital skills, exceeding the EU average of 54%. Additionally, in Information and Communication Technology (ICT), the country mirrors the EU average with 20% female ICT specialists. For Connectivity, it ranks 11th, with 91% uptake in fixed broadband and 96% in mobile broadband, both figures exceeding the EU averages of 78% and 87%, respectively. The country is 18th in Integration of Digital Technology, as Small and Medium-sized Enterprises (SMEs) show a 54% digital intensity level, slightly below the EU average of 55%. In Digital Public Services, Luxembourg ranks 7th with an e-government user rate of 79%, exceeding the EU's 65%.

== User statistics ==
- Telephones - main lines in use: 314,700 (1999)
- Telephones - mobile cellular: 215,741 (2000)
- Telephone system: highly developed, completely automated and efficient system, mainly buried cables
  - domestic: nationwide cellular telephone system; buried cable
  - international: 3 channels leased on TAT-6 coaxial submarine cable (Europe to North America)
- Radio broadcast stations: AM 2, FM 9, shortwave 2 (1999)
- Radios: 285,000 (1997)
- Television broadcast stations: 5 (1999)
- Televisions: 285,000 (1998 est.)
- Internet Service Providers (ISPs): 8 (2000) Note: Work has started in 2006 on a citywide WiFi project called Hotcity.
- Internet users: 636,000 (2022)
- Country code (Top-level domain): .lu

== Internet ==
=== Fixed broadband ===
Luxembourg's fixed broadband sector exhibits a 91% uptake rate, exceeding the EU's 78% average. Additionally, 63% of Luxembourg households have access to broadband speeds of at least 100 Mbps, above the EU's 41%. The country's digital infrastructure includes 96% coverage in very high capacity networks (VHCN) and 75% in fibre to the premises (FTTP), both higher than the EU averages of 70% and 50%, respectively.

=== Mobile broadband ===
The country demonstrates solid performance in mobile broadband with an uptake rate of 96%, higher than the EU average of 87%. The country is advancing its 5G capabilities, achieving an assigned 5G spectrum of 61%, slightly above the EU average of 56%. However, 5G coverage lags behind, with a notably lower coverage rate of 13% compared to the EU average of 66%

=== Digital public services ===
In the domain of digital public services, Luxembourg ranks 7th within the EU. Notably, 79% of the country's internet users actively utilize e-government solutions, representing a significant increase compared to the prior year and to the EU average of 65%. This accomplishment is attributed to the "Electronic Governance 2021-2025" strategy, jointly developed by the Ministry for Digitalisation and the Government IT Centre (CTIE), with the goal of facilitating the transition to a digital government model. Luxembourg actively promotes innovation and modernization through initiatives such as the Guichet.lu portal, electronic authentication certificates, and the introduction of numerous online administrative procedures. The country continues its efforts to enhance open data availability, currently standing at 66%, which is below the EU average of 81%.

== Television and radio ==
Luxembourg maintains a pan-European broadcasting presence through the RTL Group, offering a wide array of radio and television services, especially in France, Germany, and the UK. The nation hosts SES, Europe's leading satellite operator, managing the Astra satellite fleet. Locally, outlets such as RTL Tele Letzebuerg and Nordliicht TV provide content for Luxembourg's audiences, while radio platforms like RTL Radio Letzebuerg and EldoRadio present diverse programming. Luxembourg's media landscape benefits from constitutional protections for freedom of speech and the press.
