= Geology of Luxembourg =

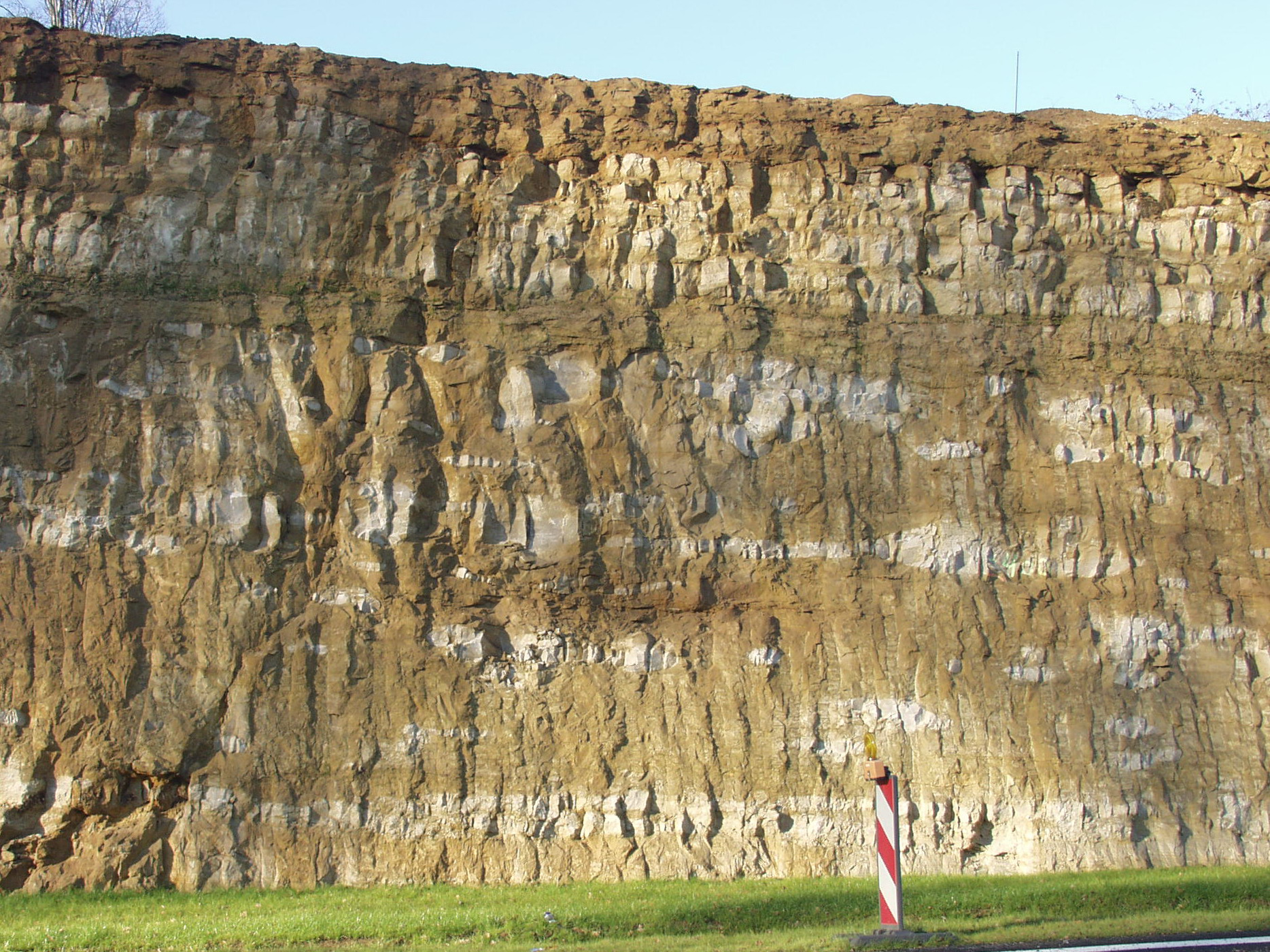
Lower Jurassic sandstone of the Grès de Luxembourg Formation near Waldhof

The geology of Luxembourg is divided into two geologic regions: Rheinisches Schiefergeblige in the north, extending into the Ardennes region in Belgium, and the Oesling (also known as Islek) Zone to the north of Ettelbruck. Luxembourg is underlain by the Hercynian orogeny related Givonne Anticlinorium, which mainly contains Early Devonian sandstone and shale. Rocks closer to the surface are primarily from the Cretaceous and are cut by the Sauer River and its tributaries.

Geologists draw parallels between the Gutland Zone, south of the Hercynian fold belt, and the Lorraine region of France. This "schichstufen" plateau and scarp landscape is made up of gently dipping Triassic red beds and Jurassic limestone and shale. Middle Jurassic rocks contain sedimentary iron ore. These Mesozoic rocks in the center of the country are sometimes referred to as the Luxembourg Gulf and are cut by small river valleys. The sedimentary and metamorphic rocks in the country are 6.2 kilometers thick, with very thin 30 meter and 10 meter sequences from the Eocene, Miocene and Pliocene, within the last 66 million years of the Cenozoic.

Except for intense faulting in the Gutland Zone, most rocks are only gently folded, reflecting very distant tectonic activity. Warm, wet and arid, cold periods alternated during the last 2.5 million years of the Quaternary.

Luxembourg's emergence as an industrialized country stemmed from iron and steel industries in the 19th century extracting thin Cenozoic pisolitic iron ores and later oolite iron ores in the Differdange and Esch basins from the Jurassic. Also known as minette ore, these deposits comprise hydrated iron oxides, but rarely magnetite and hematite. These Jurassic ores were eventually depleted by the late 20th century. Most groundwater in the country is drawn from the Luxembourg Sandstone, which is up to 100 meters thick and produces 65 million cubic meters of water annually.
