= Mir wëlle bleiwe wat mir sinn =

National motto of Luxembourg

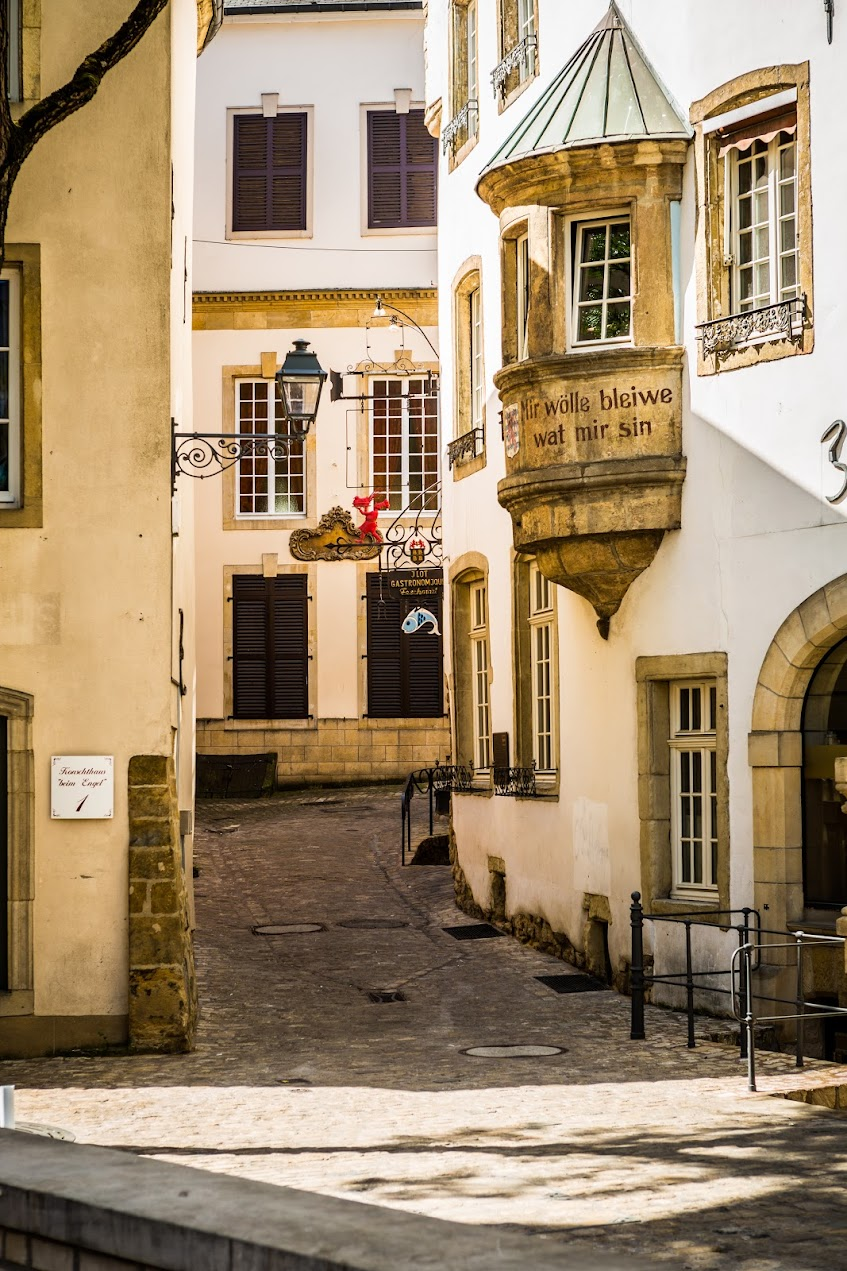
Another view of the façade of the Monkey's Bar on the Rue de la Loge, Luxembourg, bearing the motto Mir wölle bleiwe wat mir sin

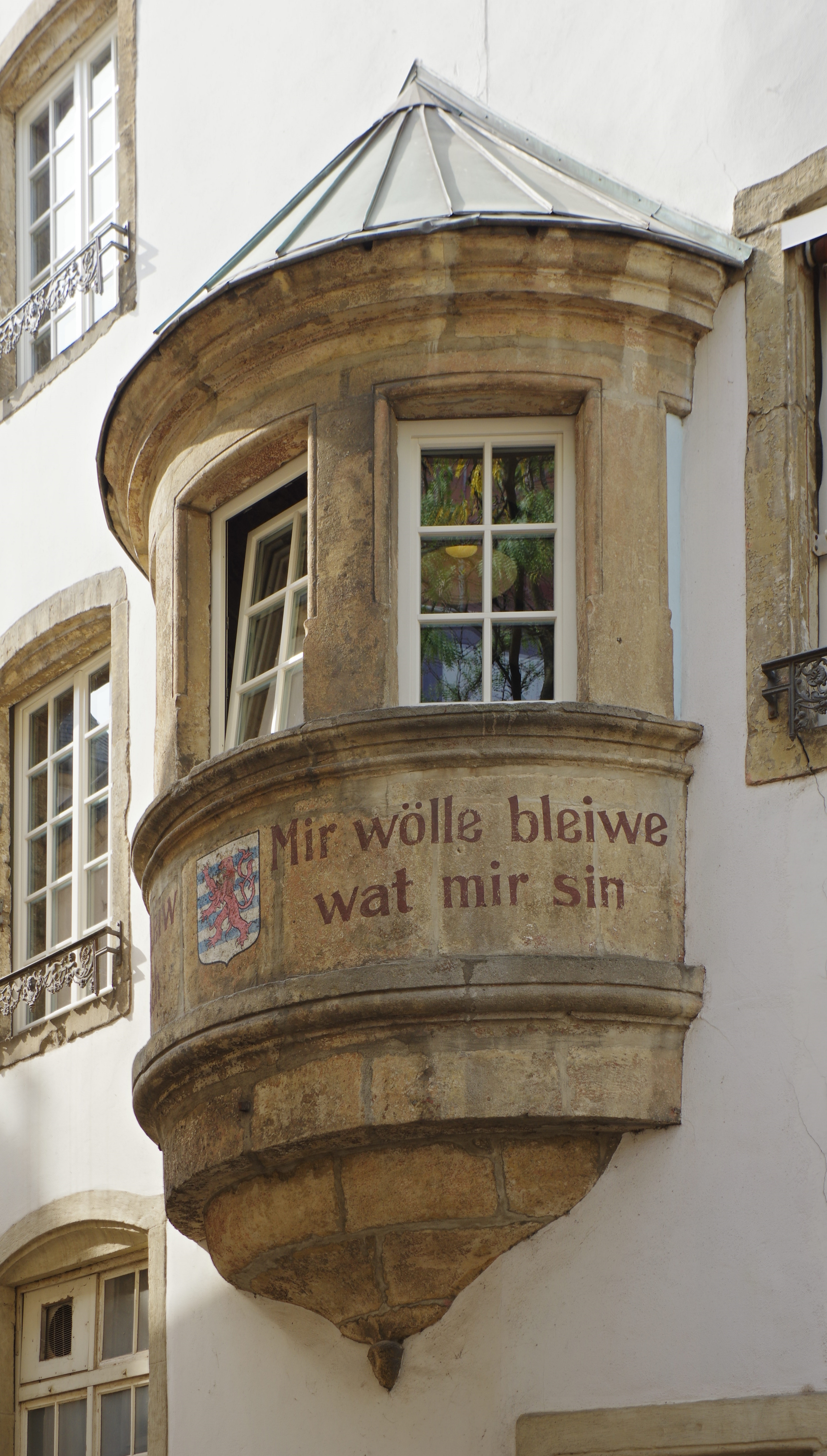
Façade of the Monkey's Bar on the Rue de la Loge, Luxembourg, bearing the motto Mir wölle bleiwe wat mir sin

Mir wëlle bleiwe wat mir sinn (Note: Archaic spelling: Mir wölle bleiwe wat mir sin) (IPA: [miːɐ̯ ˈvələ ˈblɑɪvə vɑt miːɐ̯ ˈzin]; lit. 'We want to stay what we are') is the national motto of Luxembourg. It is also translated into the country's other two official languages, French and German, although they do not have the status of a national language: Nous voulons rester ce que nous sommes (French) and Wir wollen bleiben, was wir sind (German). The motto refers to the ambition of the Luxembourgish people to retain their independent identity and sovereignty.

== Origin and history ==
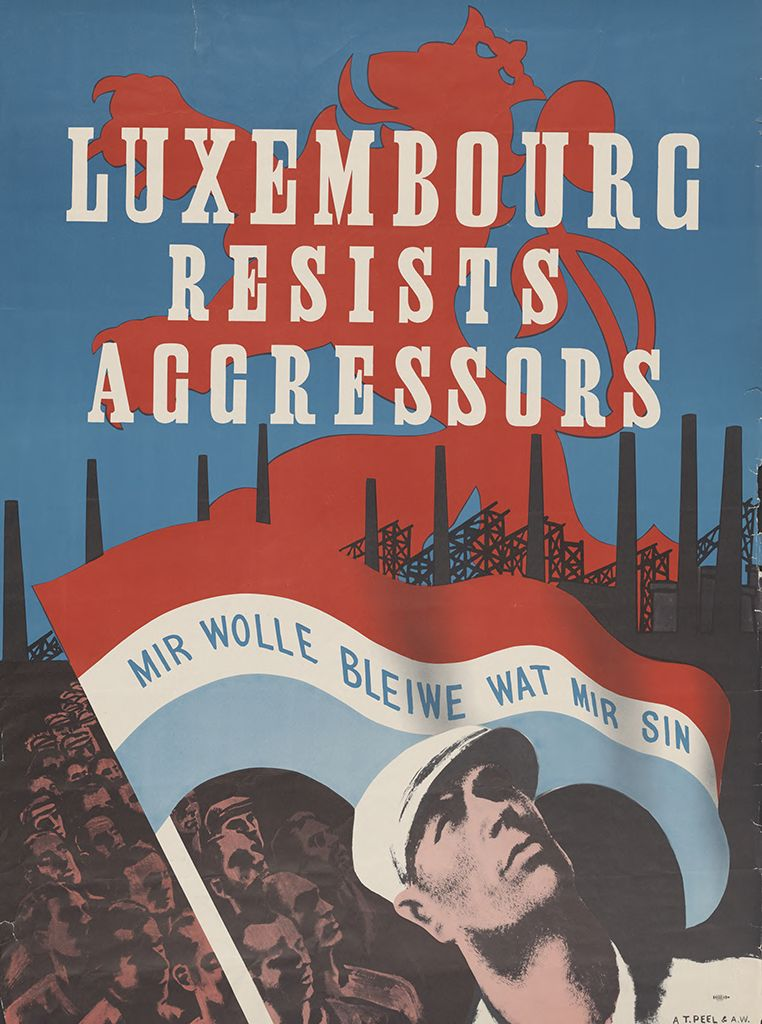
World War II-era propaganda poster, when Luxembourg was under German occupation

The phrase's origin can be traced back to De Feierwon, a patriotic song written in 1859 to pay homage to the country's first international railway. Its chorus reads:

Kommt hier aus Frankräich, Belgie, Preisen,
Mir wellen iech ons Hémecht weisen,
Frot dir no alle Säiten hin,
Mir welle bleiwe wat mir sin.

In English, this reads:

Come here from France, Belgium, Prussia,
we want to show you our fatherland
ask in all directions,
We want to stay what we are.
