= Disability in Luxembourg =

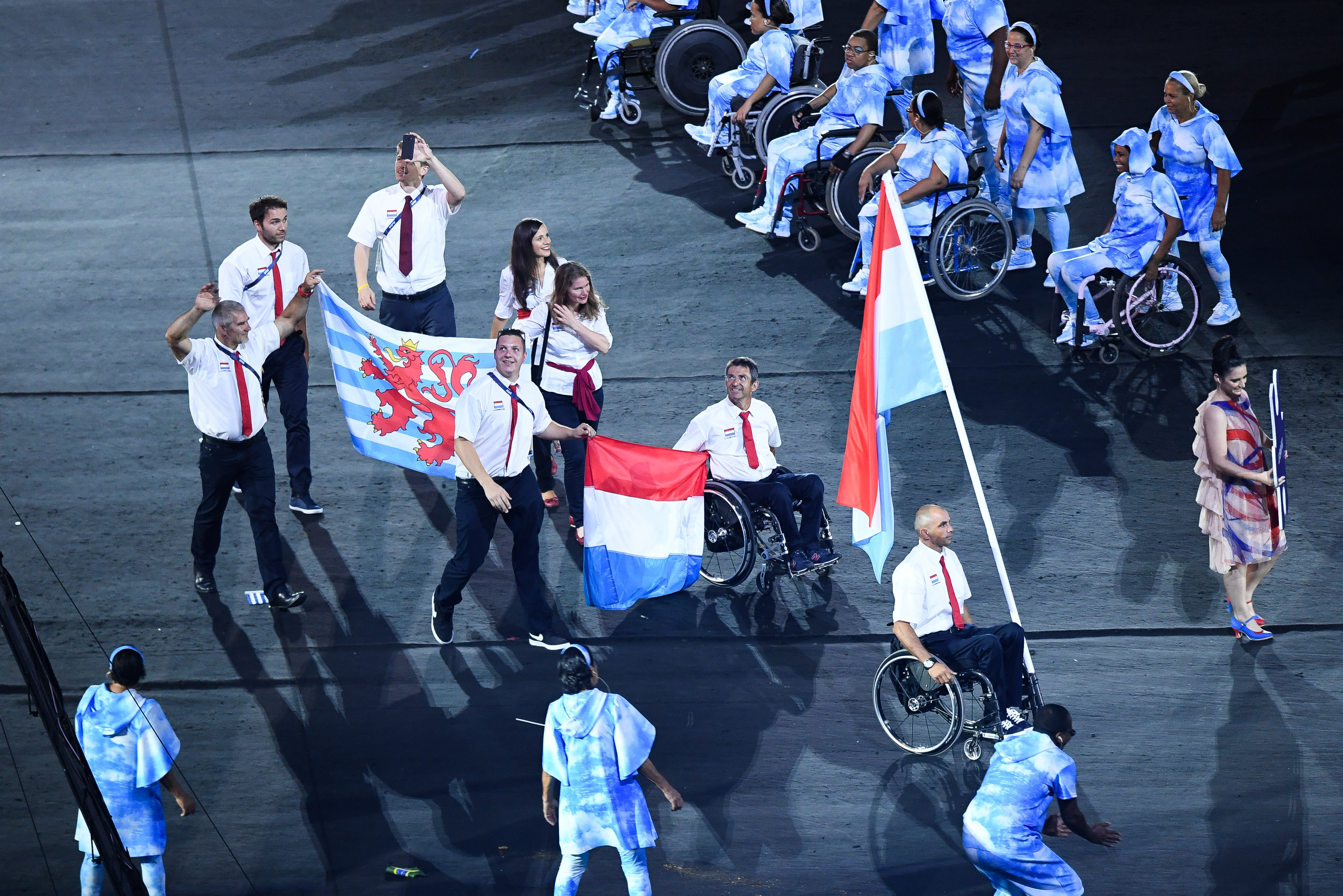
2016 Paralympics Parade of Nations, Luxembourg.

People with disability in Luxembourg have some legal protections from discrimination and their needs can be provided through various government policies. Students with disabilities have a fairly good rate of completing school compared to peers without a disability. Luxembourg signed onto the Convention on the Rights of Persons with Disabilities on 30 March 2007. Much of the country is accessible, however, there are no legal provisions for reasonable accommodations.

== Demographics ==
People with disabilities living in poverty in Luxembourg has increased since 2010. However, the rate of poverty was lower than in other European countries at 2 per cent in 2011.

In 2011, the unemployment rate for people with disabilities in the country was at 21 points. People with severe disabilities had a 39 per cent unemployment rate.

== Policy ==
Luxembourg has largely used a medical model of disability in its policies and legislation regarding people with disabilities.

Starting in 1989, the government decided to centralize agencies and policies for people with disabilities and put it together in the Ministry of Family Affairs, Integration and for the Greater Region. Luxembourg's 2012 national plan contained measures to improve the lives of people with disabilities.

Luxembourg's Employment Code specifies that businesses with more than 25 employees must hire a certain percentage of people with disabilities.

People with severe disabilities and children are able to access a disability allowance. The allowance for children, Allocation supplémentaire pour enfant handicapé, is provided when a child's mental or physical capacity is reduced by 50 percent. Adult residents of Luxembourg that are at least 30 percent disabled and unable to work can be recognized as a disabled worker and receive Revenu pour personne gravement handicapée. Individuals who require a caregiver can receive Assurance dépendance.

German Sign Language was recognized as an official language in May 2017.

=== Non-governmental organizations ===
Info-Handicap was created in April 1993 when 16 different disability organizations came together to work with the government. The organization grew to include 55 member groups over time.

=== Legislation ===
Luxembourg signed onto the Convention on the Rights of Persons with Disabilities on March 30, 2007. Law No. 169 on the rights of persons with disabilities was passed on July 28, 2011.

Under European Union directives, the country is prevented from firing a worker based on their disability status. The two relevant directives are 2000/43/EC and 2000/78/EC.

=== Education ===
In Luxembourg, students with a disability are generally slightly less likely to complete various levels of education than people without a disability.

Special education classes are also available for migrant children and children living in poverty who may have "language-related deprivations." Refugees also receive special education as needed.

== Accessibility ==
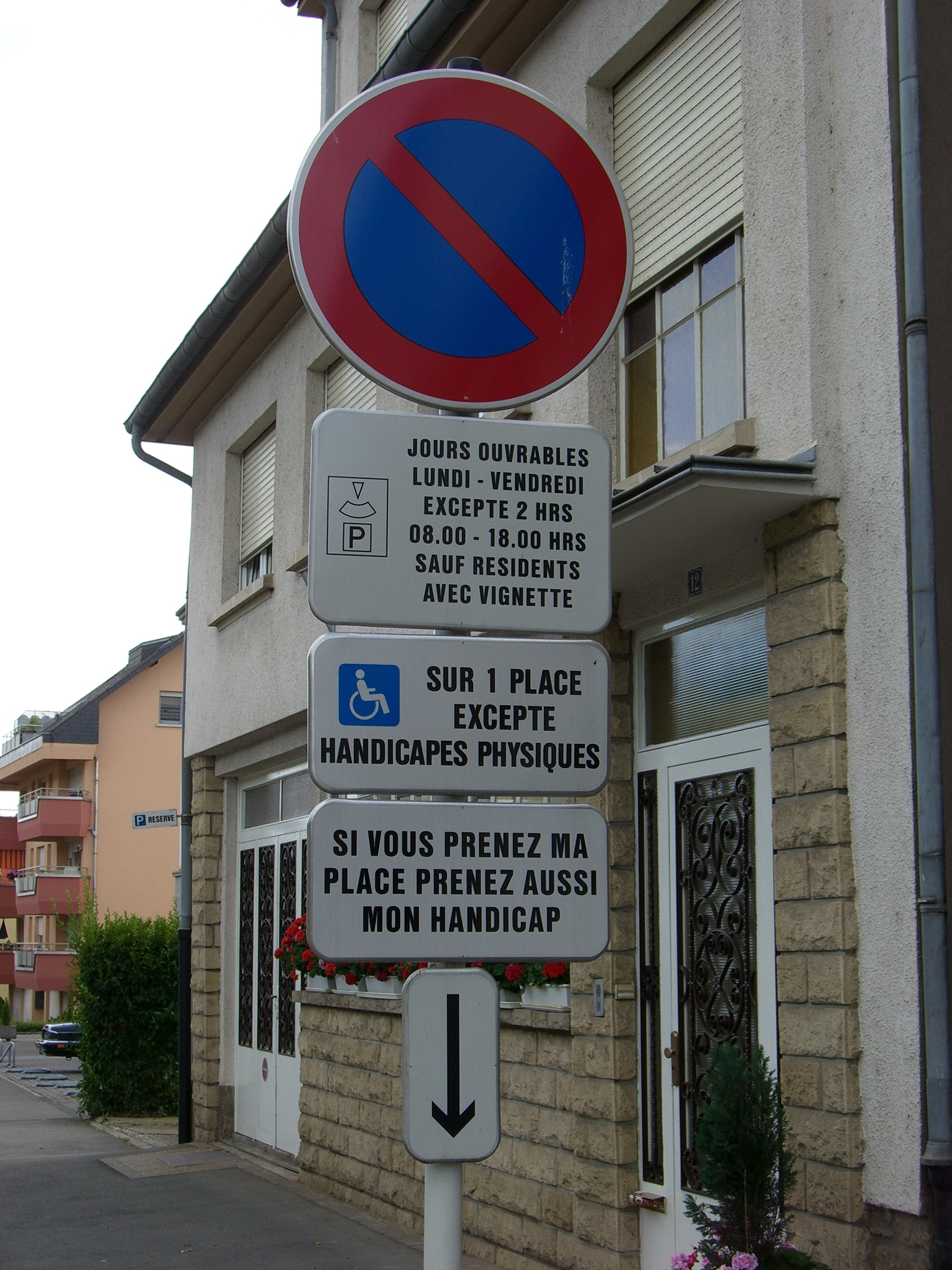
Seen in front of a house in Walferdange at a parking space for a disabled person (third plate from top): Si vous prenez ma place prenez aussi mon handicap: "When you take my parking spot, also take my disability."

As of 2017, there were no legal rights to reasonable accommodation in Luxembourg.

Rollibus, a door-to-door taxi bus, is available in the city of Luxembourg for individuals who use wheelchairs. Most city streets and rail stations are equipped for people with disabilities. Buses are also able to accommodate people with disabilities and guide dogs ride buses for free.

Parking spaces for people with disabilities are clearly marked and people using the spots must display their credentials with a European Union blue badge.

== Cultural attitudes ==
According to a 2019 report from the Centre for Equal Treatment (Centre pour l'égalité de traitement CET), the most common type of discrimination in the country is against people with disabilities. In 2019, it was found that 25 percent of discrimination cases were due to discrimination against people with disabilities. Large companies have been found to not keep up with the Employment Code which specifies that any business with more than 25 employees must hire a certain number of people with disabilities.
