= Luxembourg =

Country in Western Europe

Grand Duchy of Luxembourg: Groussherzogtum Lëtzebuerg (Luxembourgish); Grand-Duché de Luxembourg (French); Großherzogtum Luxemburg (German)
- Flag Coat of arms
- Motto: "Mir wëlle bleiwe wat mir sinn" "We want to stay what we are"
- Anthem: "Ons Heemecht" ("Our Homeland") Royal anthem: "De Wilhelmus"^{a}
- Location of Luxembourg (green circle) – in Europe (light green & dark grey) – in the European Union (light green) – [Legend]
- Capital and largest city: Luxembourg; 49°36′41″N 6°07′48″E
- Official languages: National language: Luxembourgish; Administrative languages: Luxembourgish; German; French
- Ethnic groups (2025): 53% Luxembourgers; 13.2% Portuguese^{e}; 7.2% French^{e}; 3.7% Italians^{e}; 23% other^{e}
- Religion (2021): 53% Christianity; 46% Catholicism; 7% other Christian; 38% no religion; 9% other
- Demonyms: Luxembourger; Luxembourgish
- Government: Unitary parliamentary constitutional monarchy
  - Grand Duke: Guillaume V
  - Prime Minister: Luc Frieden
  - President of the Chamber of Deputies: Claude Wiseler
- Legislature: Chamber of Deputies

Establishment history
  - County of Luxembourg: 963
  - Duchy of Luxembourg: 1353
  - Elevated to Grand Duchy: 1815
  - Independence from the German Confederation: 19 April 1839
  - End of personal union with the Netherlands: 23 November 1890
  - Liberation from Nazi Germany: 25 January 1945

Area
  - Total: 2,586.4 km^{2} (998.6 sq mi) (168th)
  - Water (%): 0.23 (2015)

Population
  - September 2026 estimate: ▲696,268 (163rd)
  - 2021 census: 643,941
  - Density: 268.3/km^{2} (694.9/sq mi) (55th)
- GDP (PPP): 2026 estimate
  - Total: ▲$108.959 billion (100th)
  - Per capita: ▲$156,638 (1st)
- GDP (nominal): 2026 estimate
  - Total: ▲$108.330 billion (73rd)
  - Per capita: ▲$155,733 (1st)
- Gini (2023): ▲30.6 medium inequality
- HDI (2023): 0.922 very high (25th)
- Currency: Euro (€) (EUR)
- Time zone: UTC+1 (CET)
  - Summer (DST): UTC+2 (CEST)
- Calling code: +352
- ISO 3166 code: LU
- Internet TLD: .lu^{b}
- 1. Not the same as Het Wilhelmus of the Netherlands; 2. The .eu domain is also used, as it is shared with other European Union member states.; 5. These figures are likely an underestimation, as dual citizens with Luxembourgish nationality are counted solely as Luxembourgers in official estimates.

Luxembourg, (Note: /ˈlʌksəmbɜːrɡ/ LUK-səm-burg; Luxembourgish: Lëtzebuerg [ˈlətsəbu̯əɕ]; German: Luxemburg [ˈlʊksm̩bʊʁk]; French: Luxembourg [lyksɑ̃buʁ]) officially the Grand Duchy of Luxembourg, (Note: Luxembourgish: Groussherzogtum Lëtzebuerg [ˈɡʀəʊ̯sˌhɛχtsoːχtum ˈlətsəbu̯əɕ]; French: Grand-Duché de Luxembourg [ɡʁɑ̃ dyʃe də lyksɑ̃buʁ]; German: Großherzogtum Luxemburg [ˈɡʁoːsˌhɛʁtsoːktuːm ˈlʊksm̩bʊʁk].) is a landlocked country in Western Europe. It is bordered by Belgium to the west and north, Germany to the east, and France to the south. Its capital and most populous city, Luxembourg City, is one of the four institutional seats of the European Union (Note: Together with Brussels, Frankfurt, and Strasbourg.) and hosts several EU institutions, notably the Court of Justice of the European Union, the highest judicial authority in the EU.

As part of the Low Countries, Luxembourg has close historic, political, and cultural ties to Belgium and the Netherlands. Luxembourg's culture, people, and languages are greatly influenced by France and Germany: Luxembourgish, a Germanic language, is the only recognised national language of the Luxembourgish people and of the Grand Duchy of Luxembourg; French is the sole language for legislation; and both languages, along with German, are used for administrative matters.

With an area of 2,586 square kilometres (998 sq mi), Luxembourg is Europe's seventh-smallest country. In 2026, it had a population of 696,268, which makes it one of the least-populated countries in Europe, albeit with the highest population growth rate; foreign nationals account for almost half the population. Luxembourg is a representative democracy headed by a constitutional monarch, Grand Duke Guillaume V, making it the world's only remaining sovereign grand duchy.

The County of Luxembourg was established in the year 963 as a state within the Holy Roman Empire. Its succession of rulers culminated when Henry VII became the Holy Roman Emperor in 1312. Luxembourg came under Habsburg rule in the 15th century, and was then annexed by France in the 18th century. Luxembourg was partitioned three times, reducing its size. Having been restored in 1815 after the defeat of Napoleon, it regained independence in 1867 after the Luxembourg Crisis.

Luxembourg is a developed country with an advanced economy and one of the world's highest PPP-adjusted GDPs per capita, per the IMF and World Bank. It also ranks highly in terms of life expectancy, human development, and human rights. The historic city of Luxembourg was declared a UNESCO World Heritage Site in 1994 due to the exceptional preservation of its vast fortifications and historic quarters. Luxembourg is a founding member of the European Union, OECD, the United Nations, NATO, and the Benelux. It served on the United Nations Security Council for the first time in 2013 and 2014.

== History ==
=== Before AD 963 ===
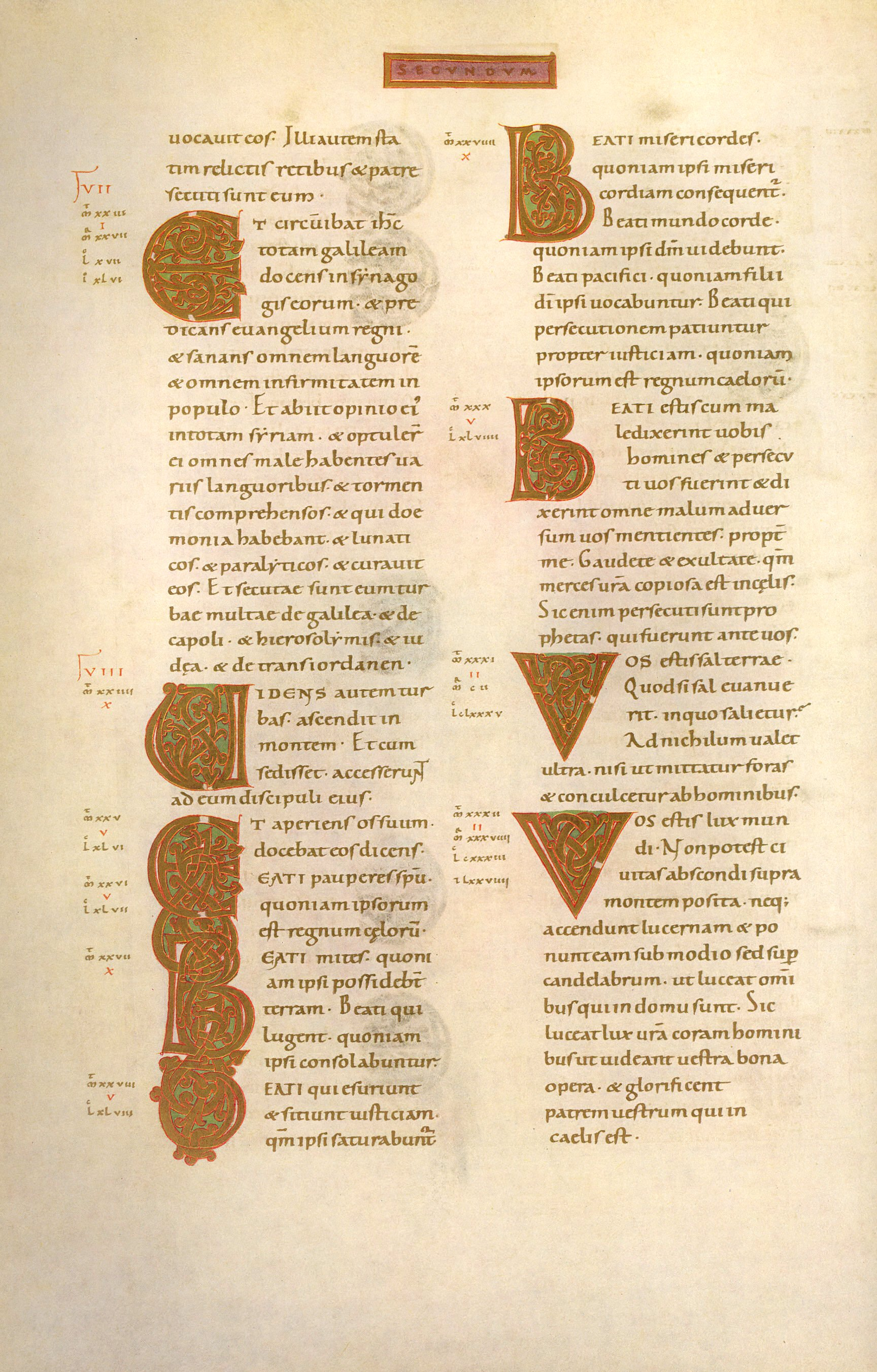
Text page from the Codex Aureus of Echternach, an important surviving codex, was produced in the Abbey of Echternach in the 11th century.

The first traces of settlement in what is now Luxembourg are dated back to the Palaeolithic Age, about 35,000 years ago. From the 6th century BC, Celtic tribes settled in the region between the rivers Rhine and Meuse.

Six centuries later, the Romans named the Celtic tribes inhabiting these exact regions collectively as the Treveri. Many examples of archaeological evidence proving their existence in Luxembourg have been discovered, the most famous being the Oppidum of Titelberg.

In around 58 to 51 BC, the Romans invaded the country when Julius Caesar conquered Gaul and part of Germania up to the Rhine border, thus the area of what is now Luxembourg became part of the Roman Empire for the next 450 years, living in relative peace under the Pax Romana.

Similar to those in Gaul, the Celts of Luxembourg adopted Roman culture, language, morals and a way of life, effectively becoming what historians later described as Gallo-Roman civilization. Evidence from that period includes the Dalheim Ricciacum and the Vichten mosaic, on display at the National Museum of History and Art in Luxembourg City.

The territory was infiltrated by the Germanic Franks from the 4th century, and was abandoned by Rome in AD 406, after which it became part of the Kingdom of the Franks. The Salian Franks who settled in the area are often described as the ones having brought the Germanic language to present-day Luxembourg, since the old Frankish language spoken by them is considered by linguists to be a direct forerunner of the Moselle Franconian dialect, which later evolved into, among others, the modern-day Luxembourgish language.

The Christianization of Luxembourg is usually dated back to the end of the 7th century. The most famous figure in this context is Willibrord, a Northumbrian missionary saint, who together with other monks established the Abbey of Echternach in AD 698, and is celebrated annually in the dancing procession of Echternach.

=== Emergence and expansion (963–1312) ===
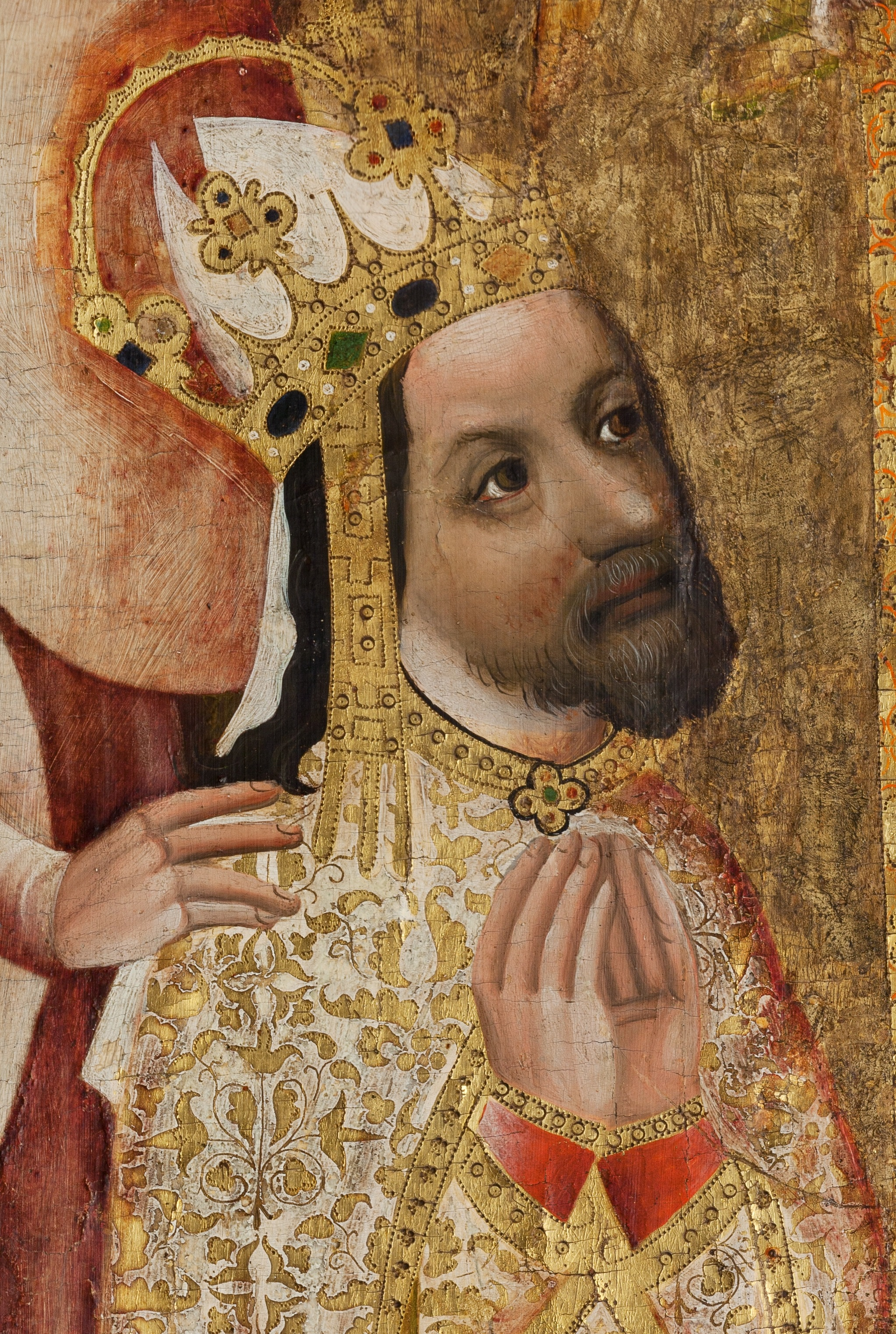
Charles IV, the 14th-century Holy Roman Emperor and King of Bohemia from the House of Luxembourg

When the Carolingian Empire was divided many times starting with the Treaty of Verdun in 843, today's Luxembourgish territory became successively part of the Kingdom of Middle Francia (843–855), the Kingdom of Lotharingia (855–959) and finally of the Duchy of Lorraine (959–1059), which itself had become a state of the Holy Roman Empire.

The recorded history of Luxembourg begins with the acquisition of Lucilinburhuc (today Luxembourg Castle) situated on the Bock rock by Siegfried, Count of the Ardennes, in 963 through an exchange act with St. Maximin's Abbey, Trier. Around this fort, a town gradually developed, which became the centre of a state of great strategic value within the Duchy of Lorraine. Over the years, the fortress was extended by Siegfried's descendants and by 1083, one of them, Conrad I, was the first to call himself a "Count of Luxembourg", and with it effectively creating the independent County of Luxembourg (which was still a state within the Holy Roman Empire).

By the middle of the 13th century, the counts of Luxembourg had managed to gain considerable wealth and power and had expanded their territory from the river Meuse to the Moselle. By the time of the reign of Henry V the Blonde, Bitburg, La Roche-en-Ardenne, Durbuy, Arlon, Thionville, Marville, Longwy, and in 1264 the competing County of Vianden (and with it St Vith and Schleiden) had either been incorporated directly or become vassal states to the County of Luxembourg. The only major setback during their rise in power came in 1288, when Henry VI and his three brothers died at the Battle of Worringen while trying unsuccessfully to add the Duchy of Limburg to their realm. But despite the defeat, the Battle of Worringen helped the Counts of Luxembourg to achieve military glory, which they had previously lacked, as they had mostly enlarged their territory by means of inheritances, marriages and fiefdoms.

The ascension of the Counts of Luxembourg culminated when Henry VII became King of the Romans, King of Italy and finally, in 1312, Holy Roman Emperor.

=== Golden Age (1312–1443) ===
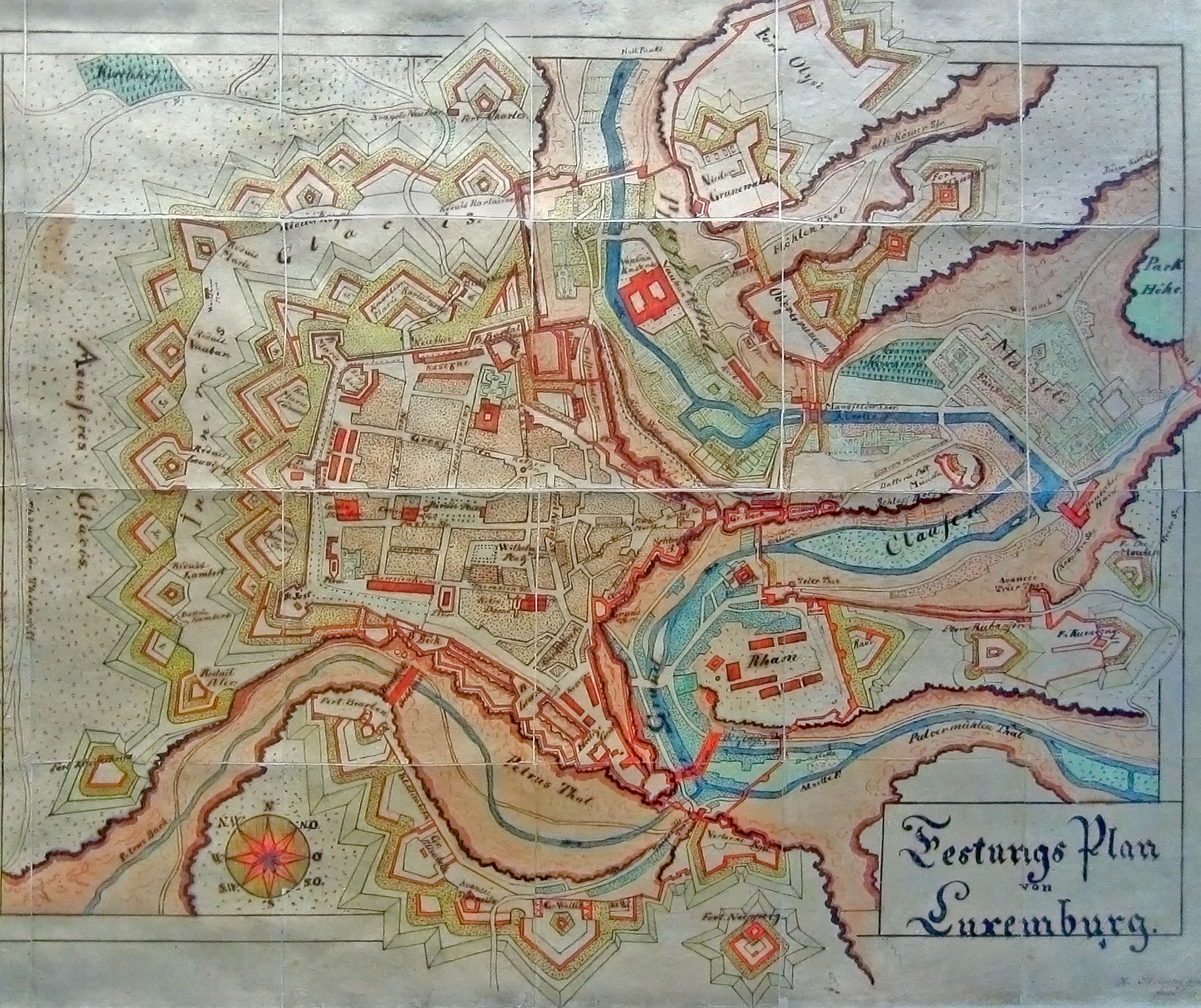
Historic map (undated) of Luxembourg City's fortifications

With the ascension of Henry VII as Emperor, the dynasty of the House of Luxembourg not only began to rule the Holy Roman Empire, but rapidly began to exercise growing influence over other parts of Central Europe as well.

Henry's son, John the Blind, in addition to being Count of Luxembourg, also became King of Bohemia. He remains a major figure in Luxembourgish history and folklore and is considered by many historians the epitome of chivalry in mediaeval times. He is also known for having founded the Schueberfouer in 1340 and for his heroic death at the Battle of Crécy in 1346. John the Blind is considered a national hero in Luxembourg.

In the 14th and early 15th centuries, three more members of the House of Luxembourg reigned as Holy Roman Emperors and Bohemian Kings: John's descendants Charles IV, Sigismund (who also was King of Hungary and Croatia), and Wenceslaus IV. Charles IV created the long-lasting Golden Bull of 1356, a decree which fixed important aspects of the constitutional structure of the Empire. Luxembourg remained an independent fief (county) of the Holy Roman Empire, and in 1354, Charles IV elevated it to the status of a duchy with his half-brother Wenceslaus I becoming the first Duke of Luxembourg. While his kin were occupied ruling and expanding their power within the Holy Roman Empire and elsewhere, Wenceslaus, annexed the County of Chiny in 1364, and with it, the territories of the new Duchy of Luxembourg reached its greatest extent.

During these 130 years, the House of Luxembourg was contending with the House of Habsburg for supremacy within the Holy Roman Empire and Central Europe. It all came to end in 1443, when the House of Luxembourg suffered a succession crisis, precipitated by the lack of a male heir to assume the throne. Since Sigismund and Elizabeth of Görlitz were both heirless, all possessions of the Luxembourg Dynasty were redistributed among the European aristocracy. The Duchy of Luxembourg become a possession of Philip the Good, Duke of Burgundy.

As the House of Luxembourg had become extinct and Luxembourg now became part of the Burgundian Netherlands, this would mark the start of nearly 400 years of foreign rule over Luxembourg.

=== Habsburg rule and French invasions (1444–1794) ===
In 1482, Philip the Handsome inherited all of what became then known as the Habsburg Netherlands, and with it the Duchy of Luxembourg. For nearly 320 years Luxembourg would remain a possession of the mighty House of Habsburg, at first under Austrian rule (1506–1556), then under Spanish rule (1556–1714), before going back again to Austrian rule (1714–1794).
With having become a Habsburg possession, the Duchy of Luxembourg became, like many countries in Europe at the time, heavily involved in the many conflicts for dominance of Europe between the Habsburg-held countries and the Kingdom of France.

In 1542, the King of France, François I, invaded Luxembourg twice, but the Habsburgs under Charles V managed to reconquer the Duchy each time.

Luxembourg became part of the Spanish Netherlands in 1556, and when France and Spain went to war in 1635 it resulted in the Treaty of the Pyrenees, in which the first partition of Luxembourg was decided. Under the Treaty, Spain ceded the Luxembourgish fortresses of Stenay, Thionville, and Montmédy, and the surrounding territory to France, effectively reducing the size of Luxembourg for the first time in centuries.

In context of the Nine Years' War in 1684, France invaded Luxembourg again, conquering and occupying the Duchy until 1697 when it was returned to the Spanish to garner support for the Bourbon cause during the prelude to the War of the Spanish Succession. When the war broke out in 1701 Luxembourg and the Spanish Netherlands were administered by the pro-French faction under the governor Maximilian II Emanuel, Elector of Bavaria and sided with the Bourbons. The duchy was subsequently occupied by the pro-Austrian allied forces during the conflict and was awarded to Austria at its conclusion in 1714.

As the Duchy of Luxembourg repeatedly passed back and forth from Spanish and Austrian to French rule, each of the conquering nations contributed to strengthening and expanding the Fortress that the Castle of Luxembourg had become over the years. One example of this includes French military engineer Marquis de Vauban who advanced the fortifications around and on the heights of the city, fortification walls that are still visible today.

=== French rule (1794–1815) ===
During the War of the First Coalition, Revolutionary France invaded the Austrian Netherlands, and with it, Luxembourg. In the years 1793 and 1794 most of the Duchy was conquered relatively quickly and the French Revolutionary Army committed many atrocities and pillages against the Luxembourgish civilian population and abbeys, the most infamous being the massacres of Differdange and Dudelange, as well as the destruction of the abbeys of Clairefontaine, Echternach and Orval. However the Fortress of Luxembourg resisted for nearly 7 months before the Austrian forces holding it surrendered. Luxembourg's long defence led Lazare Carnot to call Luxembourg "the best fortress in the world, except Gibraltar", giving rise to the city's nickname the Gibraltar of the North.

Luxembourg was annexed by France, becoming the département des forêts (department of forests), and the incorporation of the former Duchy as a département into France was formalised at the Treaty of Campo Formio in 1797. From the start of the occupation the new French officials in Luxembourg, who spoke only French, implemented many republican reforms, among them the principle of laicism, which led to an outcry in strongly Catholic Luxembourg. Additionally French was implemented as the only official language and Luxembourgish people were barred access to all civil services. When the French Army introduced military duty for the local population, riots broke out which culminated in 1798 when Luxembourgish peasants started a rebellion. Even though the French managed to rapidly suppress this revolt called Klëppelkrich, it had a profound effect on the historical memory of the country and its citizens.

However, many republican ideas of this era continue to have a lasting effect on Luxembourg; one of the many examples features the implementation of the Napoleonic Code Civil which was introduced in 1804 and is still valid today.

=== National awakening (1815–1890) ===
After the defeat of Napoleon in 1815, the Congress of Vienna decided to restore the Duchy of Luxembourg. However, as the territory had been part of the Holy Roman Empire as well as the Habsburgian Netherlands in the past, both the Kingdom of Prussia and the newly formed United Kingdom of the Netherlands, which included both the present Kingdom of the Netherlands and Belgium, now claimed possession of the territory. Thus the great powers decided that Luxembourg would become a member state of the newly formed German Confederation, but at the same time would be joined with the Netherlands in personal union under King William I of the Netherlands, the son of the last Stadtholder of the Dutch Republic, William V, Prince of Orange. To satisfy Prussia, it was decided that not only would the Fortress of Luxembourg be manned by Prussian troops, but also that large parts of Luxembourgish territory (mainly the areas around Bitburg and St. Vith) would become Prussian possessions. This marked the second time that the Duchy of Luxembourg was reduced in size and is generally known as the Second Partition of Luxembourg. To compensate the Duchy for this loss, it was decided to elevate the Duchy to a Grand Duchy, thus giving the Dutch monarchs the additional title of Grand Duke of Luxembourg. However, from 1816 to 1830, William I ignored the Duchy's sovereignty, treating Luxembourg as a conquered nation while subjecting Luxembourg to high taxes.

After Belgium became an independent country following the victorious Belgian Revolution of 1830–1831, it claimed the entire Grand-Duchy of Luxembourg as part of Belgium. However, neither the Dutch King, who was also Grand Duke of Luxembourg, nor Prussia wanted to lose their grip on the mighty fortress of Luxembourg. So, they did not agree with the Belgian claims. The dispute would be resolved at the 1839 Treaty of London, where the Third Partition of Luxembourg was decided. This time the territory was reduced by more than half, as the predominantly francophone western part of the country (but also the then Luxembourgish-speaking part of Arelerland) was transferred to the new Kingdom of Belgium under Leopold I of Belgium, thereby giving Luxembourg its modern-day borders. The treaty of 1839 also established full independence of the remaining Germanic-speaking Grand-Duchy of Luxembourg.

In 1842, Luxembourg joined the German Customs Union (Zollverein). This resulted in the opening of the German market, the development of Luxembourg's steel industry, and expansion of Luxembourg's railway network from 1855 to 1875.

After the Luxembourg Crisis of 1866 nearly led to war between Prussia and France, as both were unwilling to see the other taking influence over Luxembourg and its mighty fortress, the Grand Duchy's independence and neutrality were reaffirmed by the Second Treaty of London and Prussia was finally willing to withdraw its troops from the Fortress of Luxembourg under the condition that the fortifications would be dismantled. That happened the same year. At the time of the Franco-Prussian war in 1870, Luxembourg's neutrality was respected, and neither France nor Germany invaded the country.

As a result of the recurring disputes between the major European powers, the people of Luxembourg gradually developed a consciousness of independence and a national awakening took place in the 19th century. The people of Luxembourg began referring to themselves as Luxembourgers, rather than being part of one of the larger surrounding nations. This consciousness of Mir wëlle bleiwe wat mir sinn ("We want to remain what we are") culminated in 1890, when the last step towards full independence was finally taken: due to a succession crisis the Dutch monarchy ceased to hold the title Grand-Duke of Luxembourg. Beginning with Adolph of Nassau-Weilburg, the Grand-Duchy would have its own monarchy, thus reaffirming its full independence.

=== German occupations and interwar political crisis (1890–1945) ===
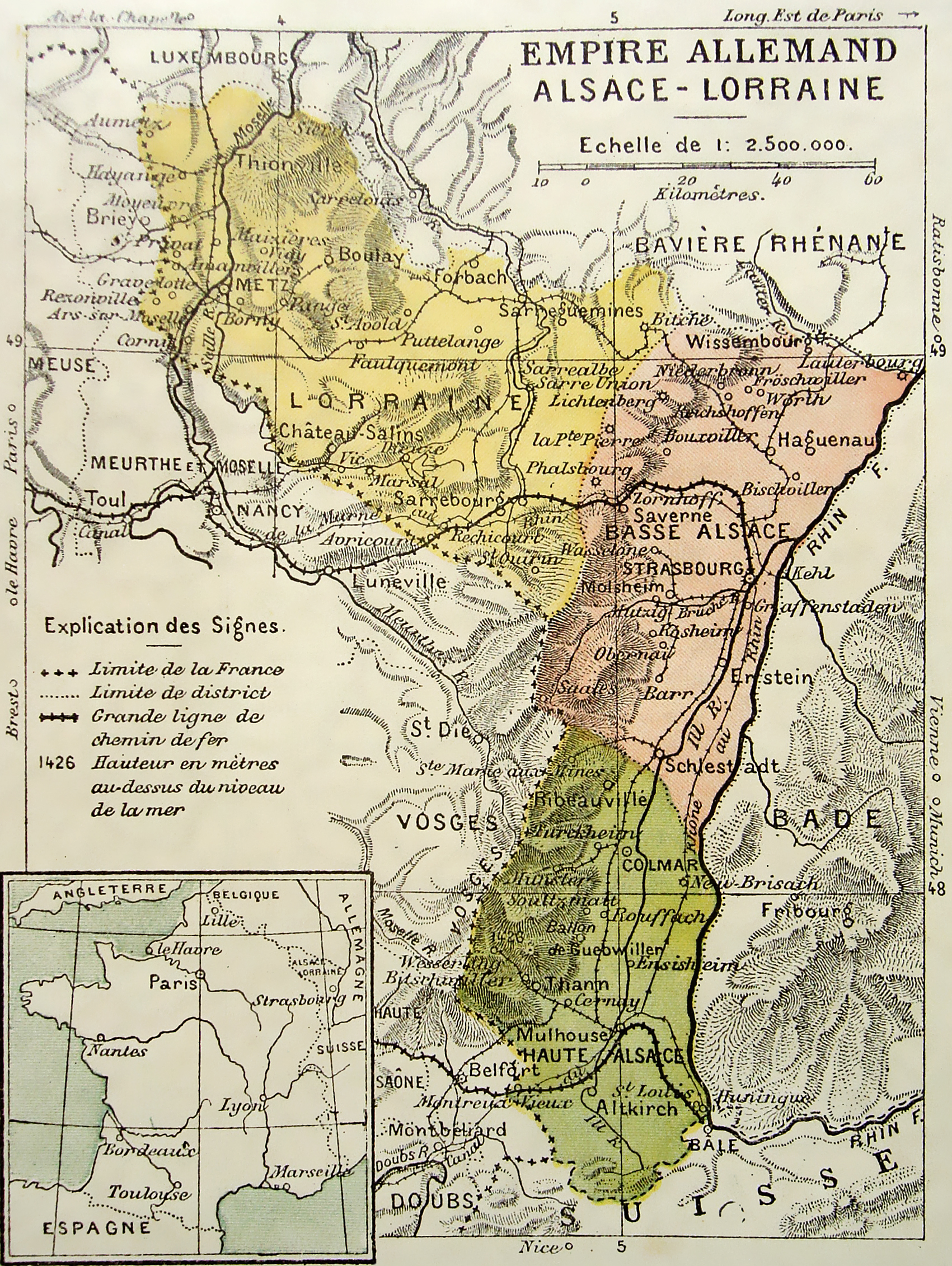
Frontier with Alsace-Lorraine from 1871 to 1918

In August 1914, during World War I, Imperial Germany violated Luxembourg's neutrality by invading it to defeat France. Nevertheless, despite the German occupation, Luxembourg was allowed to maintain much of its independence and political mechanisms. Unaware of the fact that Germany secretly planned to annex the Grand-Duchy in case of a German victory (the Septemberprogramm), the Luxembourgish government continued to pursue a policy of strict neutrality. However, the Luxembourgish population did not believe Germany had good intentions, fearing that it would annex Luxembourg. Around 1,000 Luxembourgers served in the French army; their sacrifices have been commemorated at the Gëlle Fra.

After the war, Grand-Duchess Marie-Adélaïde was seen by many people (including the French and Belgian governments) as having collaborated with the Germans and calls for her abdication and the establishment of a Republic became louder. After the retreat of the German army, communists in Luxembourg City and Esch-sur-Alzette tried to establish a soviet worker's republic similar to the ones emerging in Germany, but these attempts lasted only two days.

In November 1918, a motion in the Chamber of Deputies demanding the abolition of the monarchy was defeated narrowly by 21 votes to 19 (with three abstentions).

France questioned the Luxembourgish government's, and especially Marie-Adélaïde's, neutrality during the war, and calls for an annexation of Luxembourg to either France or Belgium grew louder in both countries. In January 1919, a company of the Luxembourgish Army rebelled, declaring itself to be the army of the new republic, but French troops intervened and put an end to the rebellion. Nonetheless, the disloyalty shown by her own armed forces was too much for Marie-Adélaïde, who abdicated in favour of her sister Charlotte 5 days later. The same year, in a popular referendum, 77.8% of the Luxembourgish population declared in favour of maintaining monarchy and rejected the establishment of a republic. During this time, Belgium pushed for an annexation of Luxembourg. However, all such claims were ultimately dismissed at the Paris Peace Conference, thus securing Luxembourg's independence.

In 1939, the Luxembourg army increased to 425 due to Nazi Germany presence. On 9 May 1940 Luxembourg closed the defensive Schuster Line with Germany; one day later, Luxembourg's neutrality was violated again when Nazi Germany's Wehrmacht entered the country "entirely without justification". In contrast to the First World War, under the German occupation of Luxembourg during World War II, the country was treated as German territory and informally annexed to the adjacent province of Nazi Germany, Gau Moselland. This time, Luxembourg did not remain neutral as Luxembourg's government in exile based in London supported the Allies, sending a small group of volunteers who participated in the Normandy invasion, and multiple resistance groups formed inside the occupied country.

With 2.45% of its prewar population killed, and a third of all buildings in Luxembourg being destroyed or heavily damaged (mainly due to the Battle of the Bulge), Luxembourg suffered the highest such loss in Western Europe, but its commitment to the Allied war effort was never questioned. Around 1,000–2,500 of Luxembourg's Jews were murdered in the Holocaust.

=== Integration into NATO and European Union (1945–present) ===
The Grand Duchy became a founding member of the United Nations in 1945. Luxembourg's neutral status under the constitution formally ended in 1948, and in April 1949 it also became a founding member of NATO. During the Cold War, Luxembourg continued its involvements on the side of the Western Bloc. In the early fifties a small contingent of troops fought in the Korean War. Luxembourg troops have also deployed to Afghanistan, to support ISAF.

In the 1950s, Luxembourg became one of the six founding countries of the European Communities, following the 1952 establishment of the European Coal and Steel Community, and subsequent 1958 creations of the European Economic Community and European Atomic Energy Community. In 1993, the former two of these were incorporated into the European Union. With Robert Schuman (one of the founding fathers of the EU), Pierre Werner (considered the father of the Euro), Gaston Thorn, Jacques Santer and Jean-Claude Juncker (all former presidents of the European Commission), Luxembourgish politicians contributed substantially to the EU's formation and establishment. In 1999, Luxembourg joined the eurozone. Thereafter, the country was elected non-permanent member of the United Nations Security Council (2013–14).

The steel industry exploiting the Red Lands' rich iron-ore grounds in the beginning of the 20th century drove Luxembourg's industrialization. After the decline of the steel industry in the 1970s, the country focused on establishing itself as a global financial centre and developed into a banking hub. Since the beginning of the 21st century, its governments have focused on developing the country into a knowledge economy, with the founding of the University of Luxembourg and a national space programme. In 2020, Luxembourg became the first country in the world to provide free public transport at a national scale.

On 19 December 2023, Luxembourg's Chamber of Deputies adopted a law to modernize the current investment tax credit. It took effect less than two weeks later on 1 January 2024.

== Geography ==
Luxembourg is one of Europe's smallest countries, ranking 168th in size of the 194 independent countries of the world; it is about 2,586 square kilometres (998 sq mi) in size, measuring at most 82 km (51 mi) from north to south and 57 km (35 mi) from west to east. It lies between latitudes 49° and 51° N, and longitudes 5° and 7° E.

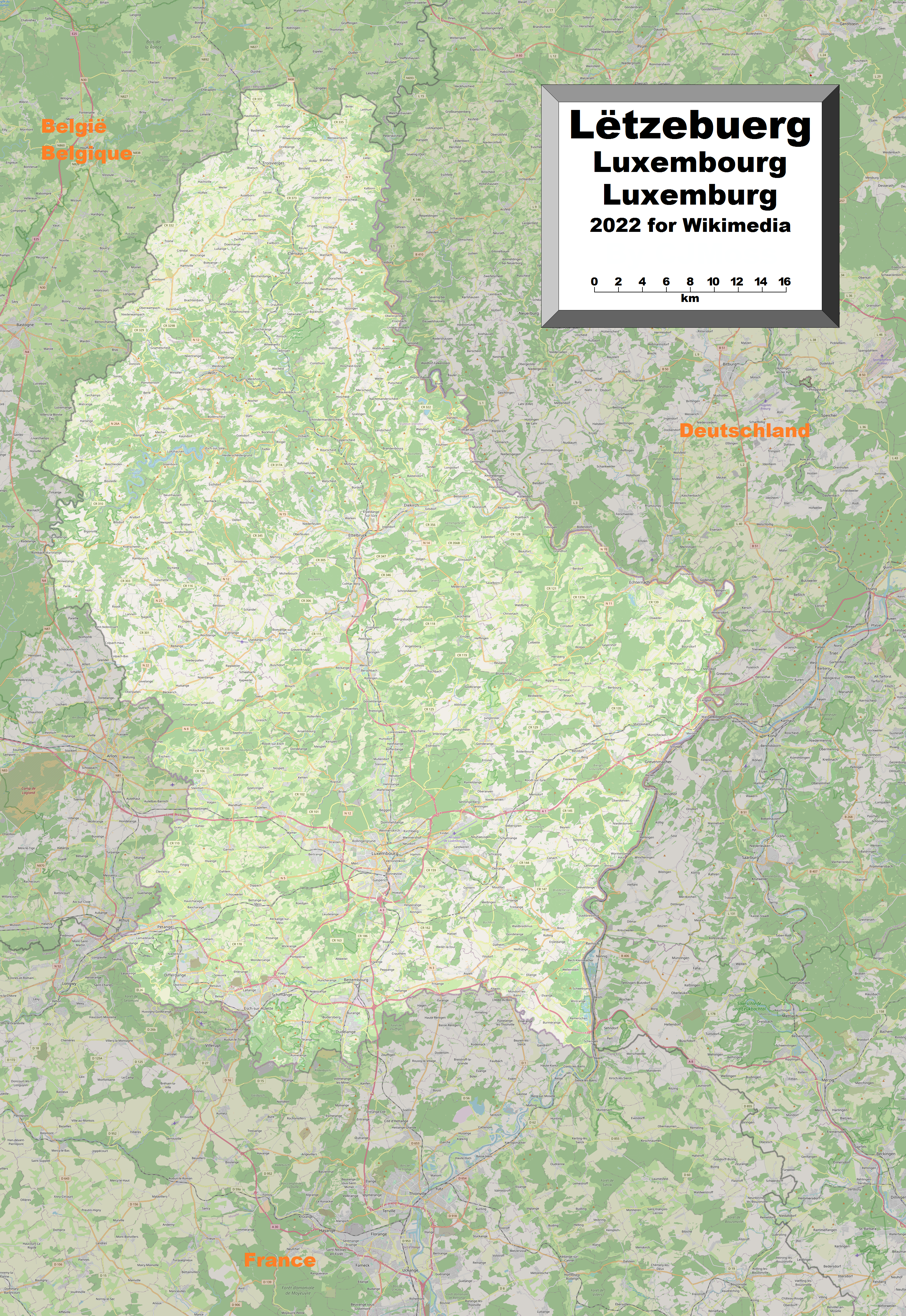
The largest cities are Luxembourg, Esch-sur-Alzette, Dudelange, and Differdange.

To the east, Luxembourg borders the German states of Rhineland-Palatinate and Saarland, and to the south, it borders the French departments of Moselle and Meurthe-et-Moselle in the Grand Est region. The Grand Duchy borders Belgium's Wallonia, in particular the provinces of Luxembourg and Liège, part of which comprises the German-speaking Community of Belgium, to the west and to the north, respectively.

The northern third of the country is known as the Éislek or Oesling, and forms part of the Ardennes. It is dominated by hills and low mountains, including the Kneiff near Wilwerdange, which is the highest point, at 560 metres (1,840 ft). Other mountains are the Buurgplaatz at 559 metres (1,834 ft) near Huldange and the Napoléonsgaard at 554 metres (1,818 ft) near Rambrouch. The region is sparsely populated, with only one town (Wiltz) with a population of more than five thousand people.

The southern two-thirds of the country is called the Guttland, and is more densely populated than the Éislek. It is also more diverse and can be divided into five geographic sub-regions. The Luxembourg plateau, in south-central Luxembourg, is a large, flat, sandstone formation, and the site of the city of Luxembourg. Little Switzerland, in the east of Luxembourg, has craggy terrain and thick forests. The Moselle valley is the lowest-lying region, running along the southeastern border. The Red Lands, in the far south and southwest, are Luxembourg's industrial heartland and home to many of Luxembourg's largest towns.

The border between Luxembourg and Germany is formed almost entirely by three rivers: the Moselle, the Sauer, and the Our, which form a condominium between the two countries. Other major rivers are the Alzette, the Attert, the Clerve, and the Wiltz. The valles] of the mid-Sauer and Attert form the border between the Guttland and the Éislek.

=== Environment ===
According to the 2012 Environmental Performance Index, Luxembourg is one of the world's best performers in environmental protection, ranking fourth out of 132 assessed countries. In 2020, it ranked second out of 180 countries. Luxembourg also ranks sixth among the top ten most liveable cities in the world by Mercer's. The country wants to cut GHG emissions by 55% in 10 years and reach zero emissions by 2050. Luxembourg wants to increase its organic farming fivefold. It had a 2019 Forest Landscape Integrity Index mean score of 1.12/10, ranking it 164th globally out of 172 countries.

In 2024, Luxembourg is ranked 2nd in Environmental Performance Index globally.

=== Climate ===
Luxembourg has an oceanic climate (Köppen: Cfb), marked by high levels of precipitation, particularly in late summer. The summers are warm and winters cool.

== Government and politics ==
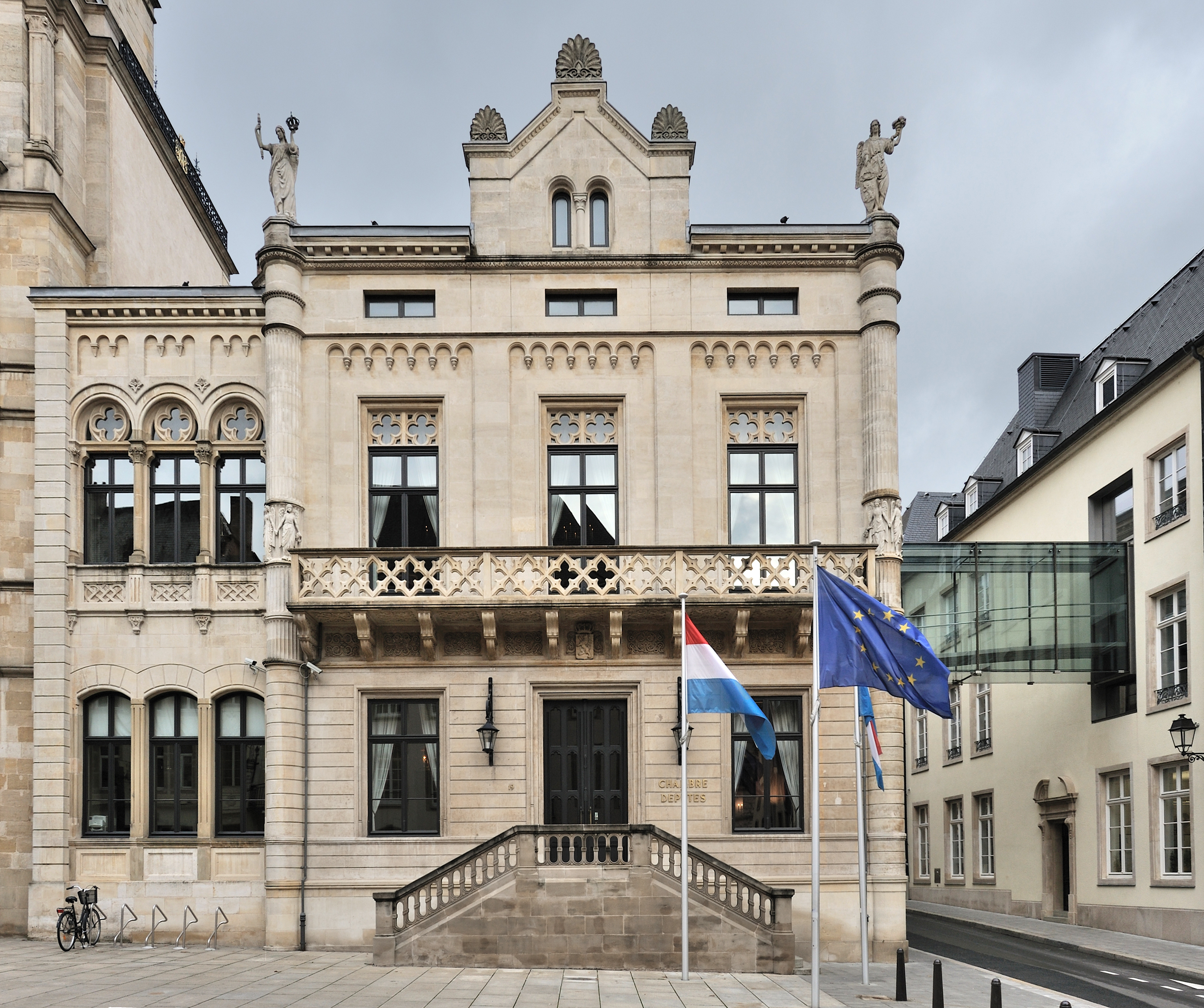
The Hall of the Chamber of Deputies, the meeting place of the Luxembourgish national legislature, the Chamber of Deputies, in Luxembourg City

Luxembourg is described as a "full democracy", with a parliamentary democracy headed by a constitutional monarch. Executive power is exercised by the grand duke and the cabinet, which consists of several members with the titles of minister, minister delegate or secretary of state, who are headed by a Prime Minister. The current Constitution of Luxembourg, the supreme law of Luxembourg, was originally adopted on 17 October 1868. The Constitution was last updated on 1 July 2023.

The grand duke has the power to dissolve the legislature, in which case new elections must be held within three months. But since 1919, sovereignty has resided with the nation, exercised by the grand duke in accordance with the Constitution and the law.

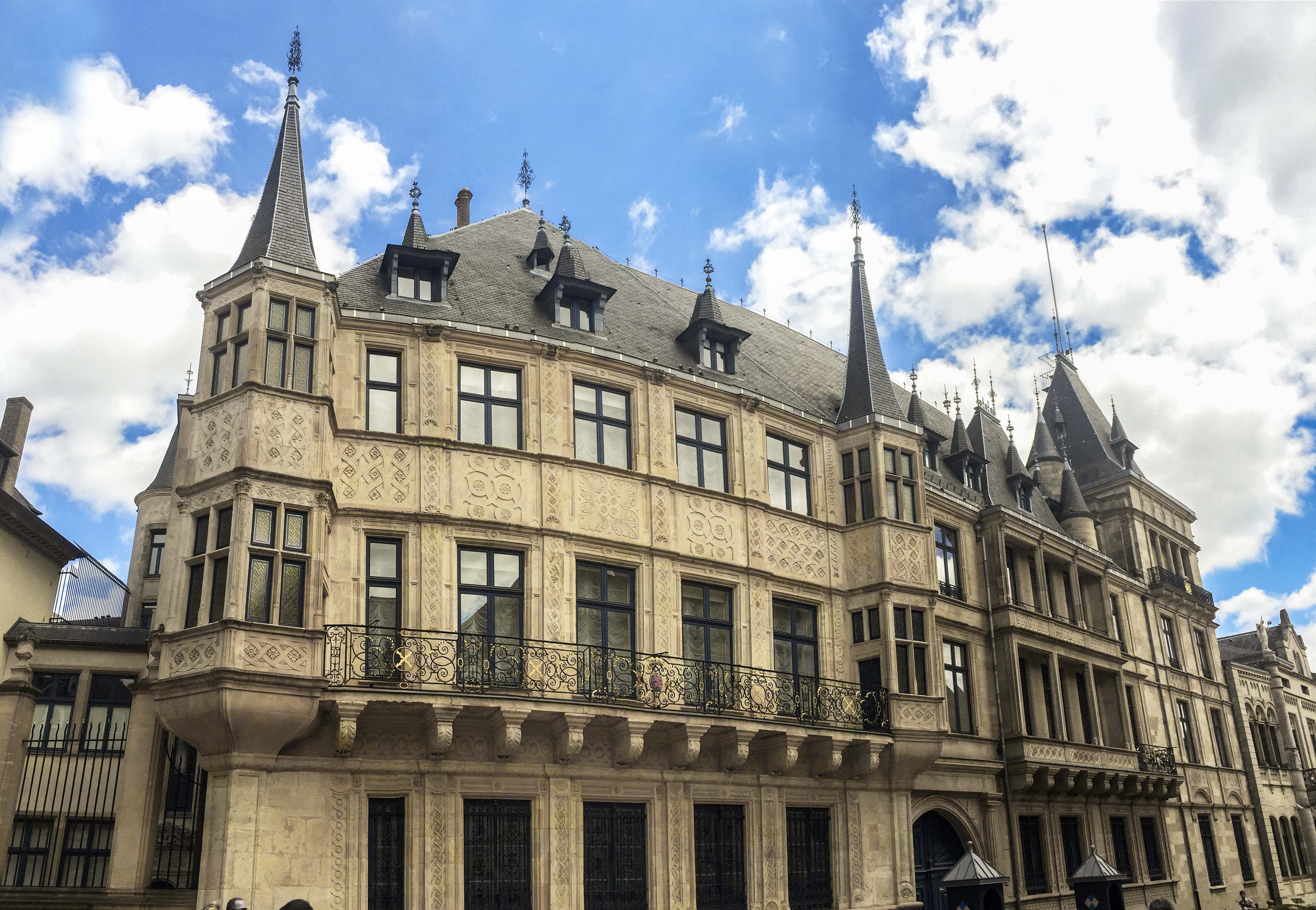
The Grand Ducal Palace in Luxembourg City, the official residence of the Grand Duke of Luxembourg

Legislative power is vested in the Chamber of Deputies, a unicameral legislature of sixty members, who are directly elected to five-year terms from four constituencies. A second body, the Council of State (Conseil d'État), composed of 21 members appointed by the grand duke, advises the Chamber of Deputies in the drafting of legislation.

Luxembourg has three lower tribunals (justices de paix; in Esch-sur-Alzette, the city of Luxembourg, and Diekirch), two district tribunals (Luxembourg and Diekirch), and a Superior Court of Justice (Luxembourg), which includes the Court of Appeal and the Court of Cassation. There is also an Administrative Tribunal and an Administrative Court, as well as a Constitutional Court, all of which are located in the capital.

According to International IDEA's Global State of Democracy (GSoD) Indices and Democracy Tracker, Luxembourg performs in the high range on overall democratic measures, with particular strengths in elected government, freedom of religion, and freedom of movement.

=== Administrative divisions ===
Luxembourg is divided into 12 cantons, which are further divided into 100 communes. Twelve of the communes have city status; the city of Luxembourg is the largest.

Cantons and communes of Luxembourg

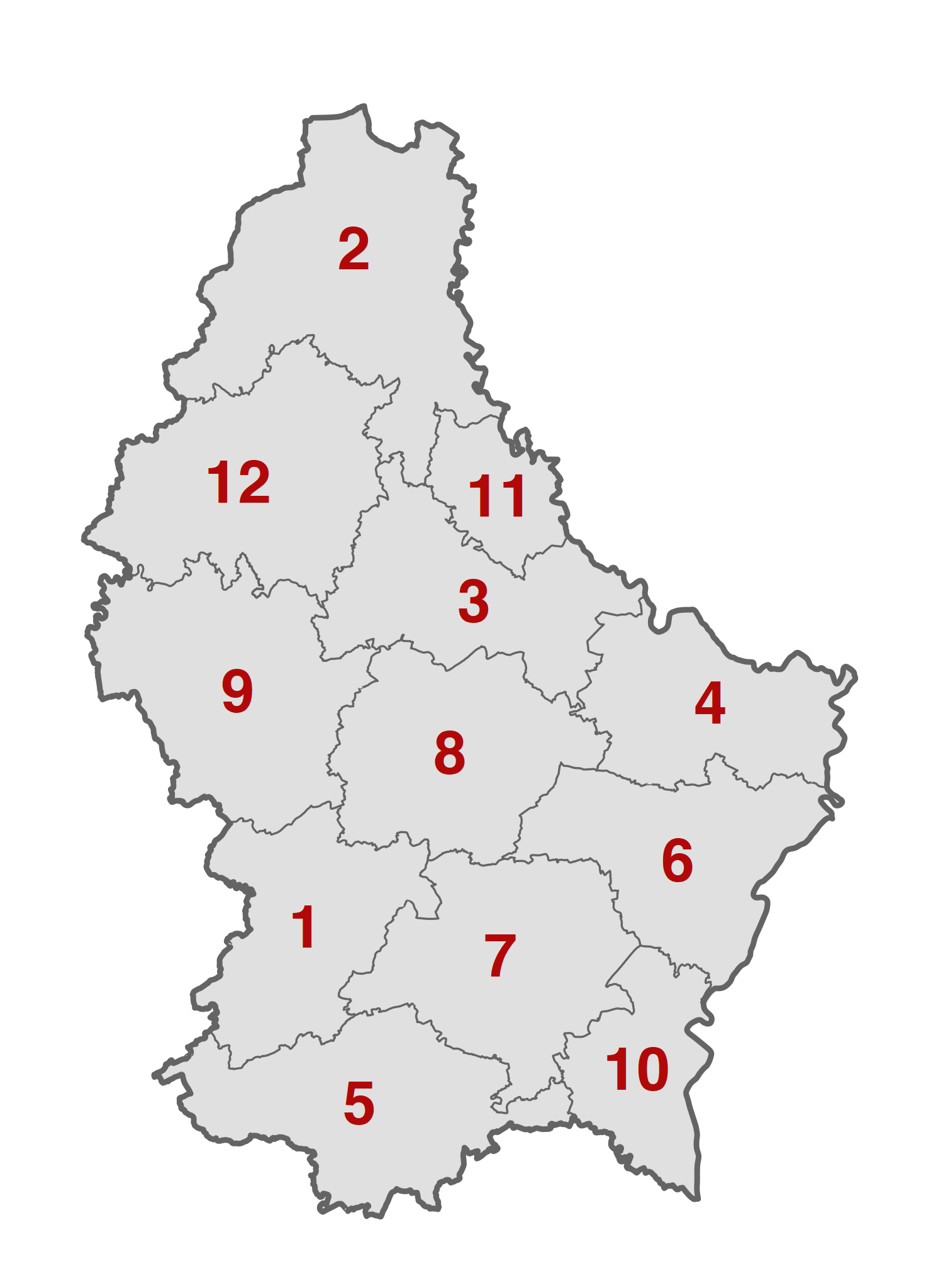
Cantons of Luxembourg:
Capellen (1) – Clervaux (2) – Diekirch (3) – Echternach (4) – Esch-sur-Alzette (5) – Grevenmacher (6) – Luxembourg (7) – Mersch (8) – Redange (9) – Remich (10) – Vianden (11) – Wiltz (12)

Communes of Luxembourg

=== Foreign relations ===
The Court of Justice of the European Union, seated in Luxembourg City

Luxembourg has long been a prominent supporter of European political and economic integration. In 1921, Luxembourg and Belgium formed the Belgium–Luxembourg Economic Union (BLEU) to create a regime of inter-exchangeable currency and a common customs. Luxembourg is a member of the Benelux Economic Union and was one of the founding members of the European Economic Community (now the European Union). It also participates in the Schengen Group (named after the Luxembourg village of Schengen where the agreements were signed). At the same time, the majority of Luxembourgers have consistently believed that European unity makes sense only in the context of a dynamic transatlantic relationship, and thus have traditionally pursued a pro-NATO, pro-US foreign policy.

Luxembourg is considered a European capital, and is the site of the Court of Justice of the European Union, the European Court of Auditors, the European Investment Bank, the Statistical Office of the European Union (Eurostat) and other vital EU organs. The Secretariat of the European Parliament is located in Luxembourg, but the Parliament usually meets in Brussels and sometimes in Strasbourg. Luxembourg is also site of the EFTA Court, which is responsible for the three EFTA members who are part of the European Single Market through the EEA Agreement.

=== Military ===
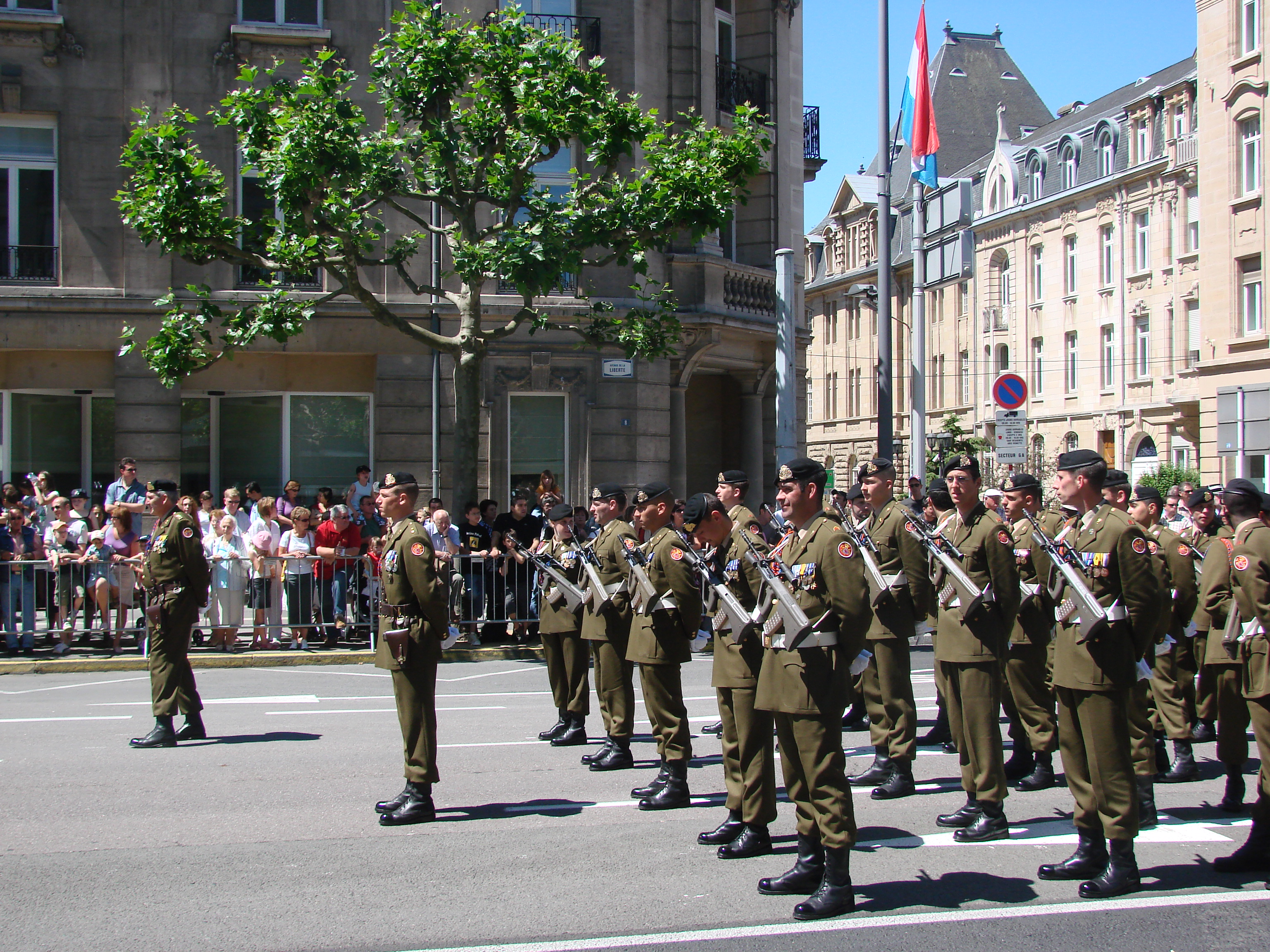
Luxembourgish soldiers on parade during National Day, Grand Duke Day, 23 June

The Luxembourgish army is mostly based in its casern, the Centre militaire Caserne Grand-Duc Jean on the Härebierg in Diekirch. The general staff is based in the capital, the État-Major. The army is under civilian control, with the grand duke as Commander-in-Chief. The Minister for Defence, Yuriko Backes, oversees army operations. The professional head of the army is the Chief of Defence, who answers to the minister and holds the rank of general.

Being landlocked, Luxembourg has no navy. Seventeen NATO AWACS aeroplanes are registered as aircraft of Luxembourg. In accordance with a joint agreement with Belgium, both countries have put forth funding for one A400M military cargo plane.

Luxembourg has participated in the Eurocorps, has contributed troops to the UNPROFOR and IFOR missions in former Yugoslavia, and has participated with a small contingent in the NATO SFOR mission in Bosnia and Herzegovina. Luxembourg troops have also deployed to Afghanistan, to support ISAF. The army has also participated in humanitarian relief missions such as setting up refugee camps for Kurds and providing emergency supplies to Albania.

=== Human rights ===
Luxembourg is liberal on civil rights protections. In 2015, Luxembourg amended its marriage law to include same-sex couples. In 2026, Luxembourg became the second country in the world to enshrine abortion access within its constitution, following France in 2024.

== Economy ==
Luxembourg is part of the eurozone (countries in dark blue).

Luxembourg's stable and high-income market economy features moderate growth, low inflation, and a high level of innovation. Unemployment is traditionally low, though it reached 6.1% by May 2012 after the Great Recession. In 2011, according to the IMF, Luxembourg was the world's second-richest country, with a per capita GDP on a purchasing-power parity (PPP) basis of $80,119; by 2023 it was ranked first. Its GDP per capita in purchasing power standards was 261% of the EU average (100%) in 2019. Luxembourg ranks 13th in The Heritage Foundation's Index of Economic Freedom, 26th in the United Nations' Human Development Index, and fourth in the Economist Intelligence Unit's quality of life index. It ranked 23rd in the Global Innovation Index in 2025.

The industrial sector, dominated by steel until the 1960s, has since diversified to include chemicals, rubber, and other products. During recent decades, growth in the financial sector has more than compensated for the decline in steel production. Services, especially banking and finance, account for the majority of the economic output. Luxembourg is the world's second-largest investment fund centre (after the United States), the most important private banking centre in the eurozone and Europe's leading centre for reinsurance companies. Moreover, Luxembourg's government has aimed to attract Internet startups, with Skype and Amazon being two of the many Internet companies that have shifted their regional headquarters to Luxembourg. Other high-tech companies have established themselves in Luxembourg, including 3D scanner developer/manufacturer Artec 3D.

Agriculture employed about 2.1% of Luxembourg's active population in 2010, when there were 2,200 agricultural holdings with an average area per holding of 60 hectares.

Luxembourg has especially close trade and financial ties to Belgium and the Netherlands (see Benelux), and as a member of the EU it enjoys the advantages of the open European market.

With $171 billion in May 2015, the country ranked 11th in the world in holdings of U.S. Treasury securities. However, securities owned by non-Luxembourg residents, but held in custodial accounts in Luxembourg, are included in this figure.

As of 2019, Luxembourg's public debt totalled $15,687,000,000, or $25,554 per capita. The debt to GDP was 22.10%.

The Luxembourg labour market represents 445,000 jobs occupied by 120,000 Luxembourgers, 120,000 foreign residents and 205,000 cross-border commuters. The latter pay their taxes in Luxembourg, but their education is partially financed by their country of residence. Luxembourg's government has never shared its tax revenues with the local authorities on the French border. This system is seen by some as one of the keys to Luxembourg's economic growth, but at the expense of the border countries.

=== Luxembourg as a tax haven ===
In April 2009, concern about Luxembourg's banking secrecy laws, as well as its reputation as a tax haven, led to its being added to a "grey list" of nations with questionable banking arrangements by the G20. In response, the country soon adopted OECD standards on exchange of information and was subsequently added into the category of "jurisdictions that have substantially implemented the internationally agreed tax standard". In March 2010, the Sunday Telegraph reported that most of Kim Jong Il's $4 billion in secret accounts was in Luxembourg banks. Amazon.co.uk also benefits from Luxembourg tax loopholes by channelling substantial UK revenues, as reported by The Guardian in April 2012. Luxembourg ranked third on the Tax Justice Network's 2011 Financial Secrecy Index of the world's major tax havens, scoring only slightly behind the Cayman Islands. In 2013, Luxembourg was ranked the second safest tax haven in the world, behind Switzerland.

In early November 2014, just days after becoming head of the European Commission, Luxembourg's former Prime Minister Jean-Claude Juncker was hit by media disclosures—derived from a document leak known as LuxLeaks—that Luxembourg had turned into a major European centre of corporate tax avoidance under his premiership.

=== Transport ===
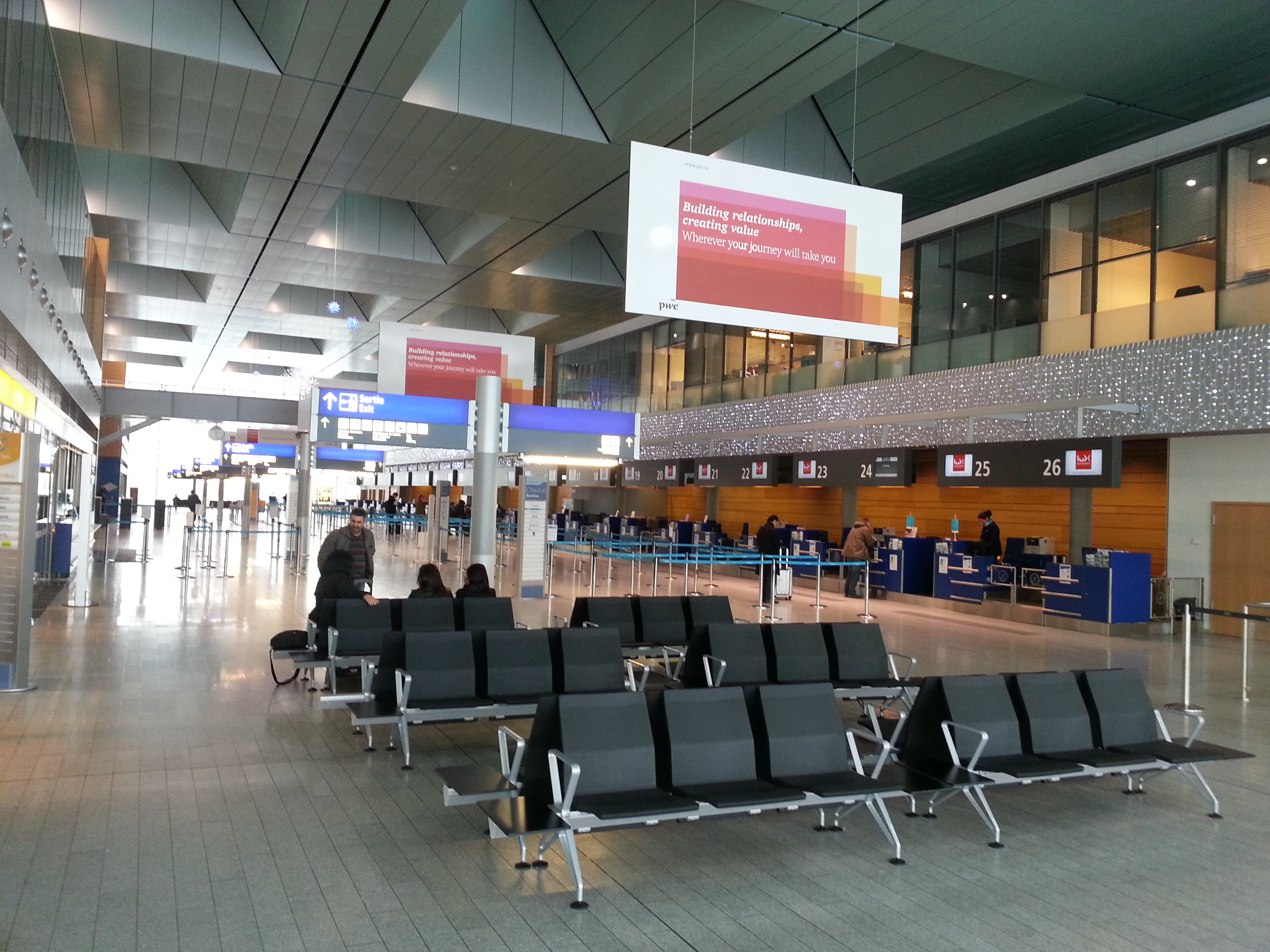
Luxembourg's international airline Luxair is based at Luxembourg Airport, the country's only international airport.

Luxembourg has road, rail and air transport facilities and services. The road network has been significantly modernised in recent years with 165 km (103 mi) of motorways connecting the capital to adjacent countries. The advent of the high-speed TGV link to Paris has led to renovation of the city's railway station and a new passenger terminal at Luxembourg Airport was opened in 2008. Luxembourg City reintroduced trams in December 2017 and there are plans to open light-rail lines to connect Luxembourg City with Esch-sur-Alzette by 2030.

There are 681 cars per 1000 persons in Luxembourg—higher than in most other states, though surpassed by the United States, Canada, Australia, New Zealand, Iceland, and other small states like the Principality of Monaco, San Marino, Liechtenstein, the British overseas territory of Gibraltar, and Brunei.

On 29 February 2020, Luxembourg became the first country to introduce no-charge public transportation, which is almost completely funded by public taxation. Ridership of buses, trains and trams has grown consistently since, though operating costs had nearly doubled by 2025.

=== Communications ===
The telecommunications industry in Luxembourg is liberalised and the electronic communications networks are significantly developed. Competition between the different operators is guaranteed by the legislative framework Paquet Telecom of the Government of 2011 which transposes the European Telecom Directives into Luxembourgish law. This encourages the investment in networks and services. The regulator ILR – Institut Luxembourgeois de Régulation ensures the compliance to these legal rules.

Luxembourg has modern and widely deployed optical fibre and cable networks throughout the country. In 2010, the Luxembourg Government launched its National strategy for very high-speed networks with the aim to become a global leader in terms of very high-speed broadband by achieving full 1 Gbit/s coverage of the country by 2020. In 2011, Luxembourg had an NGA coverage of 75%. In April 2013, Luxembourg featured the sixth highest download speed worldwide and the second highest in Europe: 32.46 Mbit/s. The country's location in Central Europe, stable economy and low taxes favour the telecommunication industry.

It ranks second in the world in the development of the Information and Communication Technologies in the ITU ICT Development Index and 8th in the Global Broadband Quality Study 2009 by the University of Oxford and the University of Oviedo.

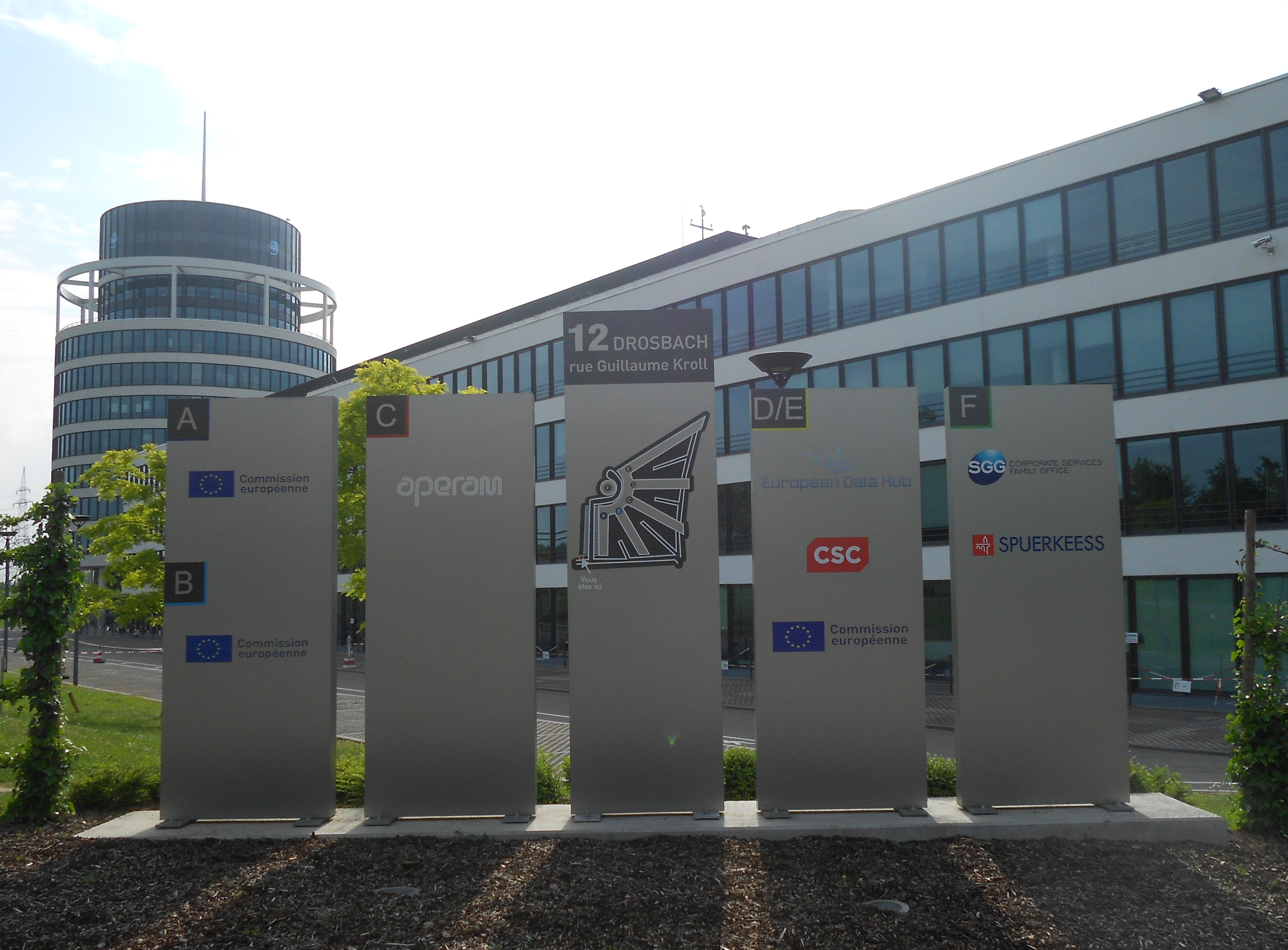
Signs in front of the Centre Drosbach near the Cloche d'Or, in the city of Luxembourg

Luxembourg is connected to all major European Internet Exchanges (AMS-IX Amsterdam, DE-CIX Frankfurt, LINX London), data centres and POPs through redundant optical networks. In addition, the country is connected to the virtual meet-me room services (vmmr) of the international data hub operator Ancotel. This enables Luxembourg to interconnect with all major telecommunication operators and data carriers worldwide. The interconnection points are in Frankfurt, London, New York and Hong Kong. Luxembourg has established itself as one of the leading financial technology (FinTech) hubs in Europe, with the Luxembourg government supporting initiatives like the Luxembourg House of Financial Technology.

Some 20 data centres are operating in Luxembourg. Six data centres are Tier IV Design certified: three of ebrc, two of LuxConnect and one of European Data Hub. In a survey on nine international data centres carried out in December 2012 and January 2013 and measuring availability (up-time) and performance (delay by which the data from the requested website was received), the top three positions were held by Luxembourg data centres.

=== Energy ===
Luxembourg has a high demand for transportation fuels and fossil fuels. Despite that, Luxembourg's climate law sets a goal that by 2030 it would have reduced emission down to 55%, as well as getting 49% of all cars to be electric by 2030. Luxembourg has adopted some measures to reach that goal, including a carbon tax that encourage renewable generations. Several groups also support energy efficiency.

== Demographics ==
=== Largest communes ===
Largest cities or towns in Luxembourg 2026
Rank	Name	Canton	Pop.	Rank	Name	Canton	Pop.
1	Luxembourg	Luxembourg Canton	137,678	11	Strassen	Luxembourg Canton	10,831
2	Esch-sur-Alzette	Esch-sur-Alzette Canton	38,275	12	Ettelbruck	Diekirch Canton	10,212
3	Differdange	Esch-sur-Alzette Canton	31,421	13	Kayl	Esch-sur-Alzette Canton	9,989
4	Dudelange	Esch-sur-Alzette Canton	22,379	14	Bertrange	Luxembourg Canton	9,489
5	Pétange	Esch-sur-Alzette Canton	21,290	15	Walferdange	Luxembourg Canton	9,256
6	Sanem	Esch-sur-Alzette Canton	19,611	16	Junglinster	Grevenmacher Canton	9,139
7	Hesperange	Luxembourg Canton	17,264	17	Wiltz	Wiltz Canton	8,538
8	Bettembourg	Esch-sur-Alzette Canton	11,651	18	Kehlen	Capellen Canton	7,449
9	Schifflange	Esch-sur-Alzette Canton	11,674	19	Diekirch	Diekirch Canton	7,398
10	Käerjeng	Capellen Canton	11,343	20	Mondercange	Esch-sur-Alzette Canton	7,312

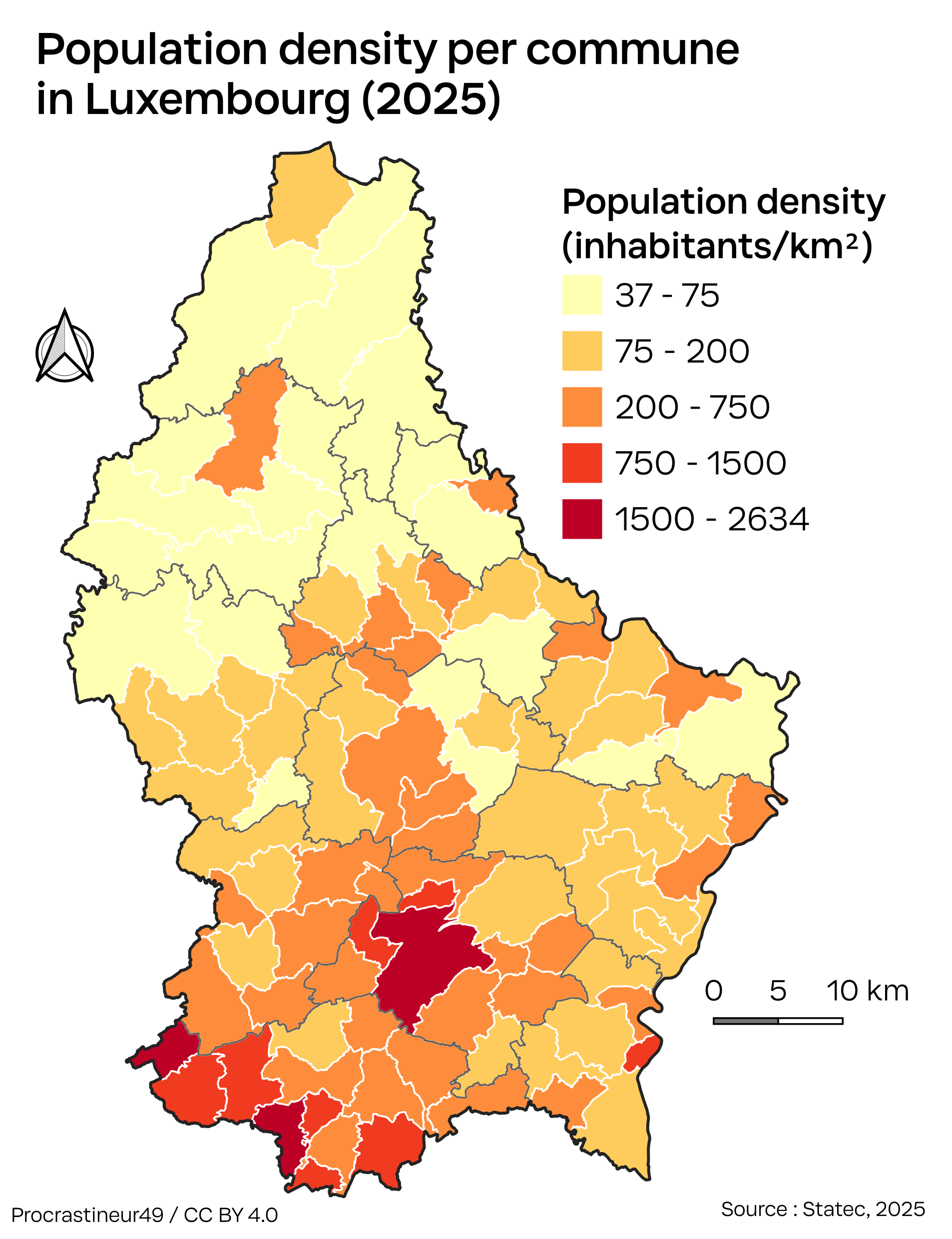
Population density in Luxembourg by communes. The main urban area, Luxembourg City, is located in the south-centre of the country.

=== Ethnicity ===
Largest groups of immigrants (2025)
1. Portugal (89,671)
2. France (49,185)
3. Italy (25,374)
4. Belgium (18,582)
5. Germany (12,288)
6. Spain (9,917)
7. Romania (6,898)
8. Ukraine (5,597)
9. India (5,474)
10. Poland (5,150)

The people of Luxembourg are called Luxembourgers. The immigrant population increased in the 20th century due to the arrival of immigrants from Belgium, France, Italy, Germany, and Portugal; the last comprised the largest group. In 2013 about 88,000 Luxembourg inhabitants possessed Portuguese nationality. In 2025, there were 681,973 permanent residents, 47% of which were of foreign nationals; the largest foreign national groups were the Portuguese, comprising 13.2% of the total population, followed by the French (7.2%), Italians (3.7%), Belgians (2.7%) and Germans (1.8%). Another 7.2% were of another EU nationality, 3.5% were non-EU European, and 7.2% were from outside Europe.

Since the beginning of the Yugoslav wars, Luxembourg has seen many immigrants from Bosnia and Herzegovina, Montenegro, and Serbia. Annually, over 10,000 new immigrants arrive in Luxembourg, mostly from the EU states, as well as Eastern Europe. In 2000 there were 162,000 immigrants in Luxembourg, accounting for 37% of the total population. There were an estimated 5,000 illegal immigrants in Luxembourg in 1999.

=== Language ===
Luxembourg does not have any "official" languages as such. As determined by the 1984 Language Regimen Act (French: Loi sur le régime des langues), Luxembourgish is the sole national language of the Luxembourgish people. It is considered the mother tongue or "language of the heart" for Luxembourgers and the language they generally use to speak or write to each other. Luxembourgish as well as the dialects in adjacent Germany belong to the Moselle Franconian subgroup of the main West Central German dialect group, which are largely mutually intelligible across the border, but Luxembourgish also has more than 5,000 words of French origin. Knowledge of Luxembourgish is a criterion for naturalization.

In addition to Luxembourgish, French and German are used in administrative and judicial matters, making all three administrative languages of Luxembourg. Per article 4 of the law promulgated in 1984, if a citizen asks a question in Luxembourgish, German or French, the administration must reply, as far as possible, in the language in which the question was asked.

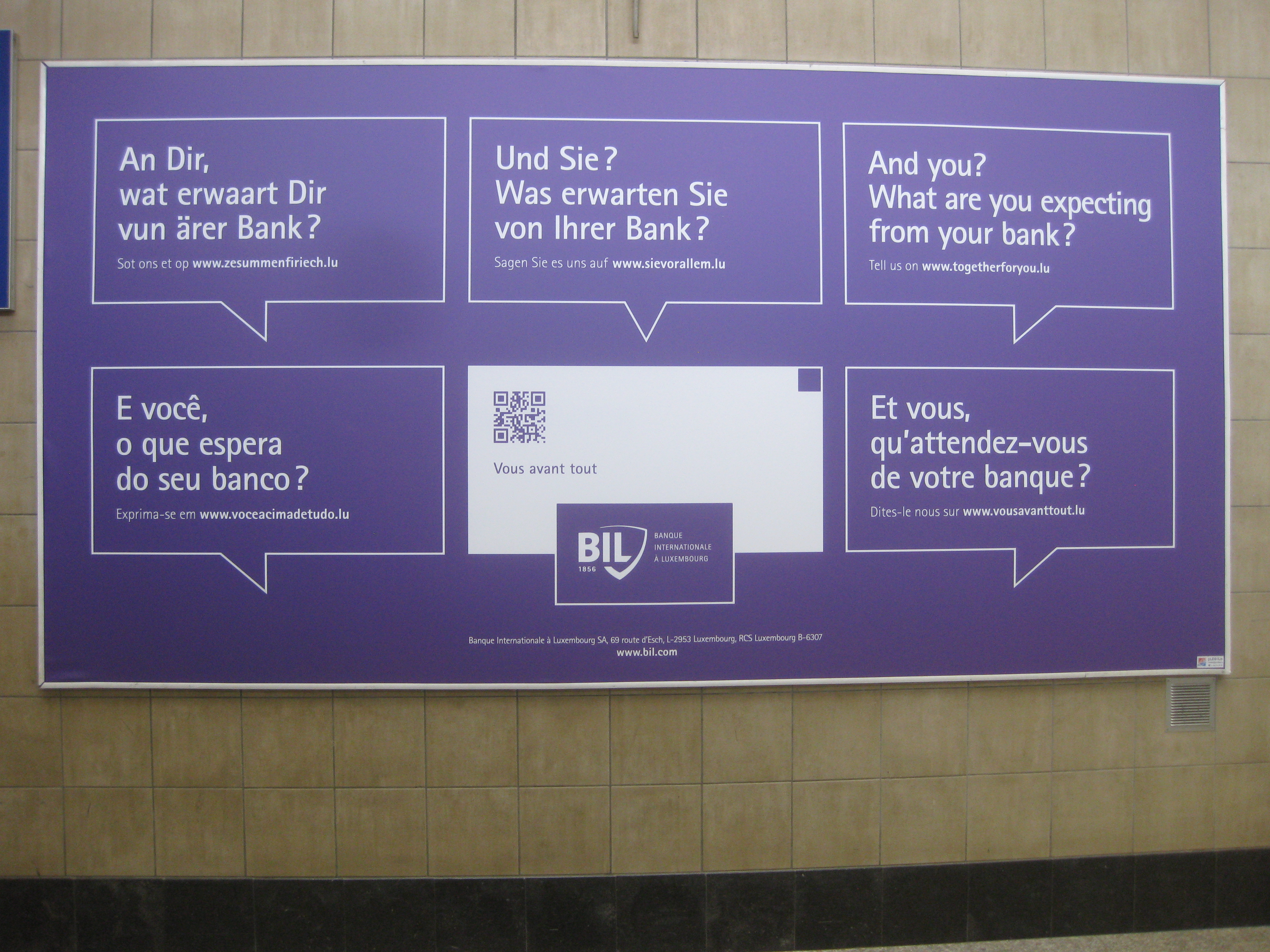
Advertisement from a bank in Luxembourg with translations in (clockwise from top left) Luxembourgish, German, English, French, and Portuguese

Luxembourg is largely multilingual. According to 2021 census data, 48.9% of citizens claimed Luxembourgish as their main language, 15.4% Portuguese, 14.9% French, 3.6% English, 3.6% Italian, 2.9% German and 10.8% different languages (the most spoken ones being Spanish, Arabic, Dutch, Russian, Polish and Romanian).

Main language	2021 census		2011 census	
Main language	Absolute	%	Absolute	%
Luxembourgish	275,361	48.9%	265,731	55.8%
Portuguese	86,598	15.4%	74,636	15.7%
French	83,802	14.9%	57,633	12.1%
English	20,316	3.6%	10,018	2.1%
Italian	20,021	3.6%	13,896	2.9%
German	16,412	2.9%	14,658	3.1%
Other languages	60,582	10.8%	40,042	8.4%
Total	563.092	100%	476,614	100%

Though not the most common mother tongue in Luxembourg, French is the most widely-known language in the country: in 2018, 98% of citizens were able to speak it. The vast majority of Luxembourg residents are able to speak it as a second or third language. As of 2018, much of the population was able to speak multiple other languages: 80% of citizens reported being able to hold a conversation in English, 78% in German and 77% in Luxembourgish, claiming these languages as their respective second, third or fourth language.

Each of the three official languages is used as a primary language in certain spheres of everyday life, without being exclusive. Luxembourgish is the language that Luxembourgers generally use to speak and write to each other, and there has been a recent increase in the production of novels and movies in the language. At the same time, the numerous expatriate workers (approximately 44% of the population) generally do not use it to speak to each other.

Most official business and written communication is carried out in French, which is also the language mostly used for public communication, with written official statements, advertising displays and road signs generally in French. Due to the historical influence of the Napoleonic Code on the legal system of the Grand Duchy, French is also the sole language of the legislation and generally the preferred language of the government, administration and justice. Parliamentary debates are mostly conducted in Luxembourgish, whereas written government communications and official documents (e.g. administrative or judicial decisions, passports, etc.) are drafted mostly in French and sometimes additionally in German.

Although professional life is largely multilingual, French is described by private sector business leaders as the main working language of their companies (56%), followed by Luxembourgish (20%), English (18%), and German (6%).

German is very often used in much of the media along with French and is considered by most Luxembourgers their second language. This is mostly due to the high similarity of German to Luxembourgish but also because it is the first language taught to children in primary school (language of literacy acquisition).

Due to the large community of Portuguese origin, the Portuguese language is fairly prevalent in Luxembourg, though it remains limited to the relationships inside this community. Portuguese has no official status, but the administration sometimes makes certain informative documents available in Portuguese.

Even though Luxembourg is largely multilingual today, some people claim that Luxembourg is subject of intense francization and that Luxembourgish and German are in danger of disappearing in the country. This would make Luxembourg either a unilingual Francophone country, or at best a bilingual French- and English-speaking country sometime in the far future.

=== Religion ===
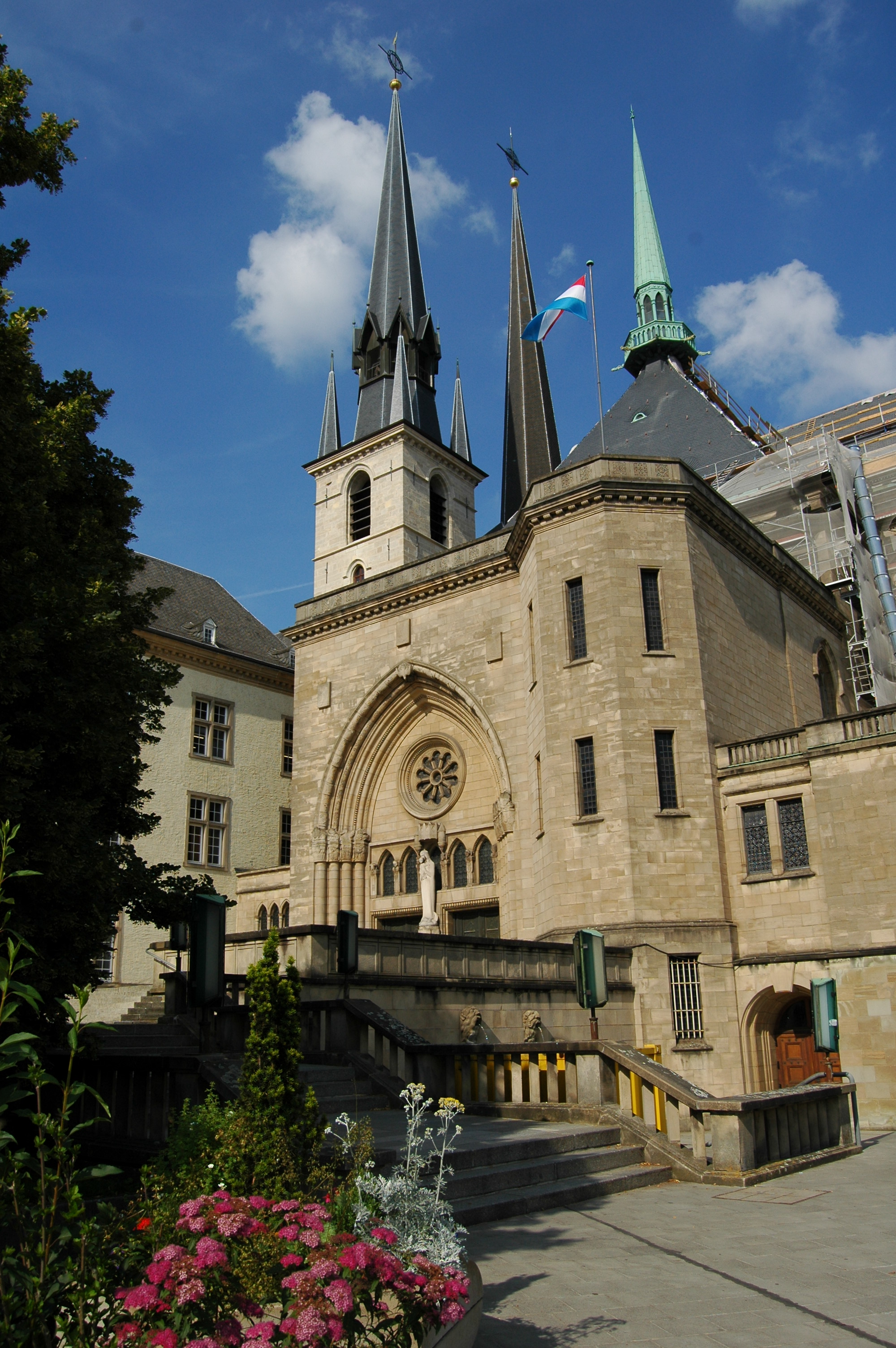
Notre-Dame Cathedral, Luxembourg City

Luxembourg is a secular state, but the state recognizes certain religions as officially mandated religions. This gives the state a hand in religious administration and appointment of clergy, in exchange for which the state pays certain running costs and wages. Religions covered by such arrangements are Catholicism, Judaism, Greek Orthodoxy, Anglicanism, Russian Orthodoxy, Lutheranism, Calvinism, Mennonitism, and Islam.

Since 1980, it has been illegal for the government to collect statistics on religious beliefs or practices. According to a 2021 Eurobarometer survey, 53% are Christian (46% Catholic, 2% Protestant, 2% Orthodox, 3% other Christians), 1% Muslim, 38% unaffiliated (25% not religious or agnostic and 13% atheist) and 7% follow other religions.

According to a 2005 Eurobarometer poll, 44% of Luxembourg citizens responded that "they believe there is a God", whereas 28% answered that "they believe there is some sort of spirit or life force", and 22% that "they do not believe there is any sort of spirit, god, or life force".

=== Education ===
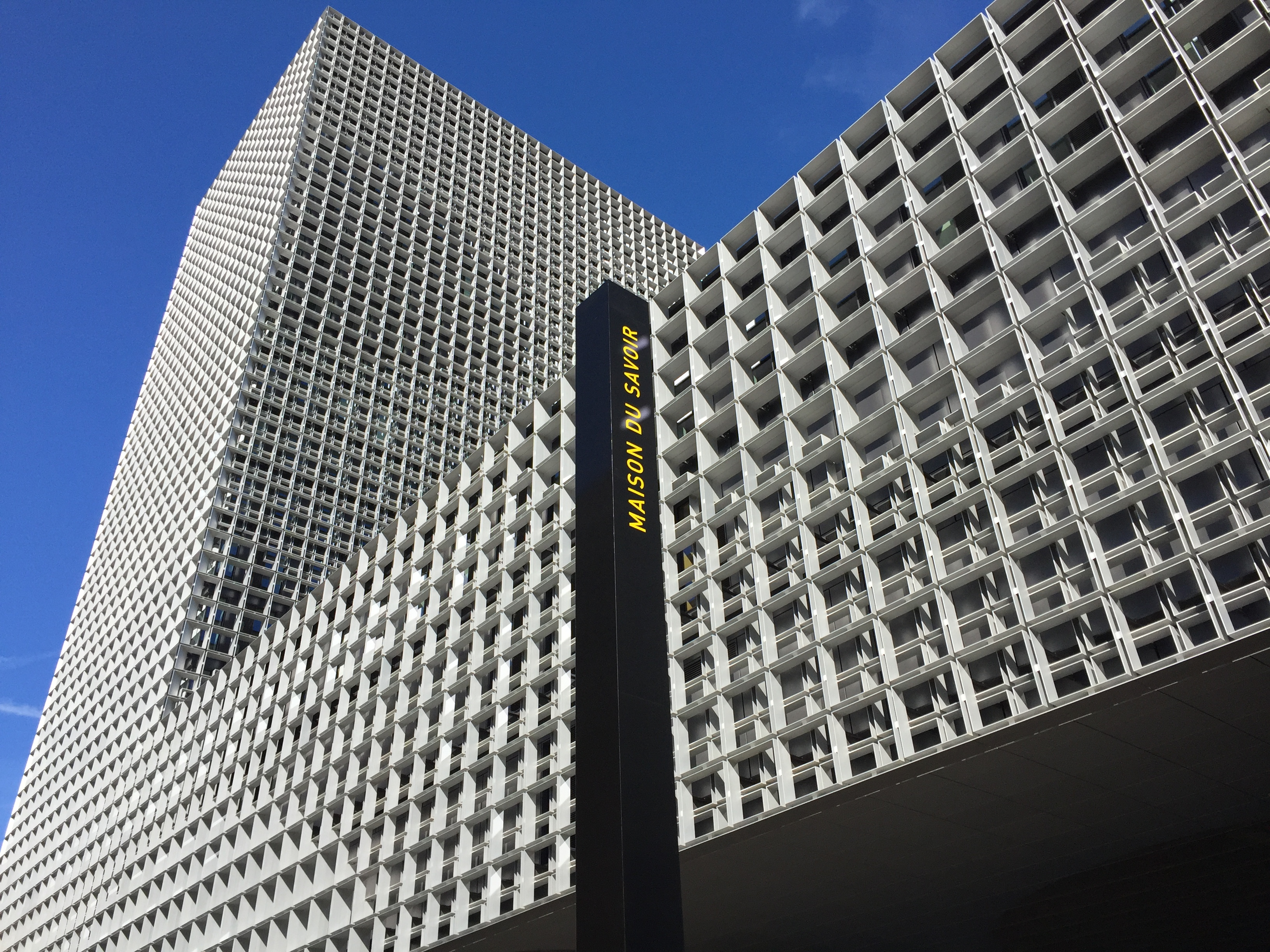
The University of Luxembourg is the only university based in the country.

Luxembourg's education system is trilingual: the first years of primary school are in Luxembourgish, before changing to German; while in secondary school, the language of instruction changes to French. Proficiency in all three languages is required for graduation from secondary school. In addition to the three national languages, English is taught in compulsory schooling and much of the population of Luxembourg can speak English. The past two decades have highlighted the growing importance of English in several sectors, in particular the financial sector. Portuguese, the language of the largest immigrant community, is also spoken by large segments of the population, but by relatively few from outside the Portuguese-speaking community.

The University of Luxembourg, created in 2003, is the only university based in Luxembourg. In 2014, the Luxembourg School of Business, a graduate business school, was created through private initiative and received the accreditation from the Ministry of Higher Education and Research of Luxembourg in 2017. Miami University, an American university, maintains the Dolibois European Center satellite campus in Differdange.

=== Health ===
According to data from the World Health Organization, healthcare spending on behalf of the government of Luxembourg topped $4.1 billion, amounting to about $8,182 for each citizen in the nation. Luxembourg allows residents to choose their own doctor while also having public healthcare cover 80% to 90% of all healthcare costs. The nation of Luxembourg collectively spent nearly 7% of its gross domestic product on health, placing it among the highest spending countries on health services and related programmes in 2010, and 6th place in highest health index of countries in Europe in 2023.

== Culture ==
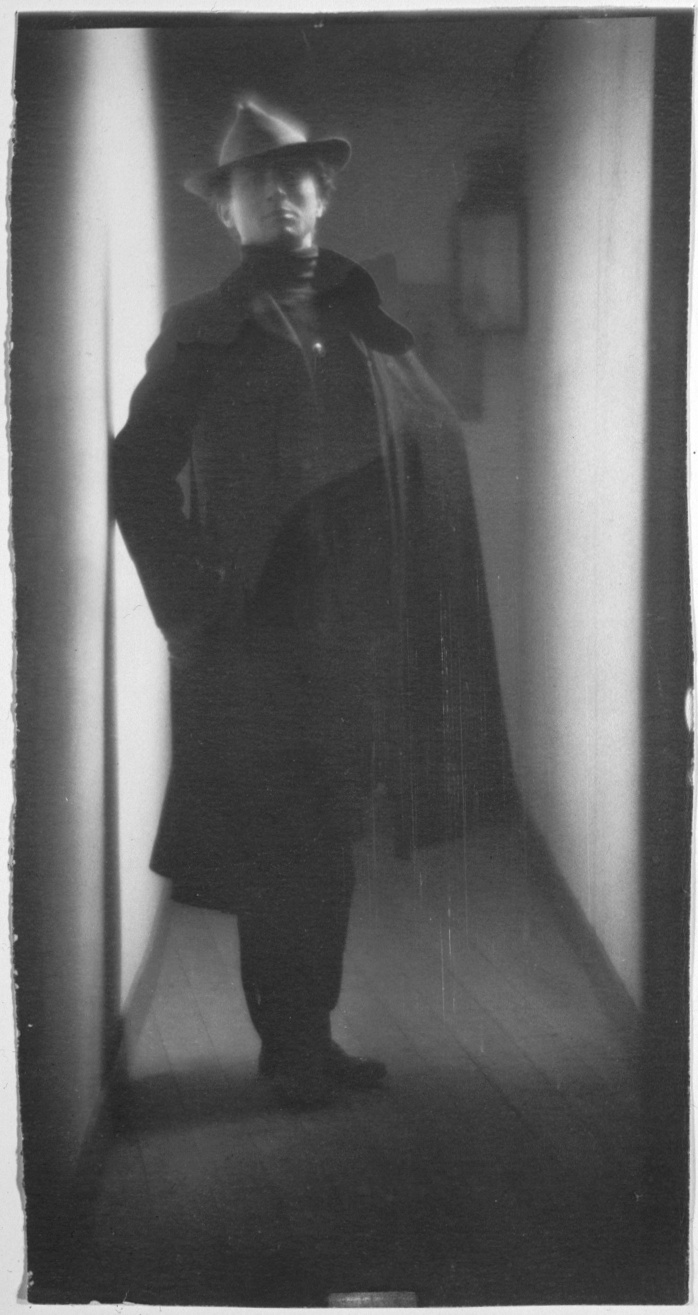
Edward Steichen, photographer and painter

Luxembourg has been heavily influenced by the culture of its neighbours. It retains a number of folk traditions, having been for much of its history a profoundly rural country. There are several notable museums, located mostly in the capital. These include the National Museum of History and Art (NMHA), the Luxembourg City History Museum, and the new Grand Duke Jean Museum of Modern Art (Mudam). The National Museum of Military History (MNHM) in Diekirch is especially known for its representations of the Battle of the Bulge. The Old City of Luxembourg is part of the UNESCO World Heritage List, on account of the historical importance of its fortifications.

The country has produced some internationally known artists, including the painters Théo Kerg, Joseph Kutter and Michel Majerus, and photographer Edward Steichen, whose The Family of Man exhibition has been placed on UNESCO's Memory of the World register, and is now permanently housed in Clervaux. Editor and author Hugo Gernsback, whose publications crystallised the concept of science fiction, was born in Luxembourg City. Movie star Loretta Young was of Luxembourgish descent.

Luxembourg was a founding participant of the Eurovision Song Contest, and participated every year between 1956 and before it was relegated after the 1993 competition, except for the 1959 contest. Although Luxembourg was free to participate again in 1995, it chose not to return to the competition before 2024. It has won the competition a total of five times, in 1961, 1965, 1972, 1973 and 1983 and hosted the contest in 1962, 1966, 1973, and 1984. Only nine of its 38 entries before 2024, and none of its five winning entries, were performed by Luxembourgish artists. Its 2024 return had a particular emphasis on promoting music and artists from Luxembourg.

Luxembourg was the first city to be named European Capital of Culture twice. The first time was in 1995. In 2007, the European Capital of Culture was to be a cross-border area consisting of the Grand Duchy of Luxembourg, the Rheinland-Pfalz and Saarland in Germany, the Walloon Region and the German-speaking part of Belgium, and the Lorraine area in France. The event was an attempt to promote mobility and the exchange of ideas, crossing borders physically, psychologically, artistically and emotionally.

Luxembourg was represented at the World Expo 2010 in Shanghai, China, from 1 May to 31 October 2010 with its own pavilion. The pavilion, designed as a forest and fortress, was based on the transliteration of the word Luxembourg into Chinese, "Lúsēnbǎo", which when directly translated, means "forest and fortress". It represented Luxembourg as the "Green Heart in Europe".

=== Media ===
The main languages of media in Luxembourg are French and German. The newspaper with the largest circulation as of 2022 is the German-language daily Luxemburger Wort. Because of the strong multilingualism in Luxembourg, newspapers often alternate articles in French and articles in German, without translation. In addition, there are both English and Portuguese radio and national print publications, but accurate audience figures are difficult to gauge since the national media survey by ILRES is conducted in French.

Luxembourg is known in Europe for its radio and television stations (Radio Luxembourg and RTL Group). It is also the uplink home of SES, carrier of major European satellite services for Germany and Britain.

Due to a 1988 law that established a special tax scheme for audiovisual investment, the film and co-production in Luxembourg has grown steadily. There are some 30 registered production companies in Luxembourg.

Luxembourg won an Oscar in 2014 in the Animated Short Films category with Mr Hublot.

=== Cuisine ===
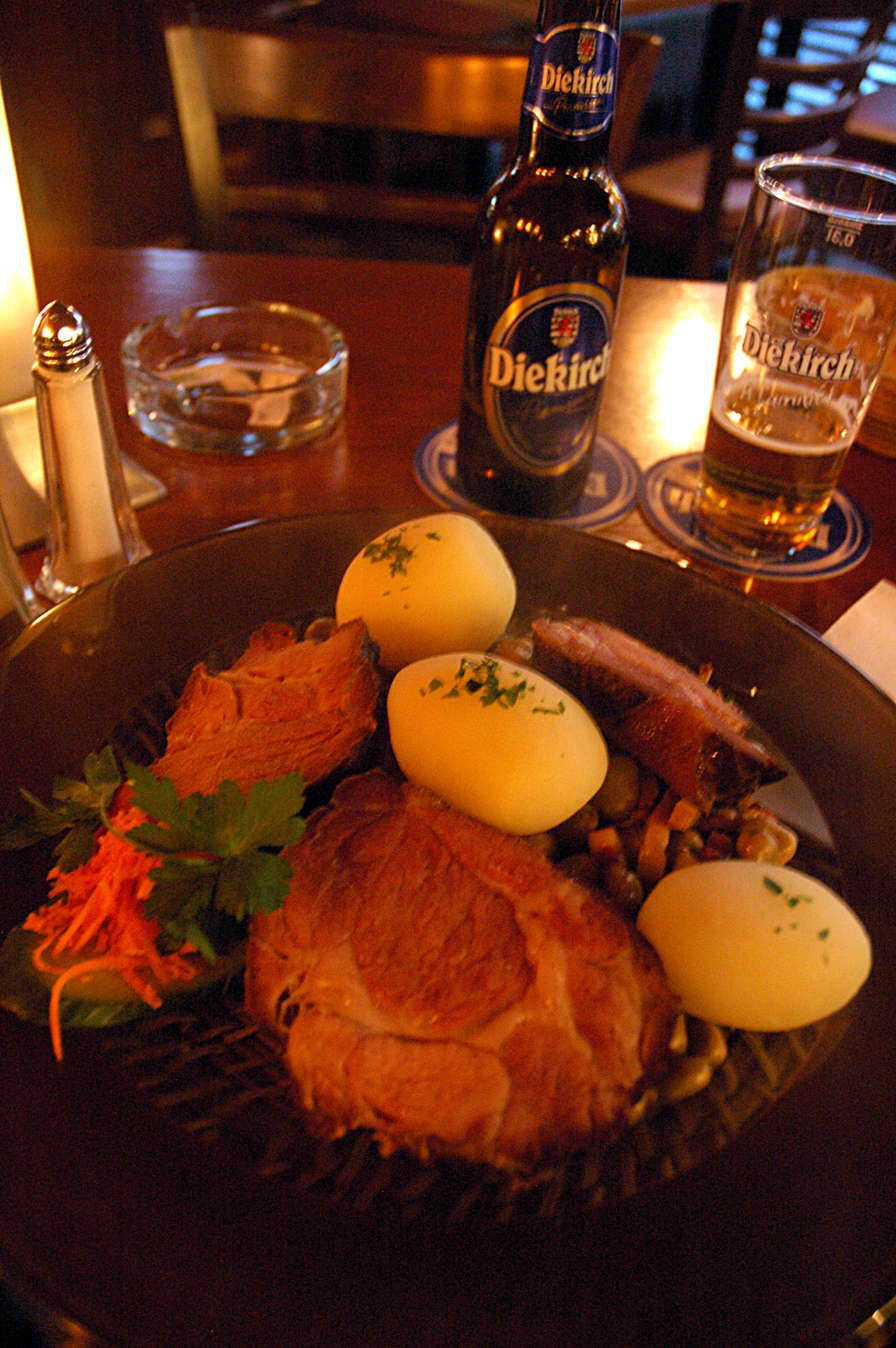
Judd mat Gaardebounen, served with boiled potatoes and Diekirch beer

Luxembourg cuisine reflects its position on the border between the Latin and Germanic worlds, being heavily influenced by the cuisines of neighbouring France and Germany. More recently, it has been enriched by its many Italian and Portuguese immigrants.

Most native Luxembourg dishes, consumed as the traditional daily fare, share roots in the country's folk dishes, the same as in neighbouring Germany.

Luxembourg sells the most alcohol in Europe per capita. However, the large proportion of alcohol purchased by customers from neighbouring countries contributes to the statistically high level of alcohol sales per capita; this level of alcohol sales is thus not representative of the actual alcohol consumption of the Luxembourg population, though it is one of the highest in the OECD.

Luxembourg has the second highest number of Michelin-starred restaurants per capita, after Japan and before Switzerland.

=== Sports ===
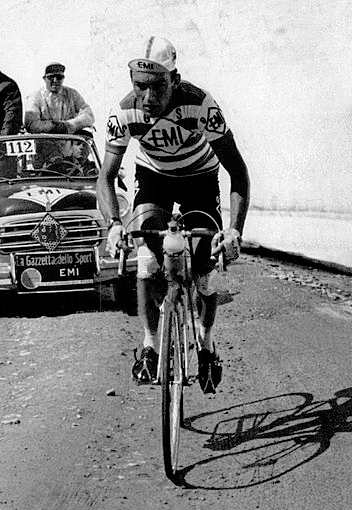
Charly Gaul won three Grand Tours in his cycling career.

Unlike most countries in Europe, sports in Luxembourg are not concentrated upon a particular national sport, but instead encompass a number of sports, both team and individual. Despite the lack of a central sporting focus, over 100,000 people in Luxembourg, out of a total population of 660,000, are licensed members of one sports federation or another. The Stade de Luxembourg, situated in Gasperich, southern Luxembourg City, is the country's national stadium and largest sports venue in the country with a capacity of 9,386 for sporting events, including football and rugby union, and 15,000 for concerts. The largest indoor venue in the country is d'Coque, Kirchberg, north-eastern Luxembourg City, which has a capacity of 8,300. The arena is used for basketball, handball, gymnastics, and volleyball, including the final of the 2007 Women's European Volleyball Championship. Hess Cycling Team is a Luxembourgish women's road cycling team.

== See also ==
- Outline of Luxembourg
- Disability in Luxembourg

== Notes and references ==
=== Works cited ===
- Kreins, Jean-Marie (2003). Histoire du Luxembourg (in French) (3rd ed.). Paris: Presses Universitaires de France. ISBN 978-2-13-053852-3.
- Pauly, Michel (2013). Geschichte Luxemburgs (in German). Munich: Beck. ISBN 978-3-406-62225-0.
- Putnam, Ruth (1918). Luxemburg and Her Neighbours. New York: G. P. Putnam's.
- Thewes, Guy (May 2011). Les gouvernements du Grand-Duché de Luxembourg depuis 1848 (PDF) (in French). Luxembourg City: Service information et presse du gouvernement luxembourgeois. ISBN 978-2-87999-212-9.
- Trausch, Gilbert (2003). Histoire du Luxembourg: le destin européen d'un petit pays (in French). Toulouse: Privat. ISBN 2-7089-4773-7. OCLC 52386195.
