= Huldange =

Village in Luxembourg

Coordinates: 50°10′N 6°01′E

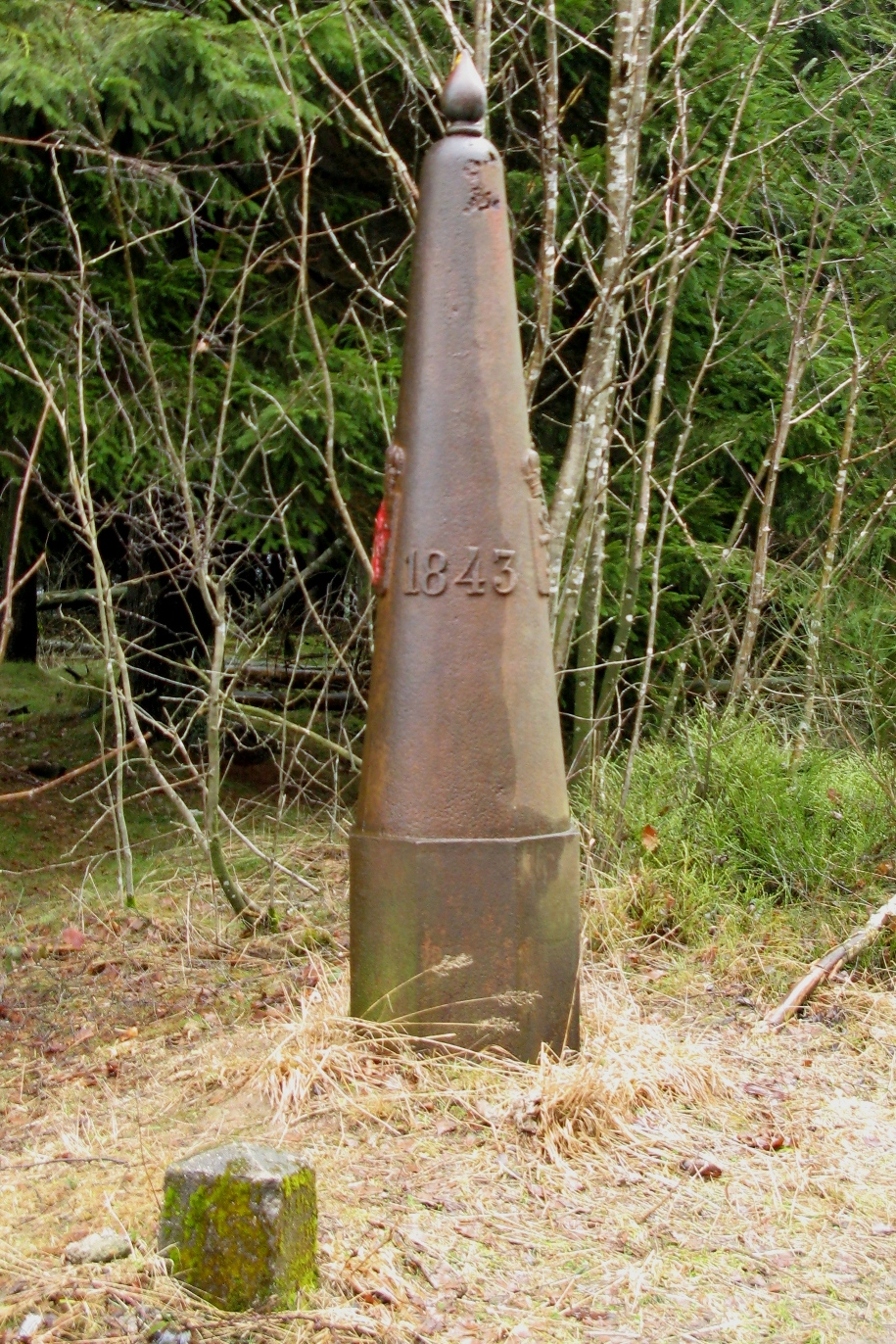
Marker post on Luxembourg-Belgium border between Huldange and Beho in Gouvy

Huldange (French pronunciation: [yldɑ̃ʒ]; Luxembourgish: Huldang, German: Huldingen) is a small town in the commune of Troisvierges, in far northern Luxembourg. As of September 2026, the town has a population of 491. Nearby is the source of the Clerve.

== Huldange train tunnel ==
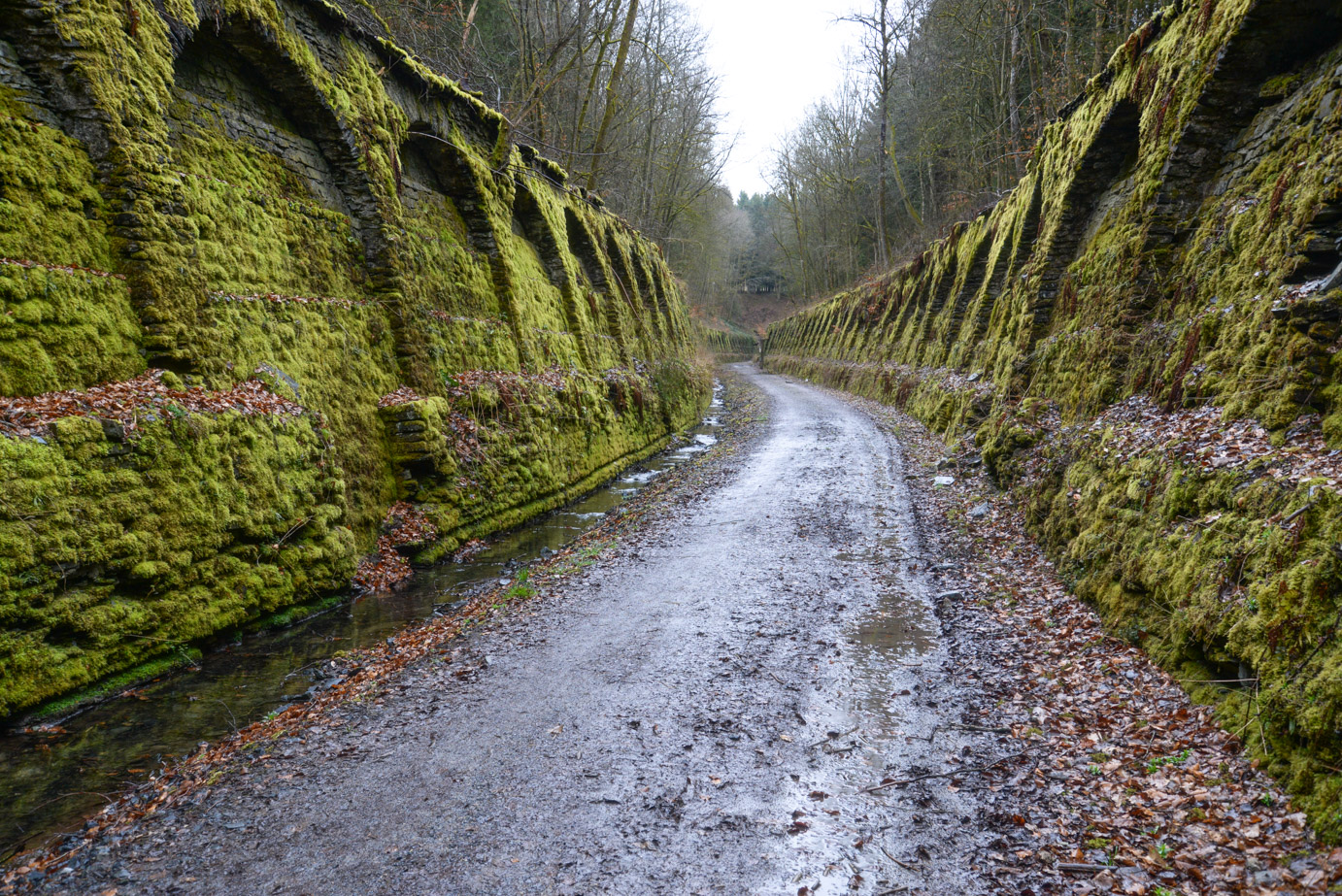
The hundreds of meters long trench up to the tunnel portal is flanked by retaining walls consisting of round arches.

Right on the border between Belgium and Luxembourg, the Huldange tunnel was inaugurated in 1889, the last hurdle for goods trains running on the Vennbahn. At its opening, the 800-meter-long Huldange tunnel was the longest in the Grand Duchy of Luxembourg. The country's two highest hills, the 559-meter-high Buurgplaatz and the one-meter-higher Kneiff flank the Vennbahn route here. Therefore, a tunnel was dug to negotiate the crest of the hill. The hundreds of meters long trench up to the tunnel portal is flanked by retaining walls consisting of round arches. This section of the Vennbahn, between Burg-Reuland and Troisvierges, was closed in 1962.
