= Drinklange =

Coordinates: 50°08′N 6°01′E

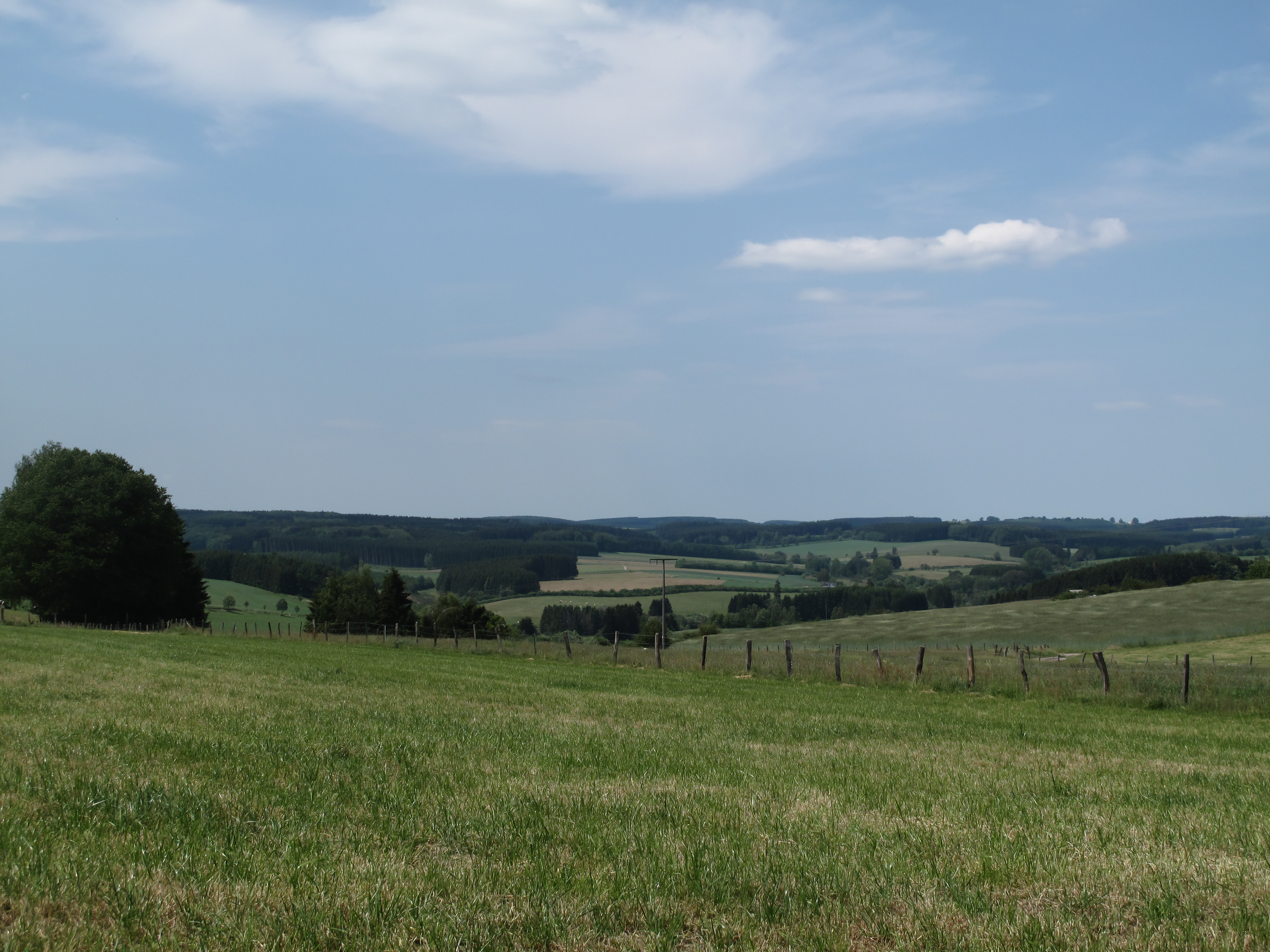
View of the landscape of the area between Drinklange and Troisvierges

Drinklange (Luxembourgish: Drénkelt, German: Drinklingen) is a village in the commune of Troisvierges, in northern Luxembourg. As of September 2026, the village has a population of 195. Drinklange is situated at an elevation of approximately 498 metres above sea level, along the main road through the Troisvierges commune, which encompasses some of the highest terrain in Luxembourg near the Buurgplaatz (559 m) and Kneiff (560 m), the two highest points in the Grand Duchy. The village contains two places of religious interest: the Chapelle Saint-Sébastien and the Église Saint-Lambert. Drinklange is part of an Open Churches heritage route promoted by the Troisvierges commune, linking the historic church buildings of the area's villages.
