= Clerve =

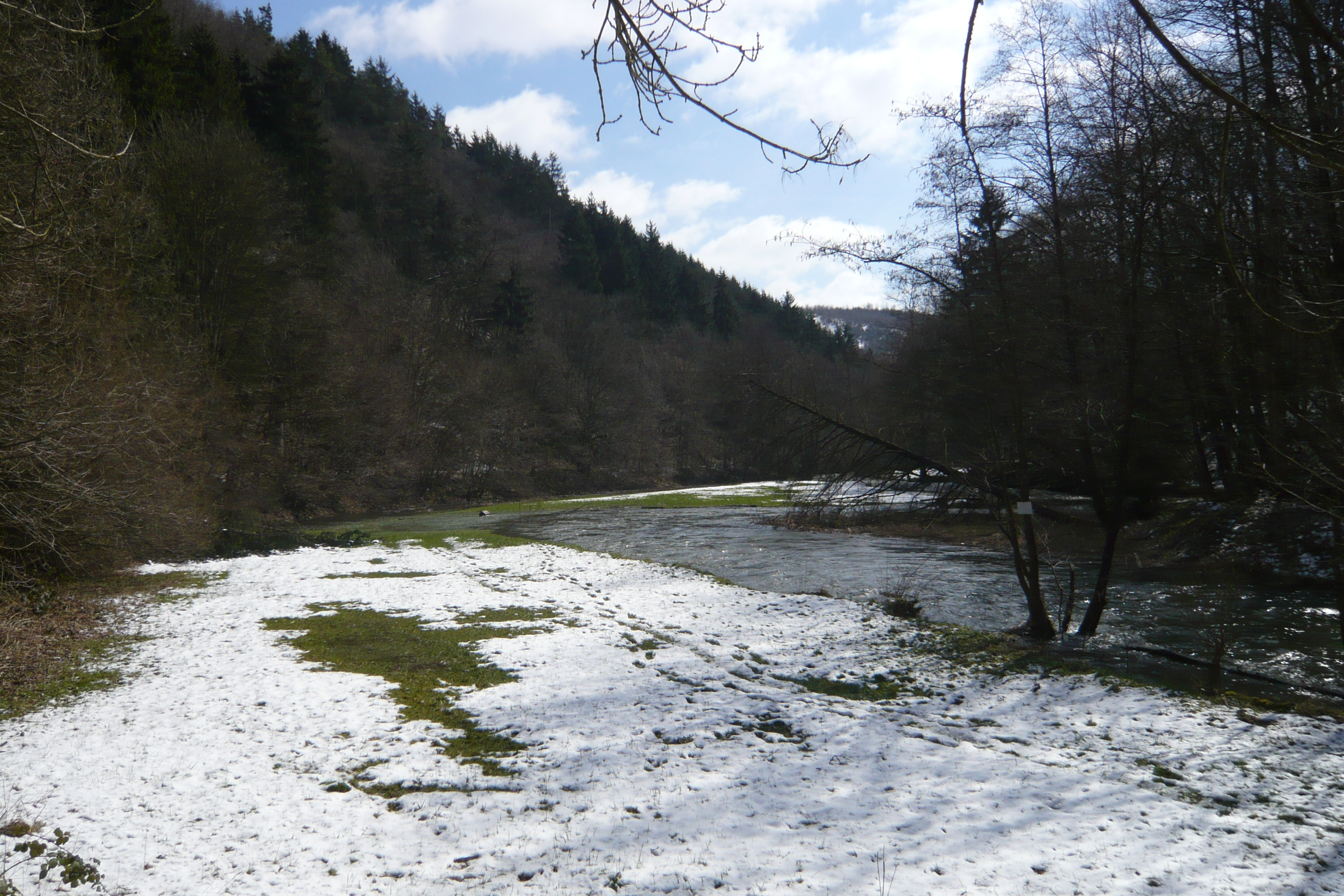
- The Clerve near Clervaux

Location
- Country: Luxembourg

Physical characteristics
- Source
  - location: Huldange
  - elevation: 530 m (1,740 ft)
- Mouth: Wiltz
  - location: Kautenbach
  - coordinates: 49.9514°N 6.0170°E
- Length: 48 km (30 mi)
- Basin size: 222 km^{2} (86 sq mi)

Basin features
- Progression: Wiltz→ Sauer→ Moselle→ Rhine→ North Sea

The Clerve (Luxembourgish: Klierf) is a river flowing through Luxembourg, joining the Wiltz at Kautenbach. It flows through both the towns of Troisvierges and the town of Clervaux. Upstream of Clervaux, it is known as the Woltz.
