= Brand (Aachen) =

- Borough of Aachen
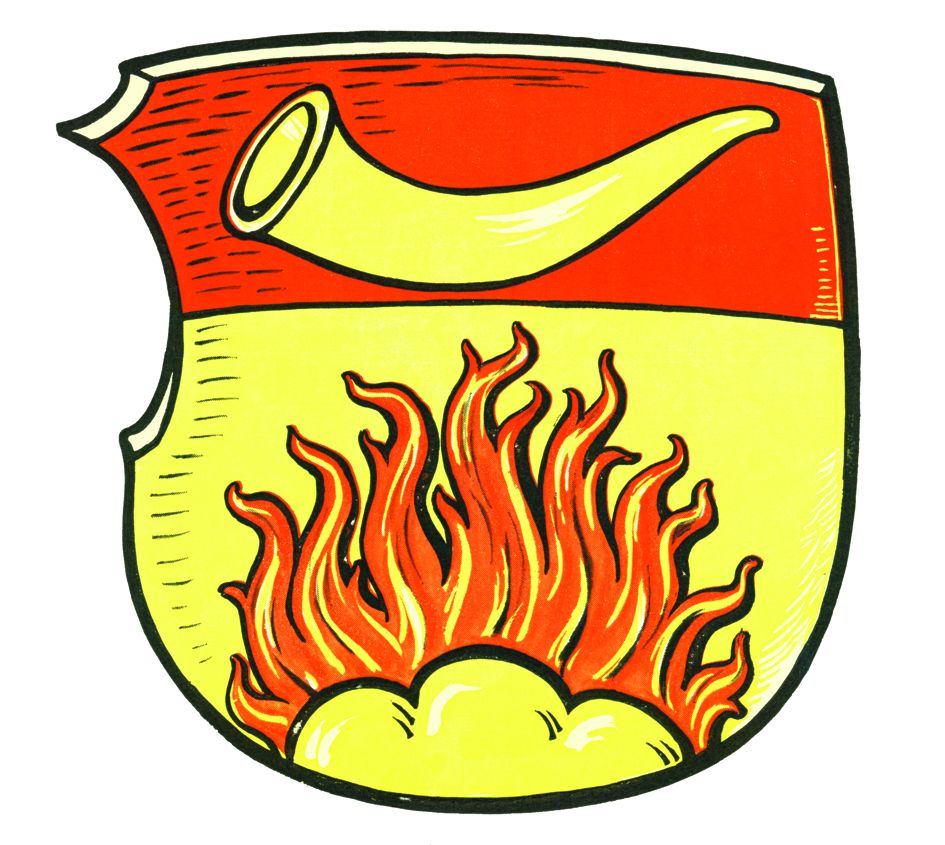
- Coat of arms
- Interactive map of Brand
- Location within Germany Location within North Rhine-Westphalia
- Coordinates: 50°44′56″N 6°9′54″E
- Country: Germany
- State: North Rhine-Westphalia
- District: Aachen (district)
- City: Aachen

Area
  - Total: 13.38 km^{2} (5.17 sq mi)
- Elevation: 262 m (860 ft)

Population (2020-12-31)
  - Total: 17,171
  - Density: 1,283/km^{2} (3,324/sq mi)
- Time zone: UTC+01:00 (CET)
  - Summer (DST): UTC+02:00 (CEST)
- Postal codes: 52076, 52078
- Dialling codes: 0241

Brand is a borough of Aachen, Germany, with about 18,000 residents. The borough lies in the south-east part of Aachen and borders Kornelimünster/Walheim, Forst, Oberforstbach und Eilendorf, as well as the town of Stolberg.

Brand was a self-administered community in the district of Aachen until 1972, when administrative reforms of the communities in the area caused Brand to be absorbed into Aachen. The current borough of Brand is made up of the towns Brand, Freund, Krauthausen, Niederforstbach, Brander Feld and Rollef.

At 270.9 meters, the highest point of the borough is a noise barrier along the Bundesautobahn 44. To the east Brand Forest can be found, which includes the Brand Forest Military Training Area.

== Town symbols and the coat of arms ==
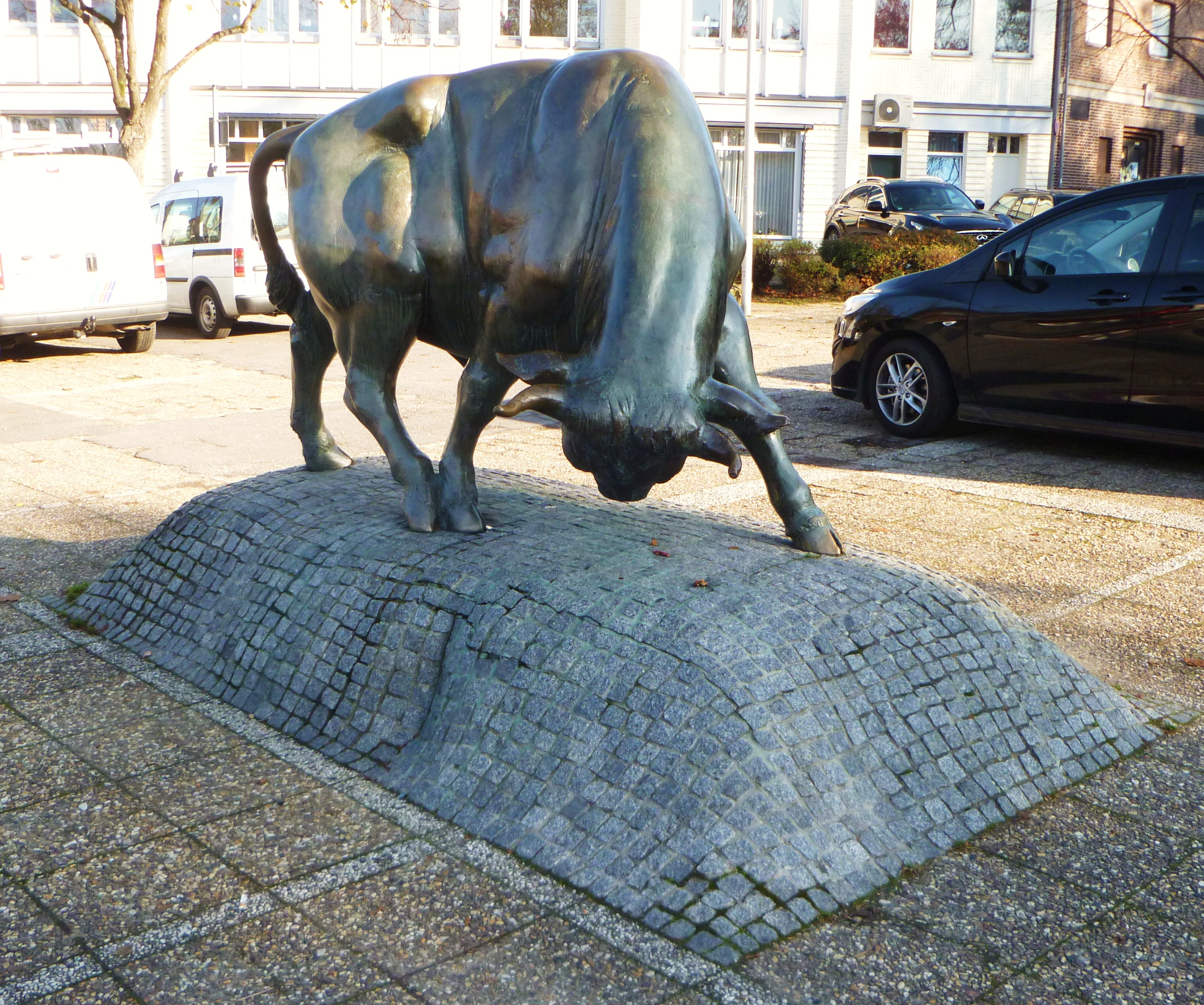
The Brand Bull, a sculpture by Karl-Henning Seemann

The Coat of Arms of Brand is divided horizontally and shows in its upper section the horn of Pope Cornelius, a symbol of the areas previous affiliation to the Kornelimünster Abbey. In the lower part is a burning set of three hills (a somewhat common heraldic device). This symbolizes the three quarters of Brand, which are Freund, Brand and Niederforstbach, and which each lie on a small hill. The fire stands for the borough's name Brand, which means “fire”. The reason that the area is called this, however, is etymologically unclear.

Symbols for the borough include the Brand Bull, which is commemorated by a bronze statue at the center of Brand. It likely stems from the town's association with the horn of Pope Cornelius on the coat of arms, and is meant to symbolize residents’ obstinacy.

== History ==
While the area of Brand was probably inhabited by Celtic people between the 2nd and 1st century b.C. (as suggested by the toponym Rollef), the first actual mention of the Brand settlement is from 1369. The Brand area belonged in this time to the Imperial Abbey of Kornelimünster. A chapel dedicated to St.Donatus has been built in 1761. With the Napoleonic occupation, in 1802 territorial sovereignty of the Kornelimünster Abbey was revoked, and Brand became a mairie within the Departement of Roer. Trierer Straße, today still the main artery of the borough, was built in the same period. In the 1890s the current St.Donatus church was built.

While there were already plans to include Brand within Aachen since 1921/1922, Brand was ultimately absorbed into Aachen in 1972 when the Aachen-Gesetz (1971) came into force.

=== Brand Heath ===
The English Count de Rice, whose personal details remain unknown, bought from the Kornelimünster Abbey more than three hundred acres of the treeless Brand Heath (which is today the area around North Street (Nordstrasse) and Erberichshof Street, bounded by Eilendorf Street (Eilendorferstr.), and at the time included the estates of Gut Neuenhof, the Krummerrück, and the Hebscheider Hof), so that he could build homes and a horse racetrack. In 1789 the Count went bankrupt and the area was repossessed, but later it was given to the community of Brand, which still built the racetrack, along with a grandstand.

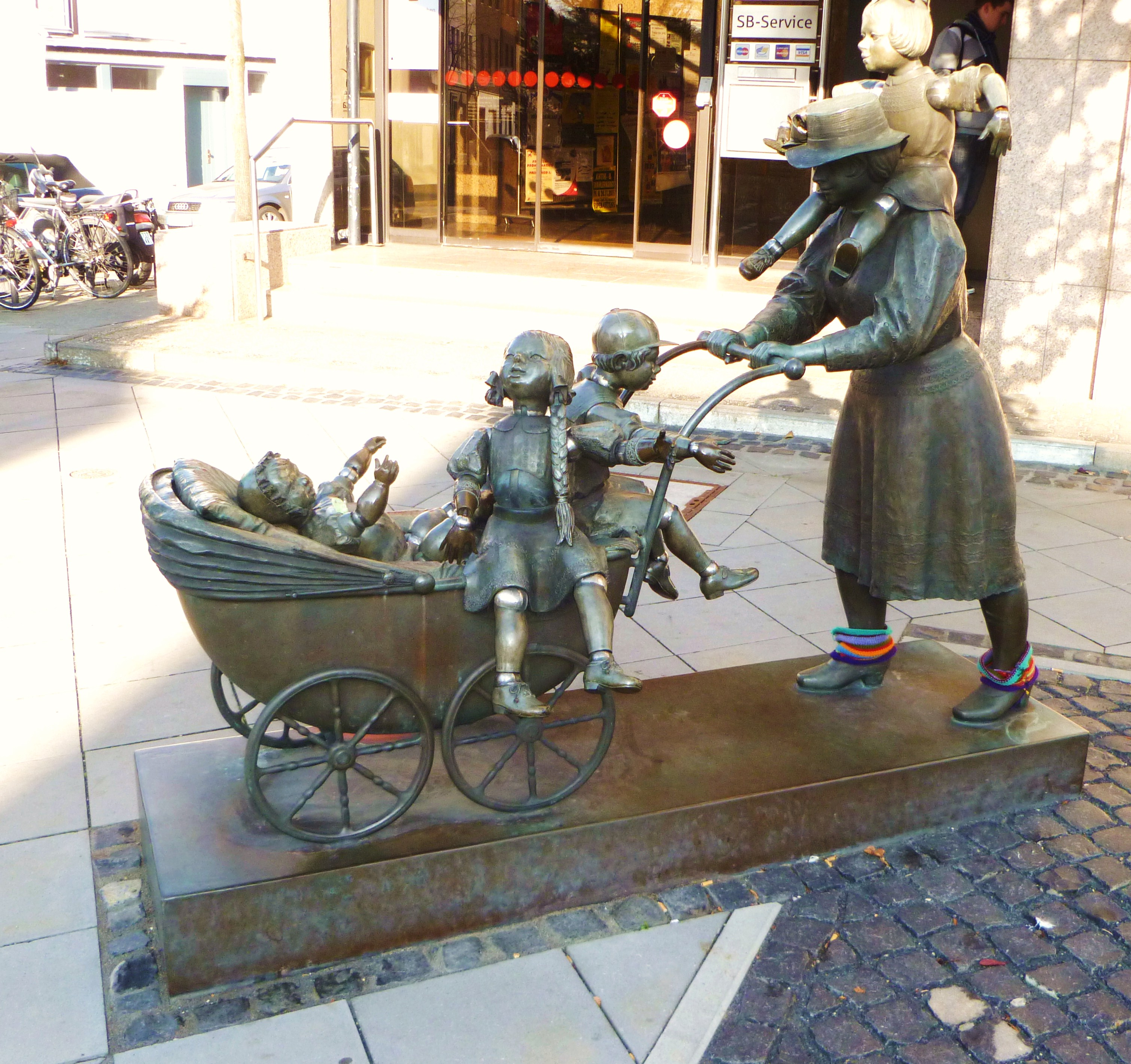
Sculpture "Kit and Caboodle" ("Mit Kind und Kegle"), by Bonifatius Stirnberg

In the 19th century, horse racing in Brand enjoyed great popularity after it had been initiated in 1830 by the industrialist James Cockerill and further expanded upon in 1870 by his grandchildren and respected gentlemen riders Otto and Henry Suermondt, who would later serve as the nucleus of the Aachen-Laurensberg Riding Club.

After the turn of the 20th century, equestrian sports in the area became more concentrated in Soers, and so the wide-open area of Brand became a staging area for Aachen area flight pioneer and airplane builder Erich Lochner. It is also here that the first flight demonstrations of a propeller driven airplane took place. Later, the Aachen Association of Aeronautics (founded in 1911 and made up of private individuals, scientists from RWTH Aachen University, and military officers) rented the area and built maintenance and assembly workshops. Until 1913, numerous flights took place here under international cooperation, but despite these initial successes, the activities of the airfield had to be stopped because the club had incurred too much debt and could no longer operate.

== Dialect ==
Brand hosts a native variant of the Aachen dialect: Brander Platt, a Ripuarian language. While moribund, Brander Platt is being now actively promoted and documented. Stories and poems in Brander Platt are available.

== Infrastructure ==
Brand features a section of the Bundesautobahn 44, the Lützow barracks of the Armed Forces, location of the technical school of the Army of the Bundeswehr, a comprehensive school (Städtische Gesamtschule Aachen-Brand) and three elementary schools (common elementary school Brand Field, Karl Kuck School, catholic municipal elementary school, and Marktschule, catholic municipal elementary school). The Catholic parish of Saint Donatus features two churches. There is also the Protestant Martin Luther Church and an LDS church. In addition, Brand has had its own public library since 1857 and a city theatre since 1998.

In addition to its own police station, there is also a voluntary fire department for the city of Aachen. A local chapter of the Technischen Hilfswerkes is also present in the district.

== Brand train station ==
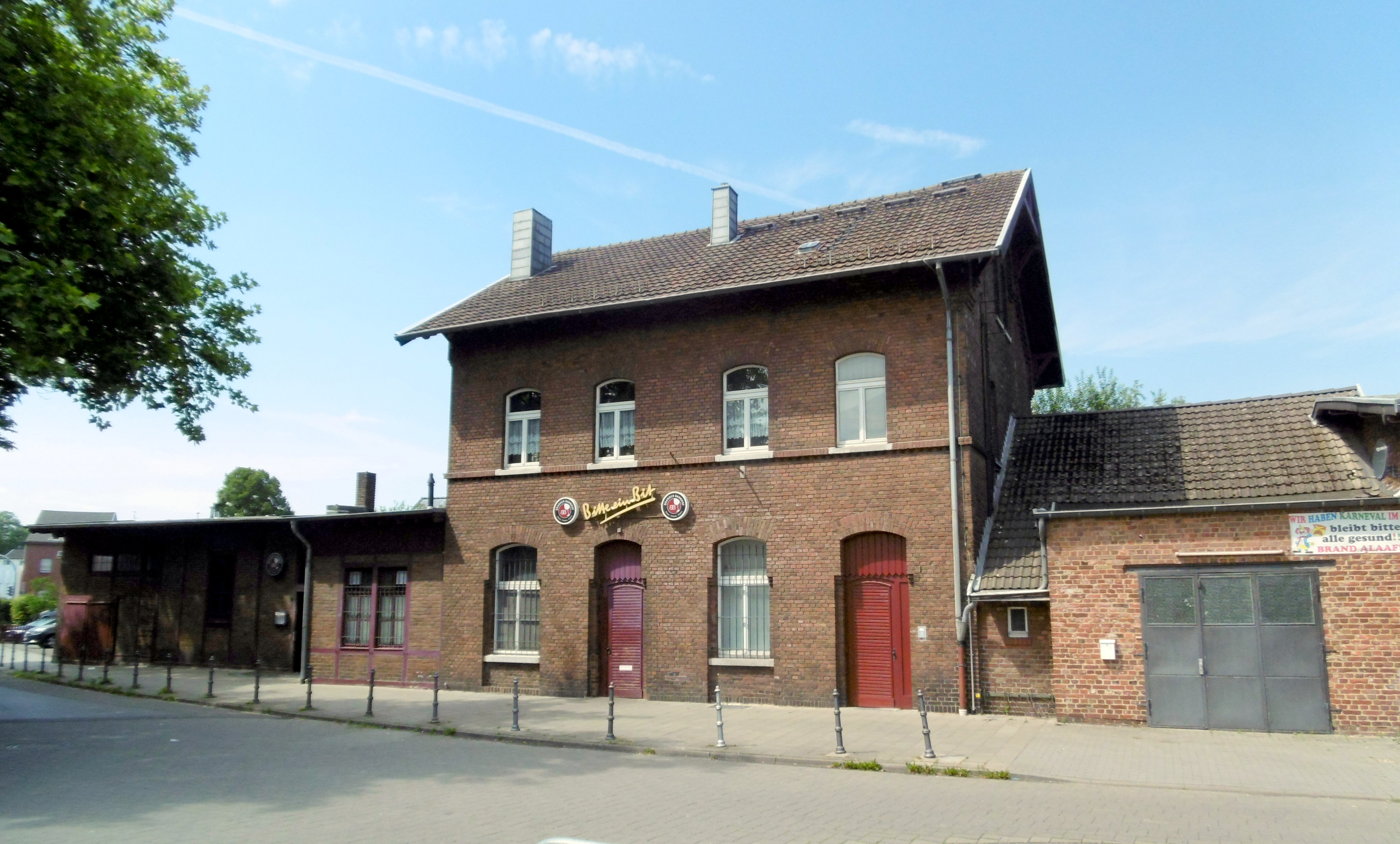
Former train station on the Vennbahn

Between 1885 and 1980, the train station in Brand was a stop on the Vennbahn railway line, that connected the Aachen-Rothe Erde station with Troisvierges. It opened 1 December 1885 as the Brand Station and was renamed Brand (Rheinland) in the 1950s. It was located between Trierer Straße and Eckenerstraße, which was spanned by a level crossing. On 29 May 1960 commuter traffic was discontinued at the station, and 1 April 1980 saw the end of freight traffic as well. The tracks between Brand and Kornelimünster were torn up in 1982, while the tracks to Aachen-Rothe Erde were removed in 1985.

The former railway tracks have been paved and are now used as a bike and pedestrian path, known as the Vennbahnweg. The station building was eventually remodeled and hosts a restaurant.

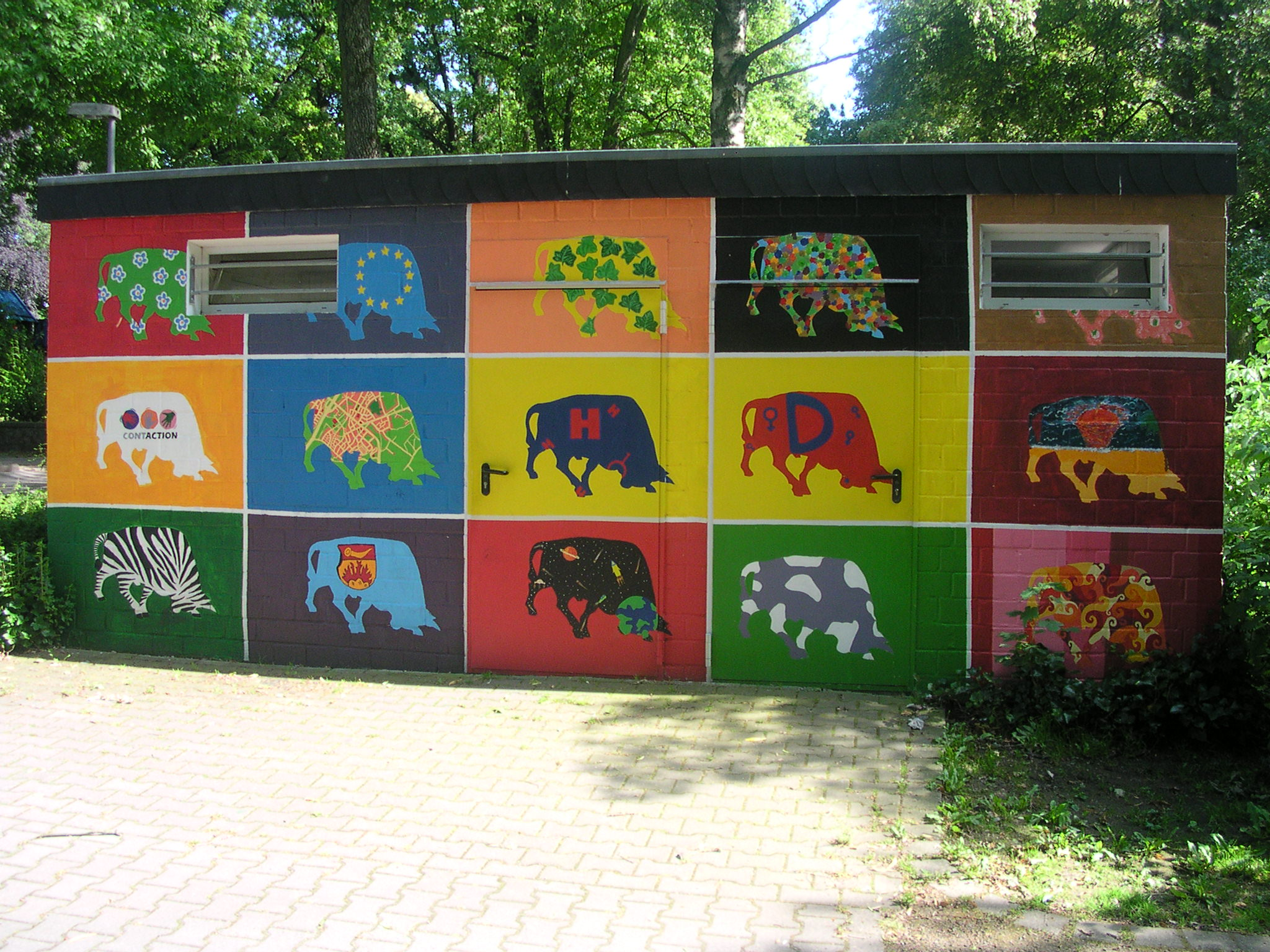
The Brand Bull painted on a bathroom wall

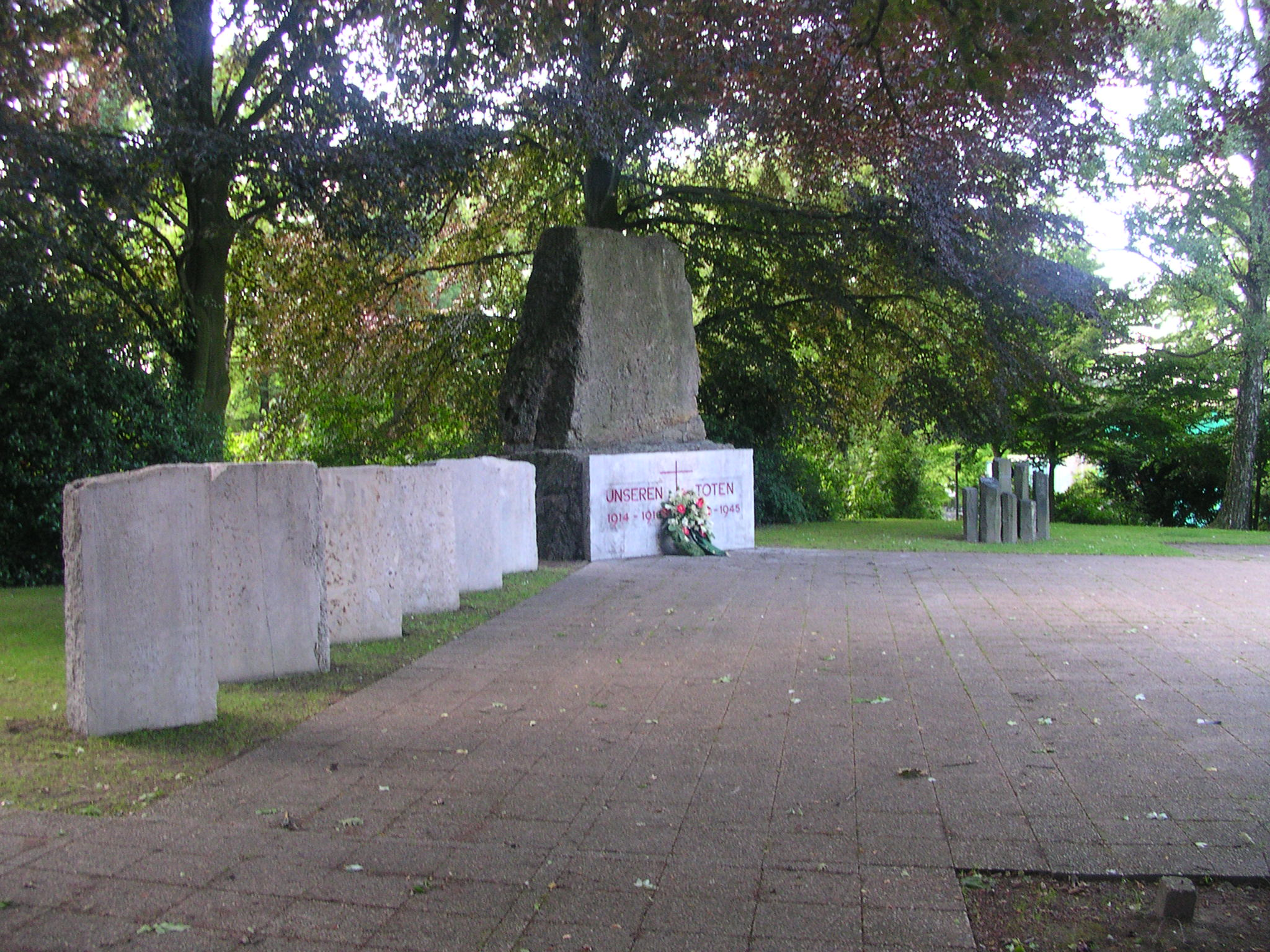
Monument for fallen soldiers of World Wars I and II

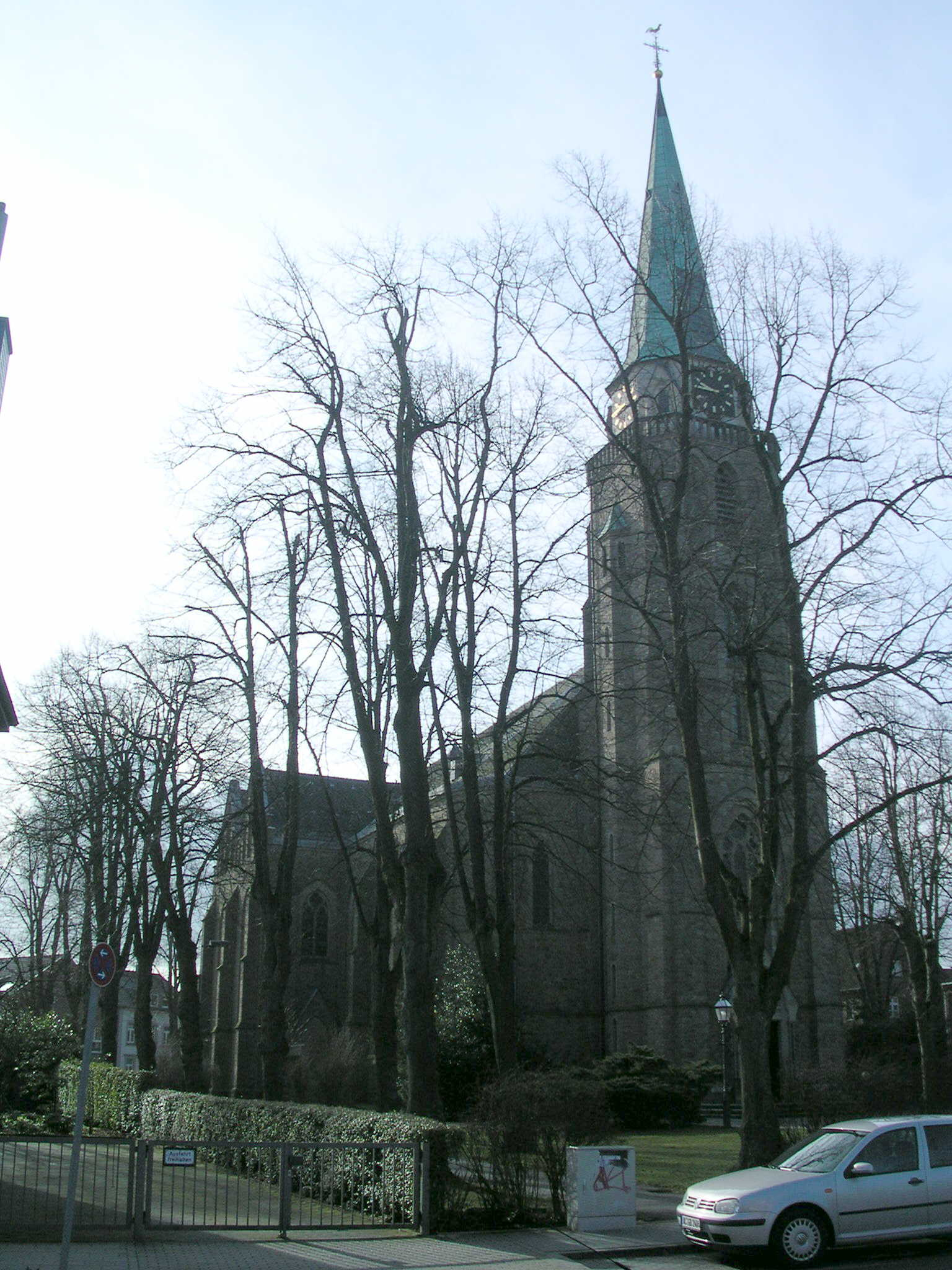
St Donatus Church

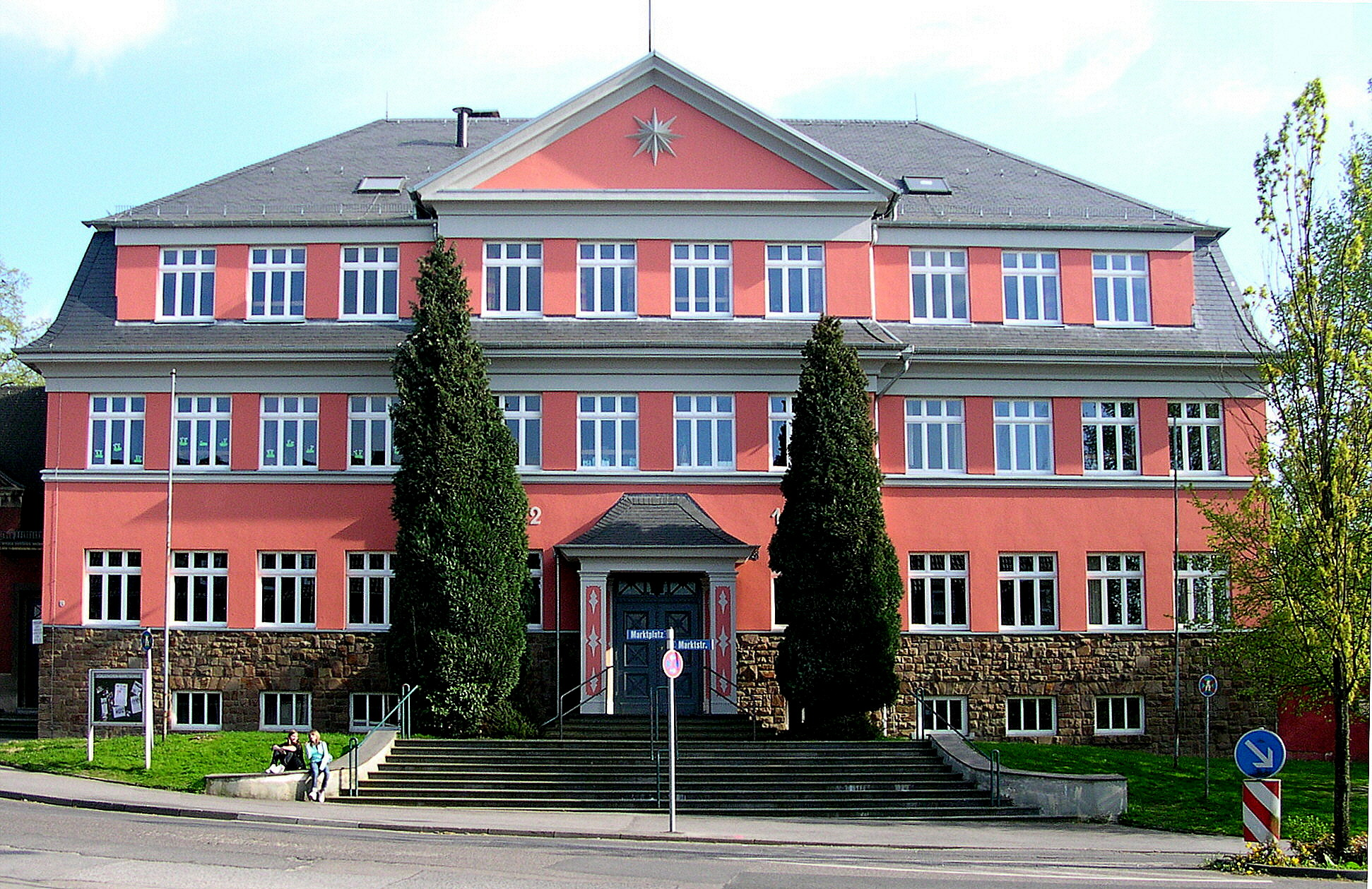
Market School Brand

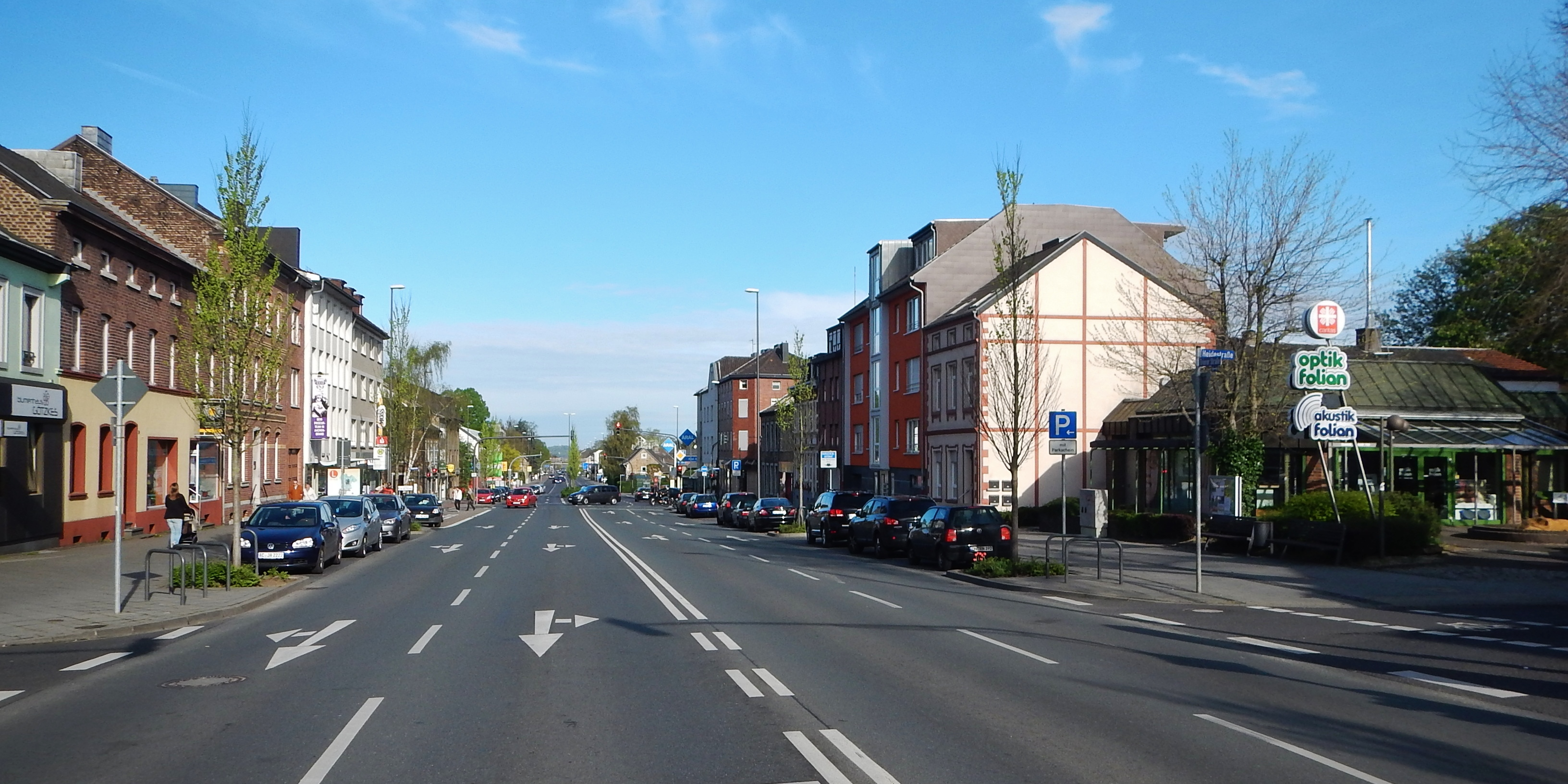
Trierer Straße, the main avenue of Brand, looking towards Aachen

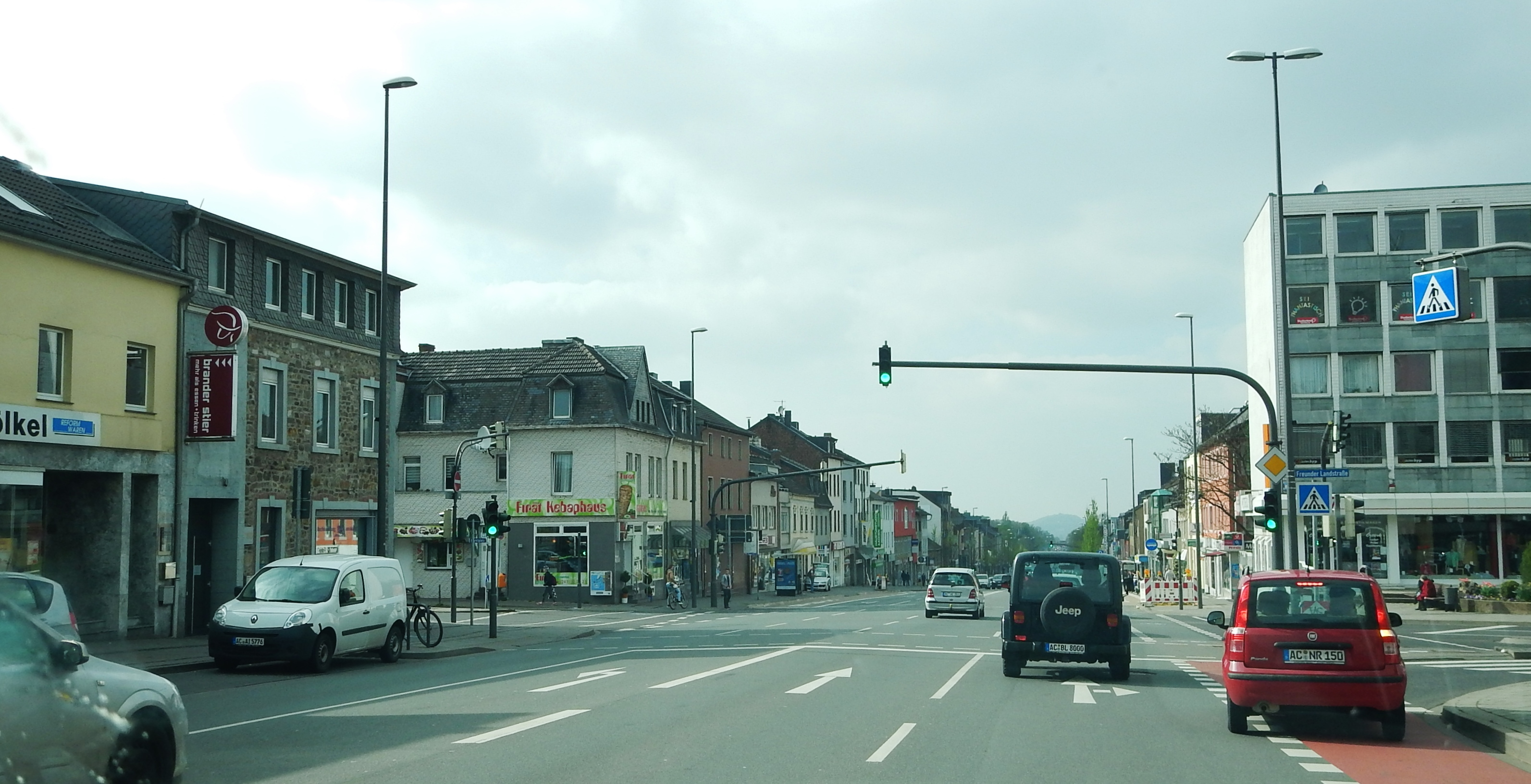
Another view of Trierer Straße, the main avenue of Brand, close to the Marktplatz (on the left), looking towards Aachen

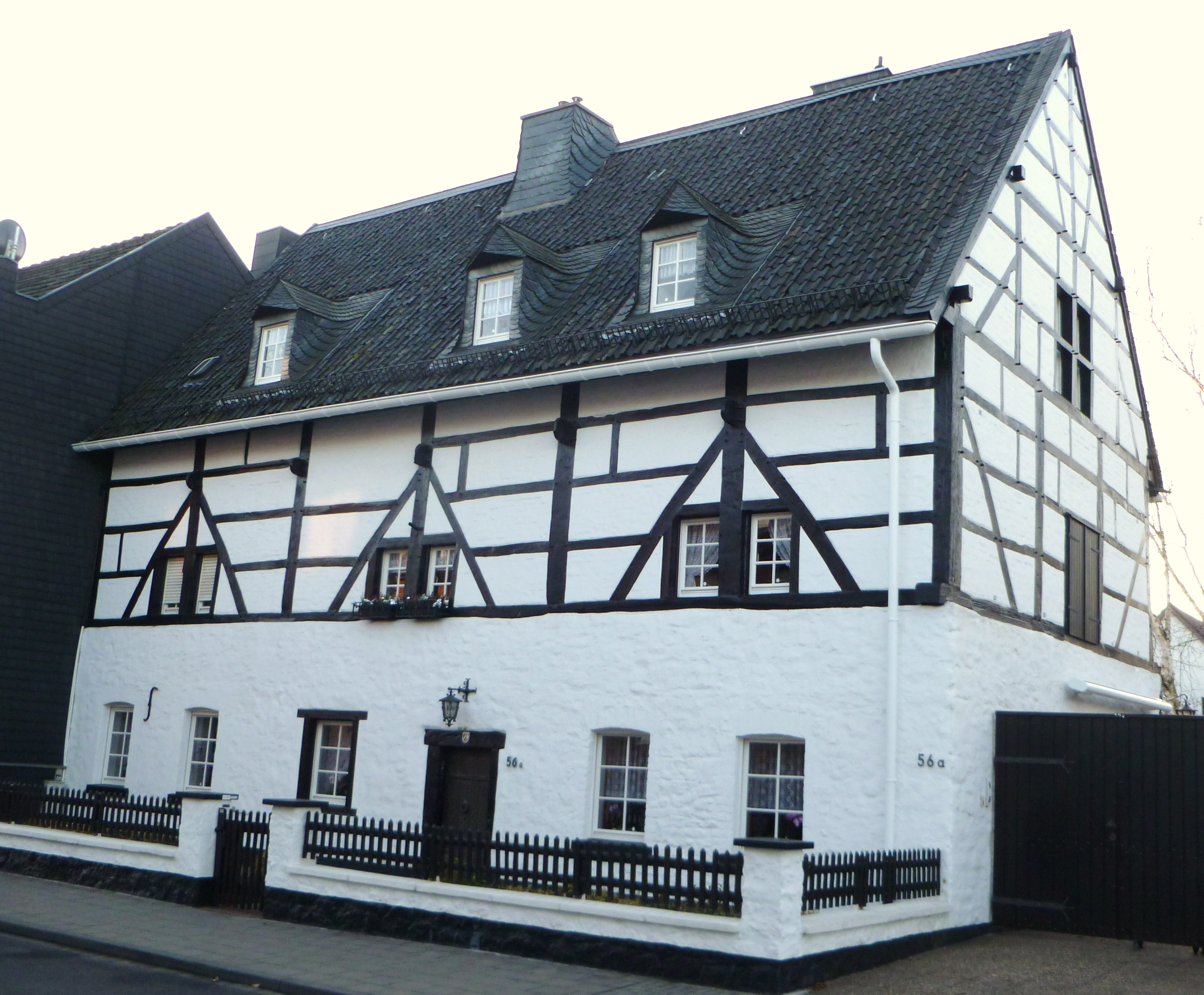
A half timbered house in Schroufstraße, Brand

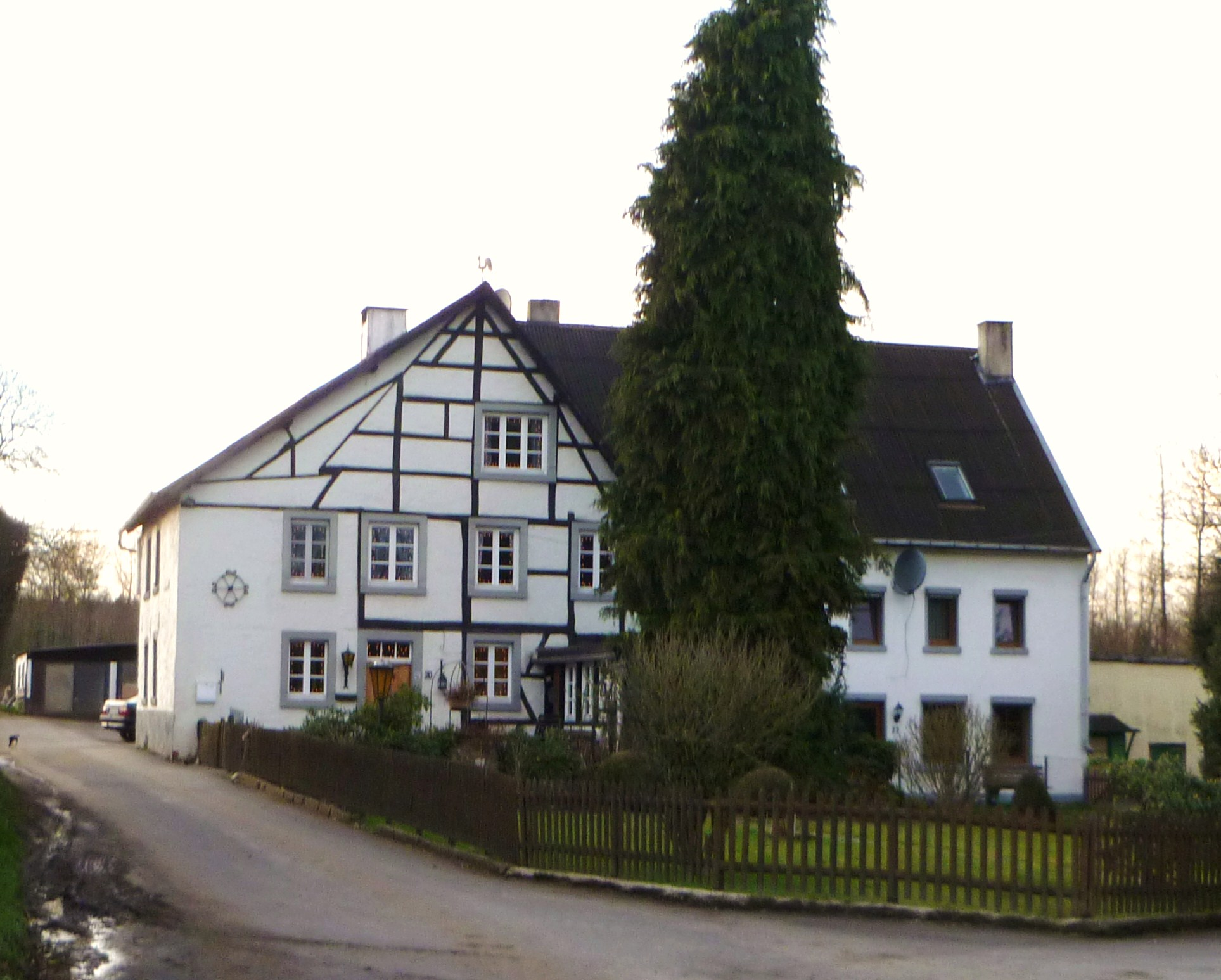
A half timbered house in Pützgasse, Brand

== Bibliography ==
- Kratz, Christian: St. Donatus in Aachen-Brand. Einhard-Verlag, Aachen 2000.
- Jeuckens, Robert: Geschichte von Gemeinde und Pfarre Brand. Veröffentlichungen des Bischöflichen Diözesanarchivs Aachen, Bd. 21, Aachen 1954
- Heimatblätter des Landkreises Aachen. Jg. 6, Nr. 3, Juli 1936
- Brand. Ein Ort verändert sich. Hrsg. vom Bürgerverein Brand e. V., Aachen 1985
- Brand Heimatkundliche Blätter 1, 1990 ff.
