= Wiltz (river) =

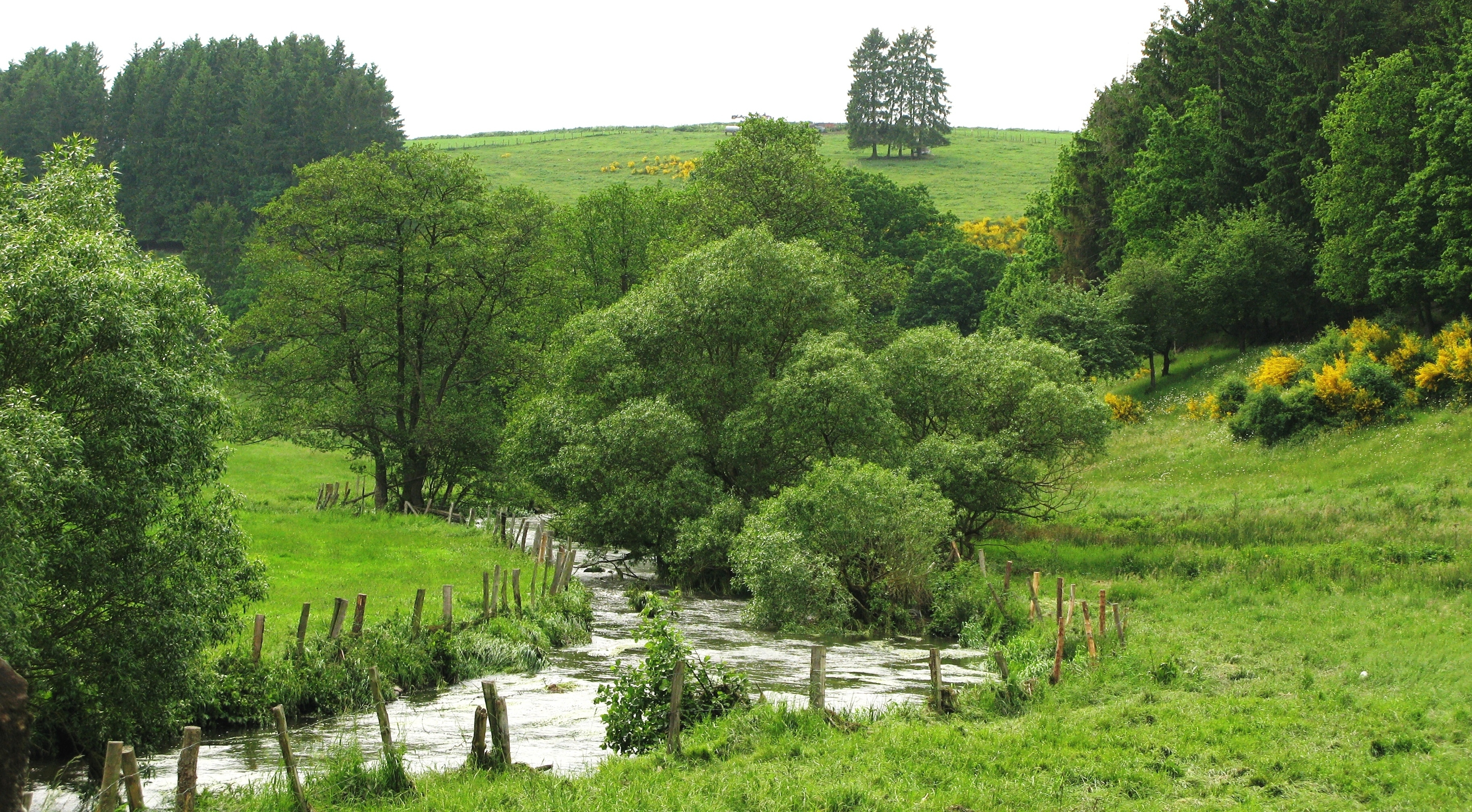

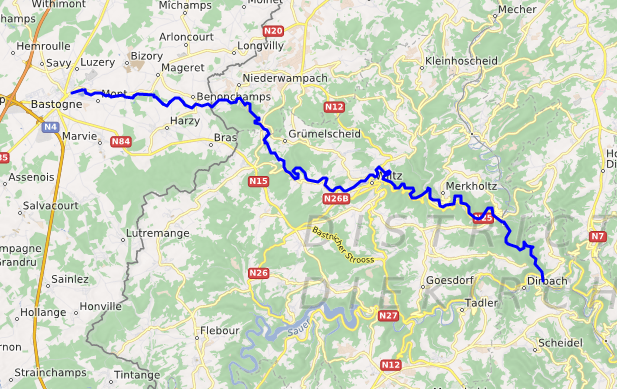

Location
- Country: Belgium, Luxembourg

Physical characteristics
- Source
  - location: Bastogne
- Mouth: Sauer
  - location: Goebelsmuhle
  - coordinates: 49.9236°N 6.0491°E
- Length: 42 km (26 mi)

Basin features
- Progression: Sauer→ Moselle→ Rhine→ North Sea

The Wiltz (German pronunciation: [ˈvɪlts]; Luxembourgish: Wolz [volts]) is a river flowing through Belgium and Luxembourg, joining the Sauer at Goebelsmuhle. The Clerve is a tributary of the Wiltz.
