= Brand Forest Military Training Area =

Training grounds for the German army

- Standortübungsplatz Brander Wald zwischen Brand und Münsterbusch
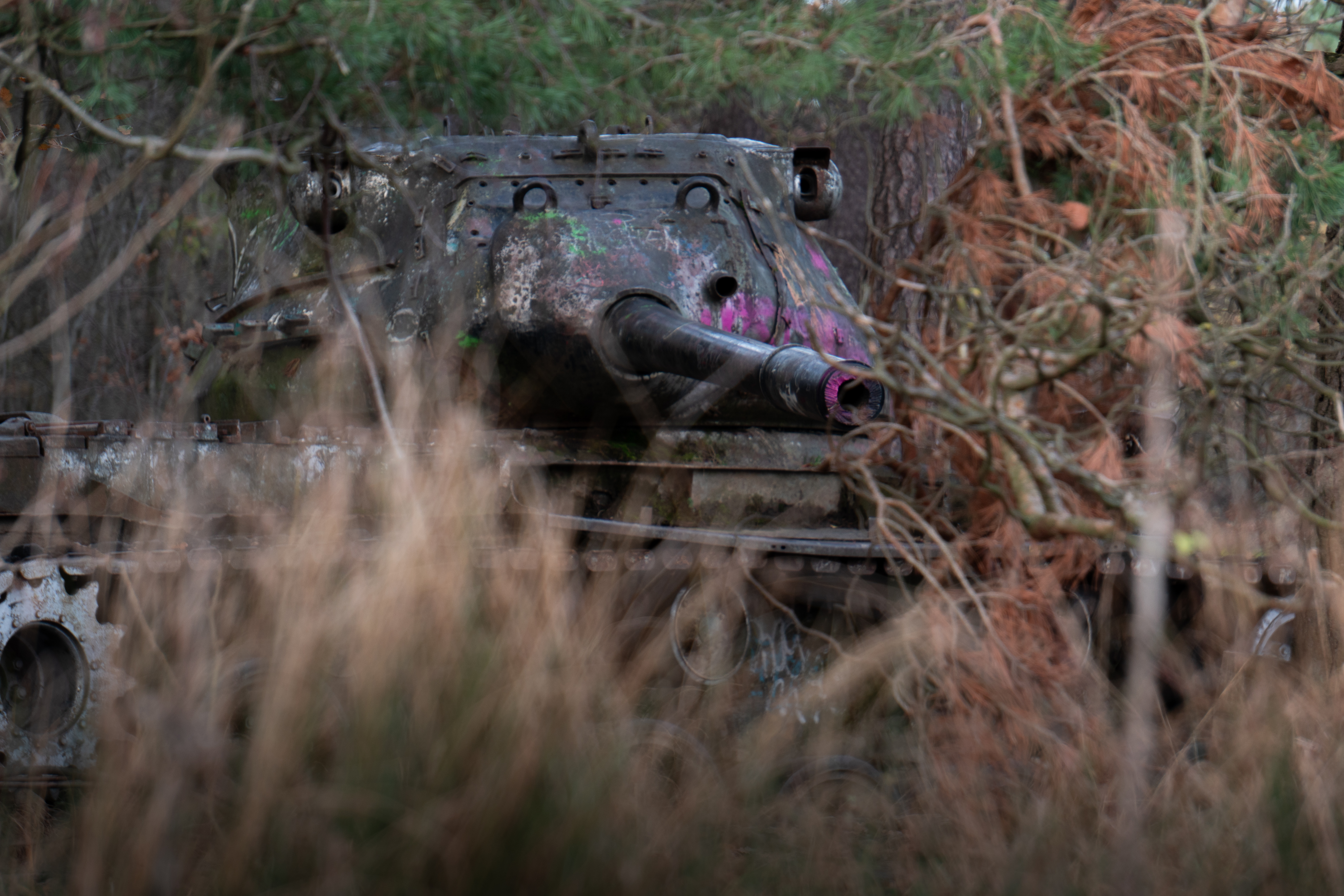
- An M47 Patton tank, that is still present in the area

- Location within North Rhine-Westphalia
- Location: Aachen (Brand), Stolberg (Münsterbusch), North Rhine-Westphalia, Germany
- Coordinates: 50.803°N 6.121°E
- Area: 224.9 ha (556 acres)
- Designation: Military training area; parts are Natura 2000 / Fauna‑Flora-Habitat site
- Established: 1937 (as military training area)
- Governing body: Bundeswehr (German Armed Forces)

Brand Forest Military Training Area (German: Standortübungsplatz Brander Wald zwischen Brand und Münsterbusch) is a 224.9 hectare military training ground located between the Brand district of Aachen and Münsterbusch in Stolberg, North Rhine‑Westphalia, Germany. It serves as training ground for the Bundeswehr, the German Red Cross, the THW, and the Feuerwehr.

The public is permitted to enter the ground except during the week from 7 am to 5 pm. Many walking and biking paths can be found throughout the area.

== Nature reserve ==
Large parts of the training area lie within the Brander Wald and Münsterbusch nature reserves and are designated as a protected Fauna‑Flora-Habitat (FFH) region.

== History ==
Historically, the site bears remnants of the Siegfried Line (Westwall) fortifications. Concrete Dragon's teeth tank obstacles from 1938, twelve ruined bunkers, and shooting ranges dating back to its establishment in 1937 are still visible.

After World War II the training grounds continued being used by both the Belgian Armed Forces and the Bundeswehr up to this day. Most notably, three M47 Patton tanks and one M41 Walker Bulldog tank remain on the grounds and serve as popular photography spots.

The eastern section of the area is also archaeologically significant, with traces of Roman-era mining (pingen), and is protected as a monument.
