= Basbellain =

Village in Troisvierges, Luxembourg

Coordinates: 50°09′N 5°59′E

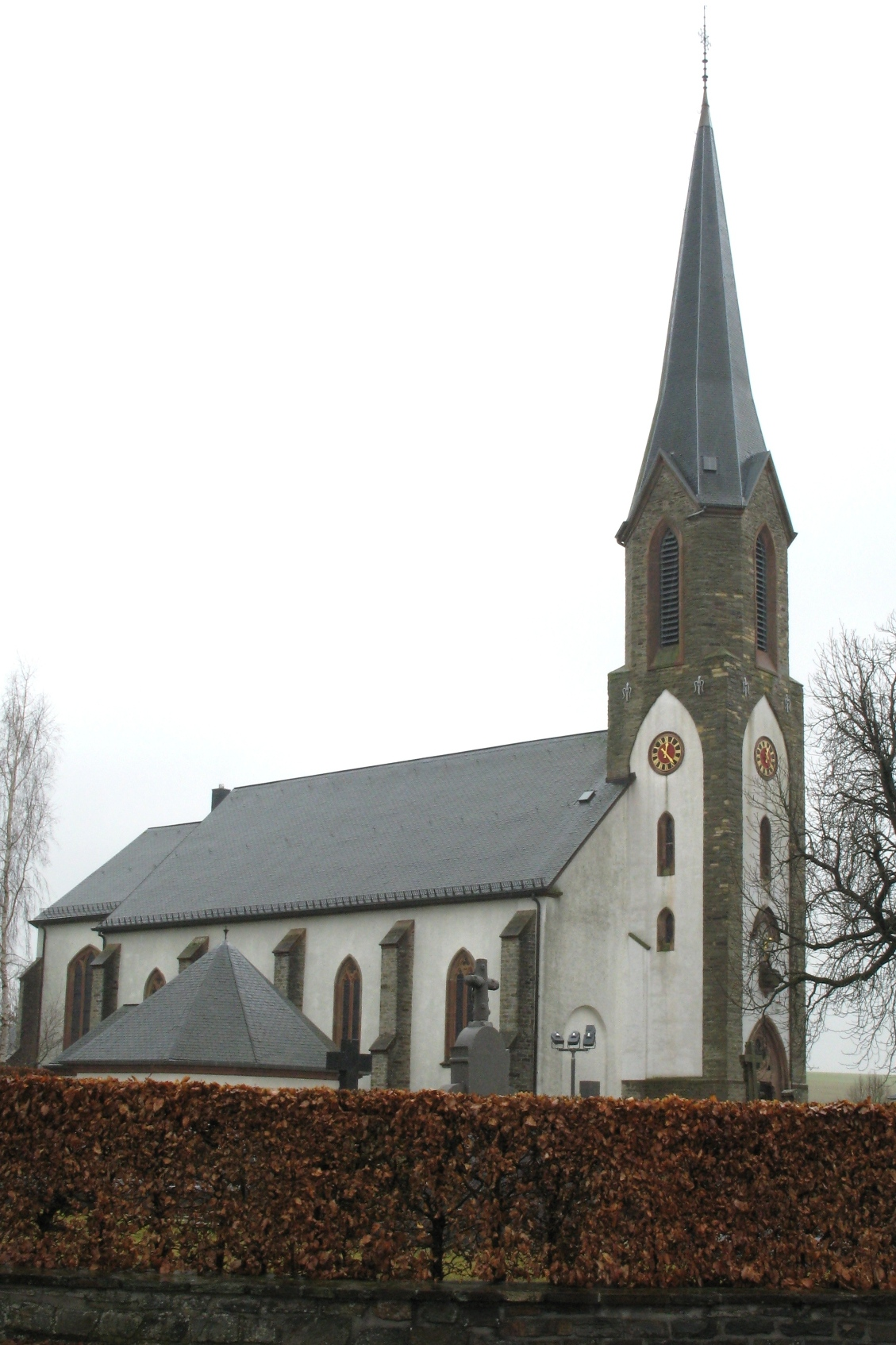

Basbellain (French pronunciation: [babelɛ̃], Luxembourgish: Kierchen [ˈkiːɐ̯ɕən], locally: Kirchen [ˈkiχɕən]; German: Niederbesslingen [ˈniːdɐˌbɛslɪŋən]) is a village in the commune of Troisvierges, in northern Luxembourg. As of September 2026, the village had a population of 180.

Basbellain gave its name to the commune of Troisvierges from 1795 until 1 January 1909, when the commune was given its current name, after its largest town.

== Geography ==
Located in the extreme north of Luxembourg, Basbellain is bounded on the west by the Belgian border.

== History ==
Basbellain is considered one of the earliest settlements in Luxembourg. Belsonancum, which is Bellain in Latin, appears in a Merovingian document in the year 585. Since the 14th century, the locality has been split into two: Basbellain and Hautbellain.

== Church ==
The church, surrounded by a large cemetery, still occupies a dominant position in the configuration of the village. This church, the church of St. Michel, is credited with the spread of Christianity in the Ardennes. Twenty vinages, ancient baronial duties on wines, belonged to the mother parish. Today, the Luxembourgish name "Kiirchen" testifies to this former privileged position.

The rectory of the parish is now private property, and religious life is incorporated into an association between five parishes.
