= Hautbellain =

Coordinates: 50°09′N 5°59′E

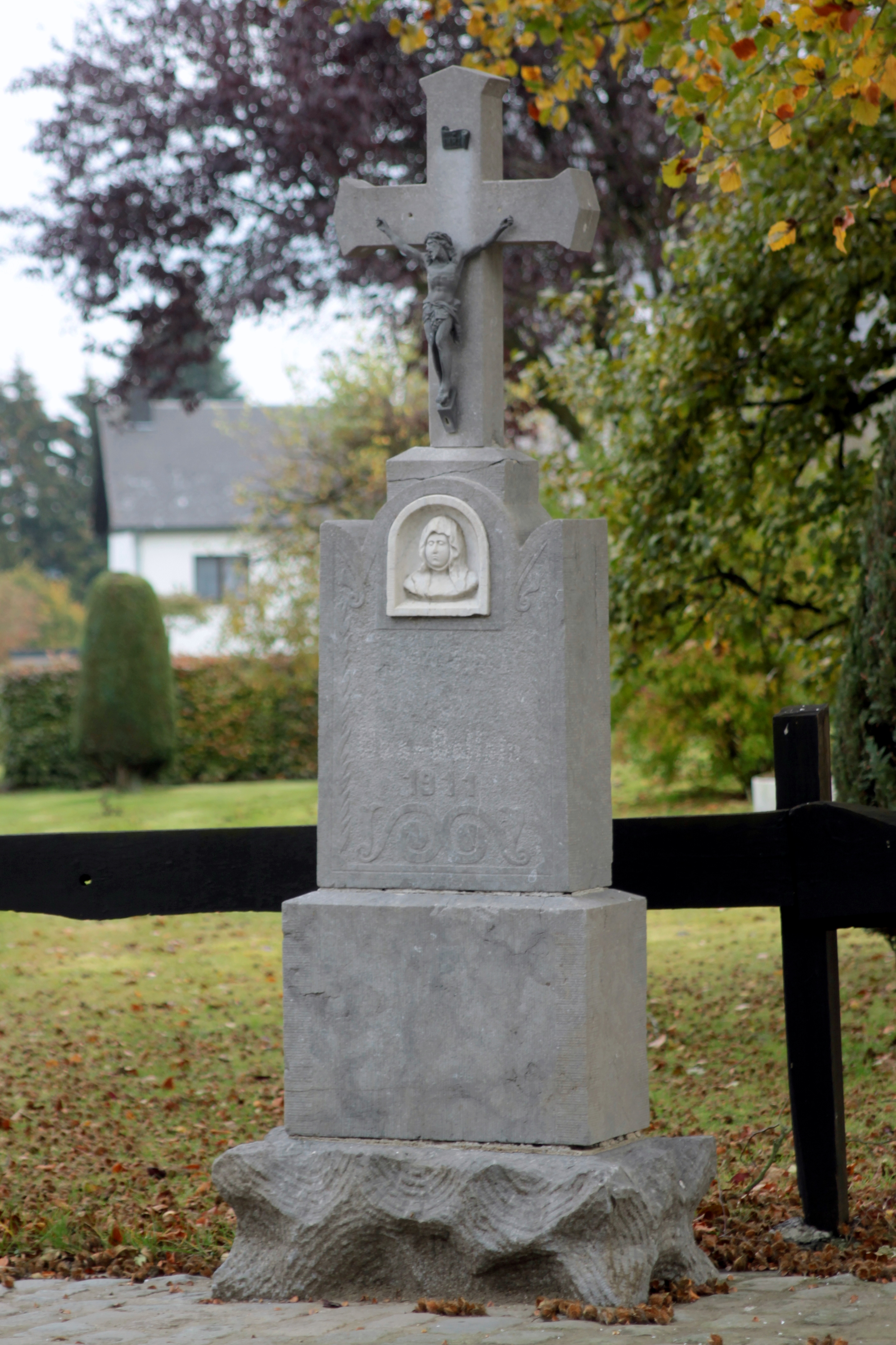
A chapel in Beesslek

Hautbellain (French pronunciation: [obelɛ̃], German: Oberbesslingen [ˈoːbɐˌbɛslɪŋən], both lit. 'Upper Bellain/Besslingen', in contrast to "Lower Bellain/Besslingen"; Luxembourgish: Beesslek) is a village in the commune of Troisvierges, in northern Luxembourg. As of September 2026, the village has a population of 227.
