= Wilwerdange =

Town in the commune of Troisvierges, in Luxembourg

Coordinates: 50°08′N 6°01′E

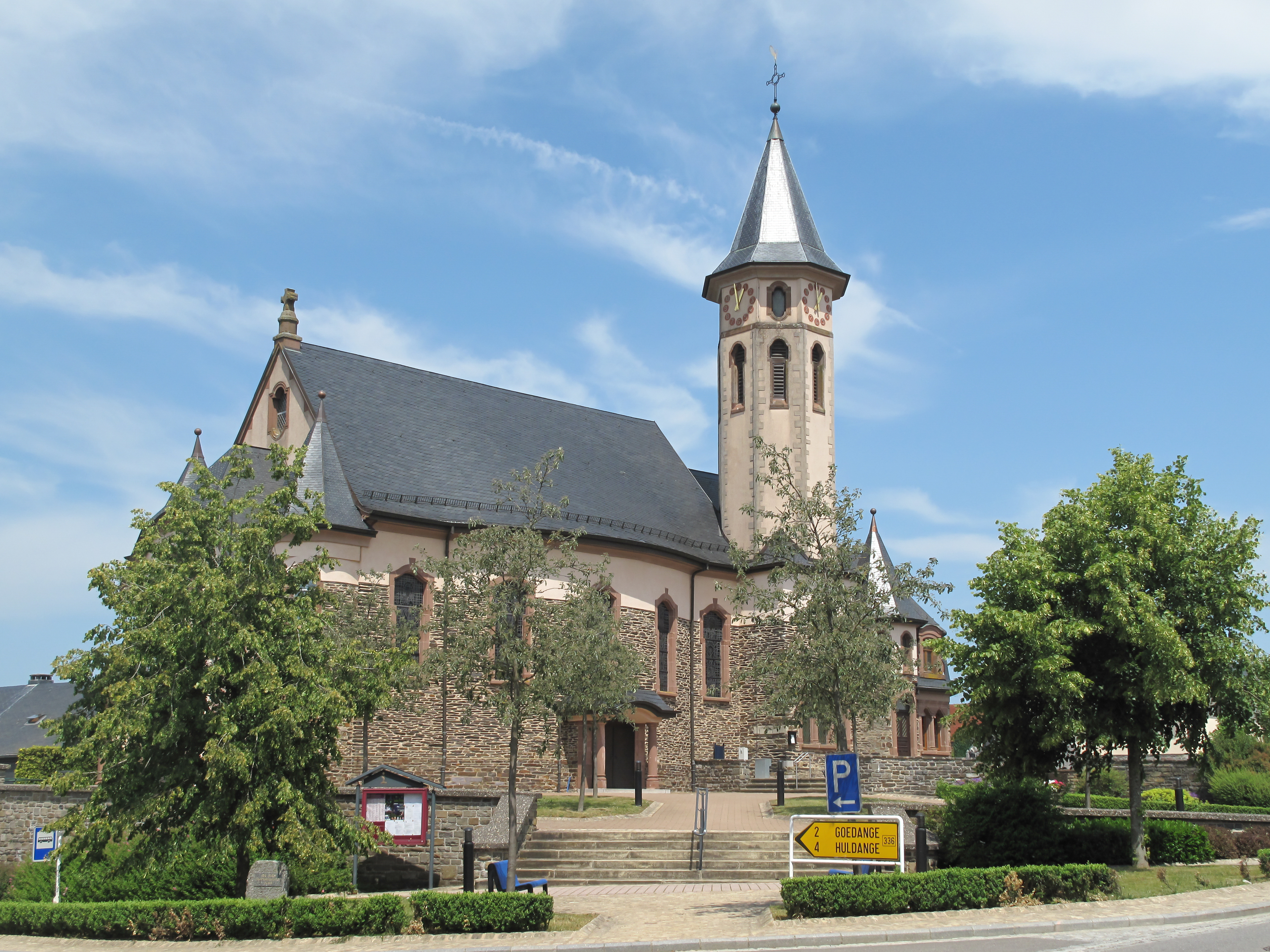
Wilwerdange, church

Wilwerdange (Luxembourgish: Wilwerdang, German: Wilwerdingen) is a small town in the commune of Troisvierges, in northern Luxembourg. As of September 2026, the town has a population of 435.
