= Kneiff =

Hill in the commune of Troisvierges, Luxembourg

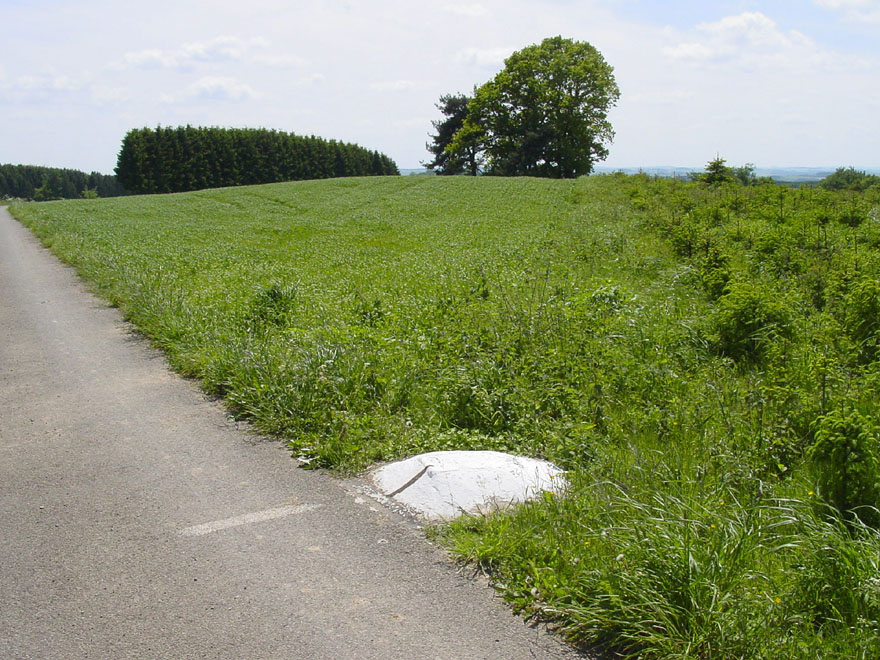
- The summit of Kneiff

Highest point
- Elevation: 560 m (1,840 ft)
- Listing: Country high point
- Coordinates: 50°9′27.7″N 6°2′13.8″E

Geography
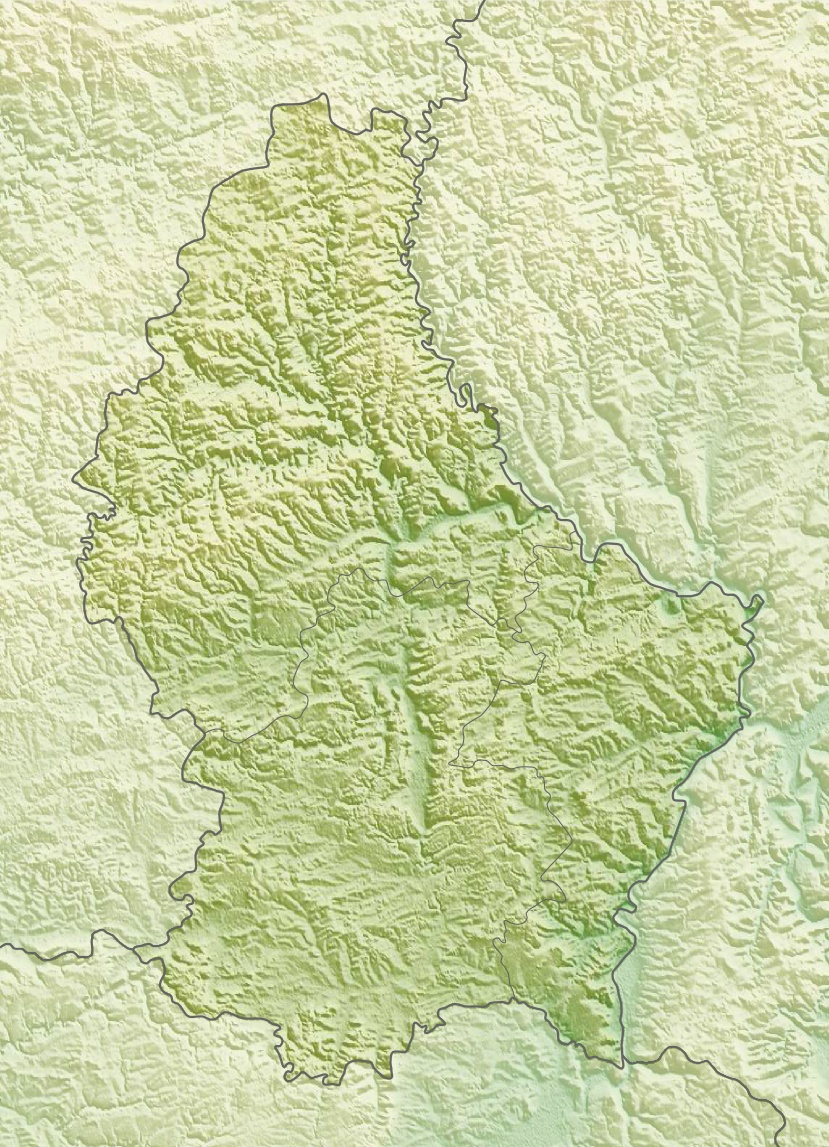
- Location within Luxembourg
- Location: Troisvierges, Luxembourg

Geology
- Mountain type: Hill

Kneiff is a hill in the Ardennes, in the commune of Troisvierges, in northern Luxembourg, near the tripoint shared with Belgium and Germany. At 560 metres (1,840 ft), it is the highest point in the country; being 1 metre (3 ft 3 in) taller than Buurgplaatz, which was previously considered the highest point until 1997. It lies close to the town of Wilwerdange.
