= Buurgplaatz =

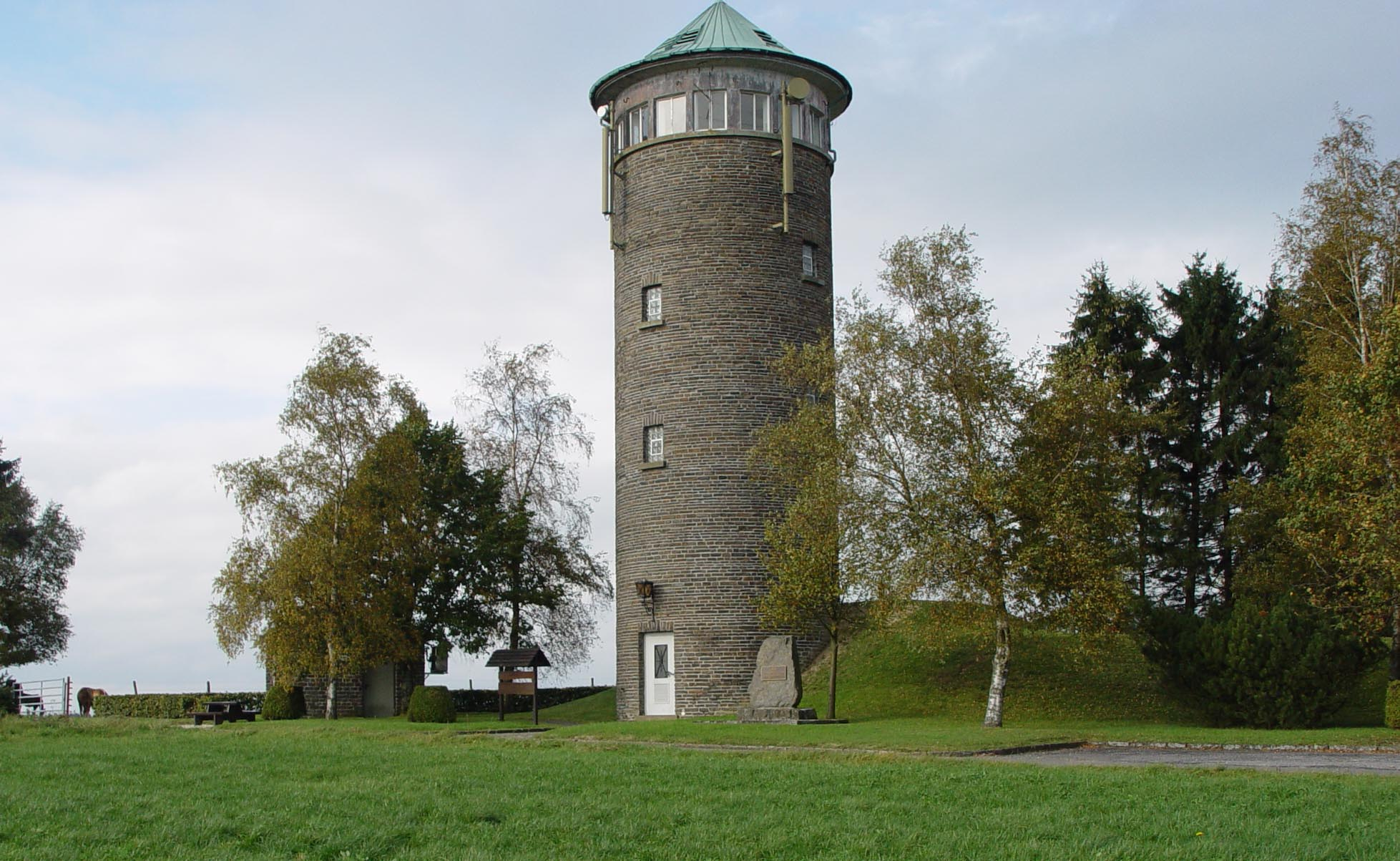
Tower at the Buurgplaatz

Buurgplaatz (alternate names: Buergplaatz, Burrigplatz, Burgplatz, Buergplaz zu Huldang) is a hill in the commune of Troisvierges, in northern Luxembourg. The 559-metre-high (1,834 ft) summit lies within the Éislek region at 50.1615°N 6.0281°E.

In 1952 the Institut national de l'information géographique et forestière declared Buurgplaatz the highest point in Luxembourg. Previously Napoléonsgaard hill at 547 m (1,795 ft), located in the Canton of Redange, was considered the highest point.

In 1997 Buurgplaatz lost its status as highest point after GPS survey determined Kneiff at 560 m (1,840 ft) was 1 metre (3 ft 3 in) higher.

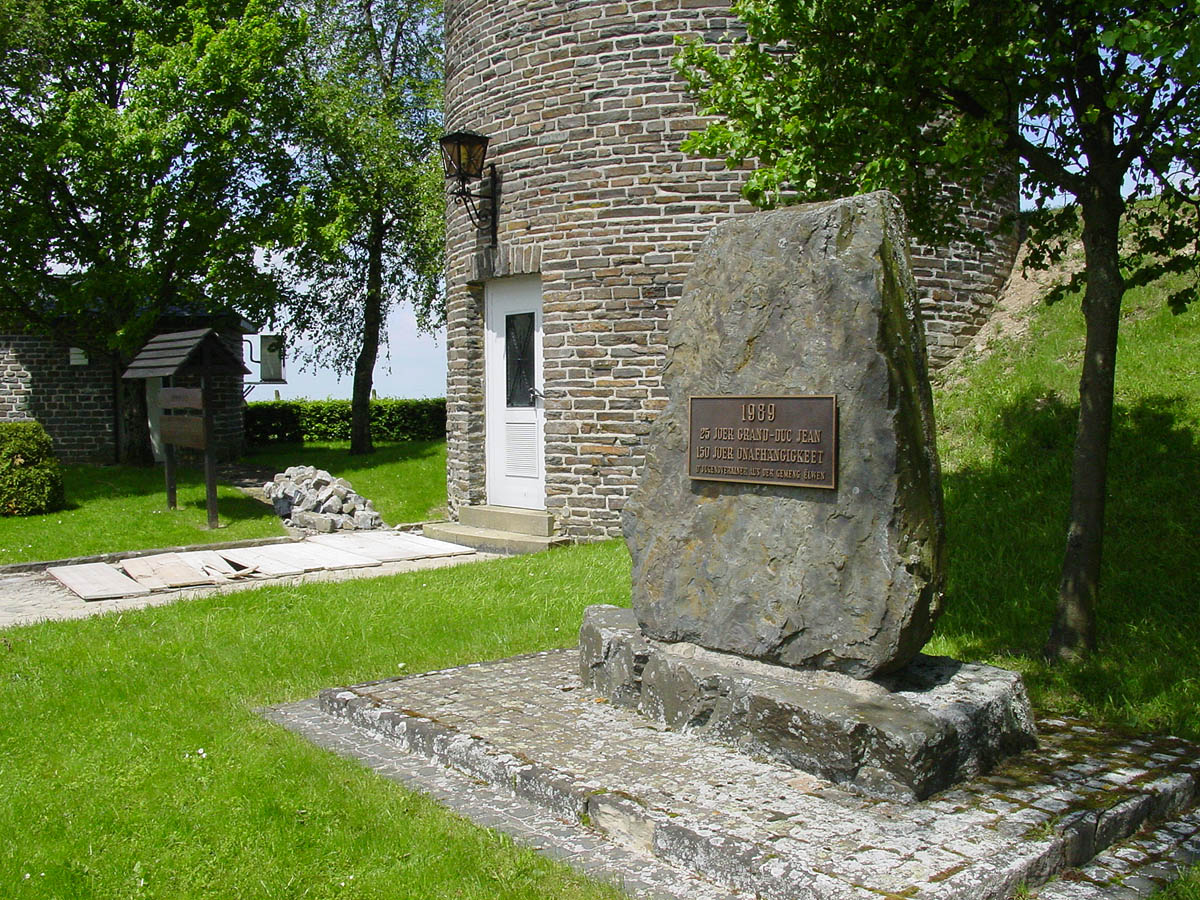
Stone and base of the tower

The declaration plaque on the summit remains and Buurgplaatz may still be erroneously considered the highest point in Luxembourg.
