= Troisvierges =

Troisvierges Ëlwen (Luxembourgish) Ulflingen (German)
- Commune
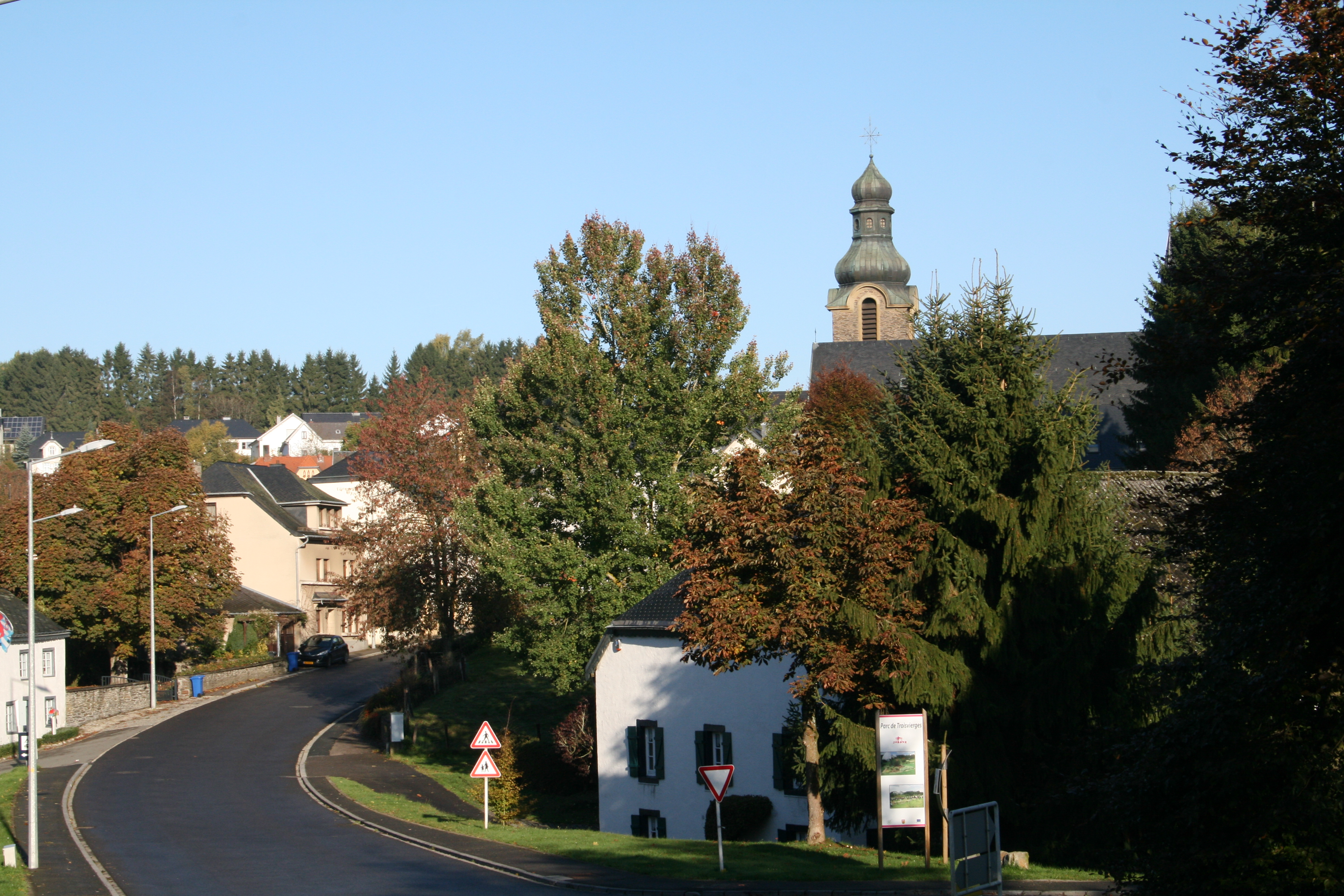
- Binsfeld street

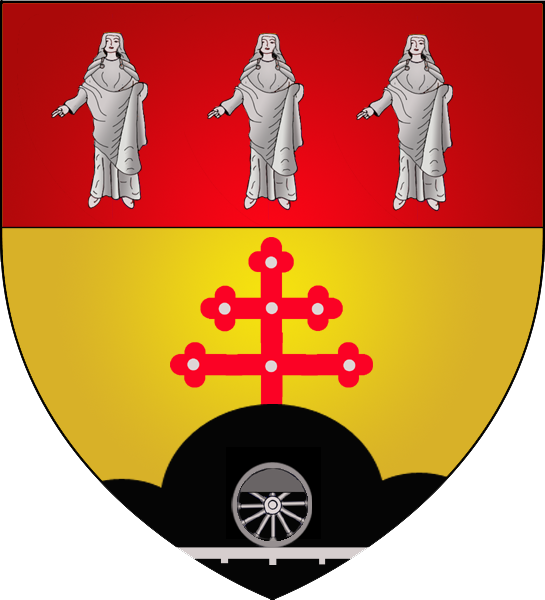
- Coat of arms

- Map of Luxembourg with Troisvierges highlighted in orange, and the canton in dark red
- Coordinates: 50.1167°N 6°E
- Country: Luxembourg
- Canton: Clervaux

Government
  - Mayor: Edy Mertens

Area
  - Total: 37.86 km^{2} (14.62 sq mi)
  - Rank: 15th of 100
- Highest elevation: 560 m (1,840 ft)
  - Rank: 1st of 100
- Lowest elevation: 407 m (1,335 ft)
  - Rank: 102nd of 100

Population (2026)
  - Total: 3,753
  - Rank: 65th of 100
  - Density: 99.13/km^{2} (256.7/sq mi)
  - Rank: 71st of 100
- Time zone: UTC+1 (CET)
  - Summer (DST): UTC+2 (CEST)
- LAU 2: LU0000504
- Website: troisvierges.lu

Troisvierges (French: [tʁwɑvjɛʁʒ]; Luxembourgish: Ëlwen [ˈəlvən]; German: Ulflingen [ˈʊlflɪŋən]) is a commune with town status in northern Luxembourg, in the canton of Clervaux. Troisvierges is both the northernmost and highest commune of Luxembourg, as the two highest hills in the country, the Kneiff (560 m) and Buurgplaatz (559 m), are located in the commune.

As of September 2026, the town of Troisvierges, which lies in the south of the commune, has a population of 2,041. Other towns within the commune include Basbellain, Drinklange, Hautbellain, Huldange, and Wilwerdange.

Until 28 December 1908, the commune was known as "Basbellain", after its former administrative centre. On that date, the administrative centre was moved from Basbellain to Troisvierges.

The coat of arms granted to Troisvierges in 1982 shows three virgins, representing Faith, Hope and Charity; a mountain, for the Éislek region; a stylised papal cross from the oldest known document naming the place; and a railway and wheel, for the importance of the railway in the town's development.

== History ==
The first known reference to the place was made in 1353 under its German name Ulflingen. The French name Troisvierges was adopted in the 17th century when Walloon pilgrims started using it to refer to the three virgins Saint Fides, Saint Spes and Saint Caritas. The Franciscan church of Troisvierges was built in 1658. By 1900, most of the local population were railway and customs employees. There were some 1,550 inhabitants in 1910.

Troisvierges is known for being the site of the start of hostilities on the Western Front in the First World War. On 1 August 1914, German soldiers of the 69th Infantry Regiment disembarked at the town's railway station, violating the terms of Germany's use of the railways and hence violating Luxembourg's neutrality. This began a four-year occupation of Luxembourg by German forces.

== Notable people ==
- Nicolas Adames (1813-1887), the first Bishop of Luxembourg.
- Pierre Prüm (1886–1950), politician and jurist, 14th Prime Minister of Luxembourg, 1925/1926.
- Albert Neumann (1899–1976), a Luxembourgish gymnast, competed at the 1924 and 1928 Summer Olympics
- Jean-Pierre Schmitz (1932–2017), a Luxembourgish professional road bicycle racer.

== Population ==
Historical population

Year	Pop.	±%
1821	1,362	—
1851	1,454	+6.8%
1900	2,597	+78.6%
1910	2,779	+7.0%
1922	2,612	−6.0%
1935	2,732	+4.6%

Year	Pop.	±%
1947	2,518	−7.8%
1960	2,006	−20.3%
1970	1,848	−7.9%
1981	1,858	+0.5%
1990	1,916	+3.1%
2000	2,339	+22.1%

Year	Pop.	±%
2005	2,608	+11.5%
2010	2,918	+11.9%
2015	3,039	+4.1%
2020	3,296	+8.5%
2021	3,367	+2.2%

Source data

== Twin towns – sister cities ==
Troisvierges is a member of the Charter of European Rural Communities, a town twinning association across the European Union, along with:

- Bienvenida, Spain
- Bièvre, Belgium
- Bucine, Italy
- (Republic of Ireland) Cashel, Ireland
- Cissé, France
- Desborough, England, United Kingdom
- Esch (Haaren), Netherlands
- Hepstedt, Germany
- Ibănești, Romania
- Kandava (Tukums), Latvia
- Kannus, Finland
- Kolindros, Greece
- Lassee, Austria
- Medzev, Slovakia
- Næstved, Denmark
- Nagycenk, Hungary
- Nadur, Malta
- Ockelbo, Sweden
- Pano Lefkara, Cyprus
- Põlva, Estonia
- Samuel (Soure), Portugal
- Starý Poddvorov, Czech Republic
- Strzyżów, Poland
- Svoge, Bulgaria
- Tisno, Croatia
- Žagarė (Joniškis), Lithuania

== Images ==
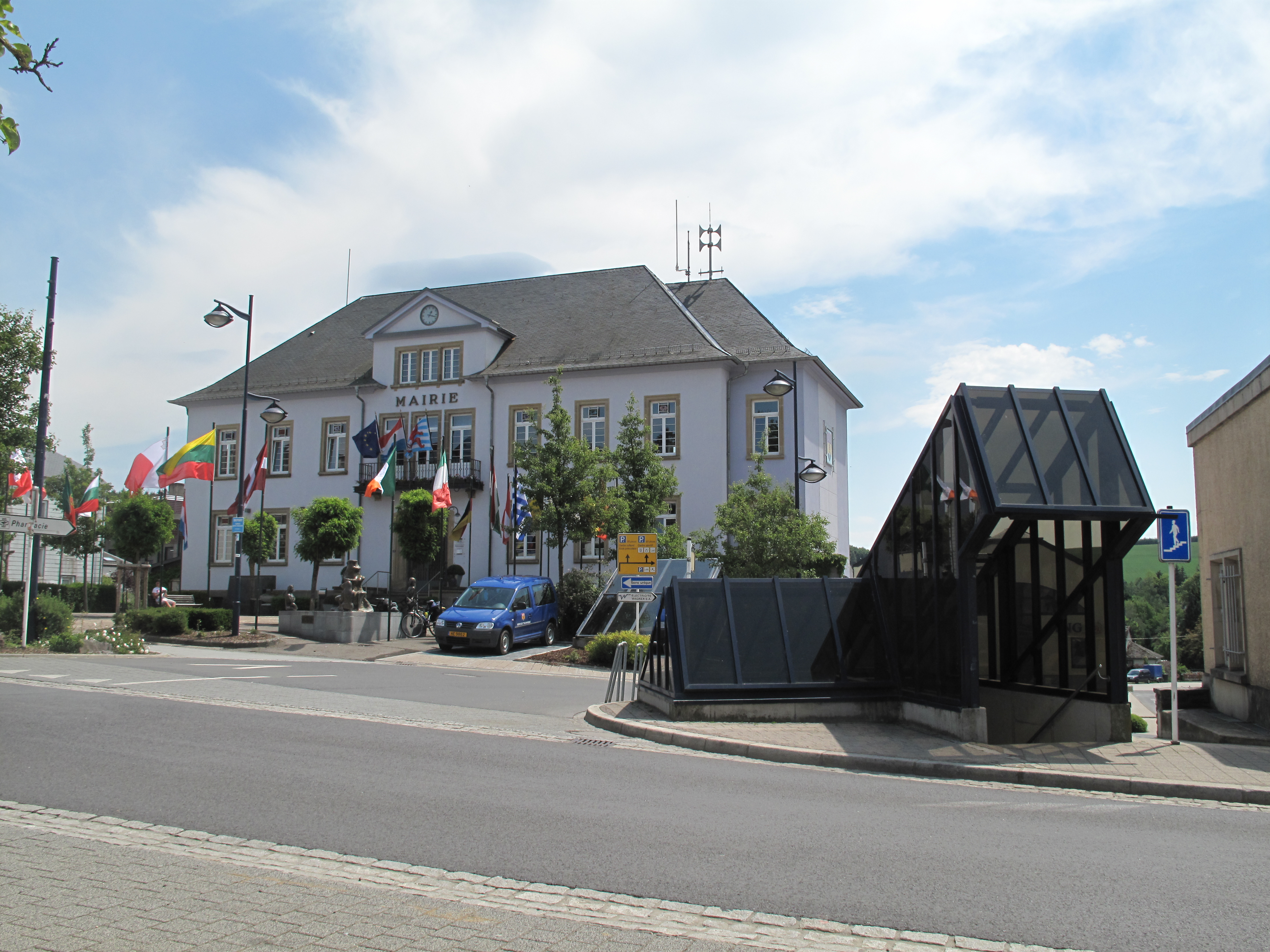
Troisvierges townhall

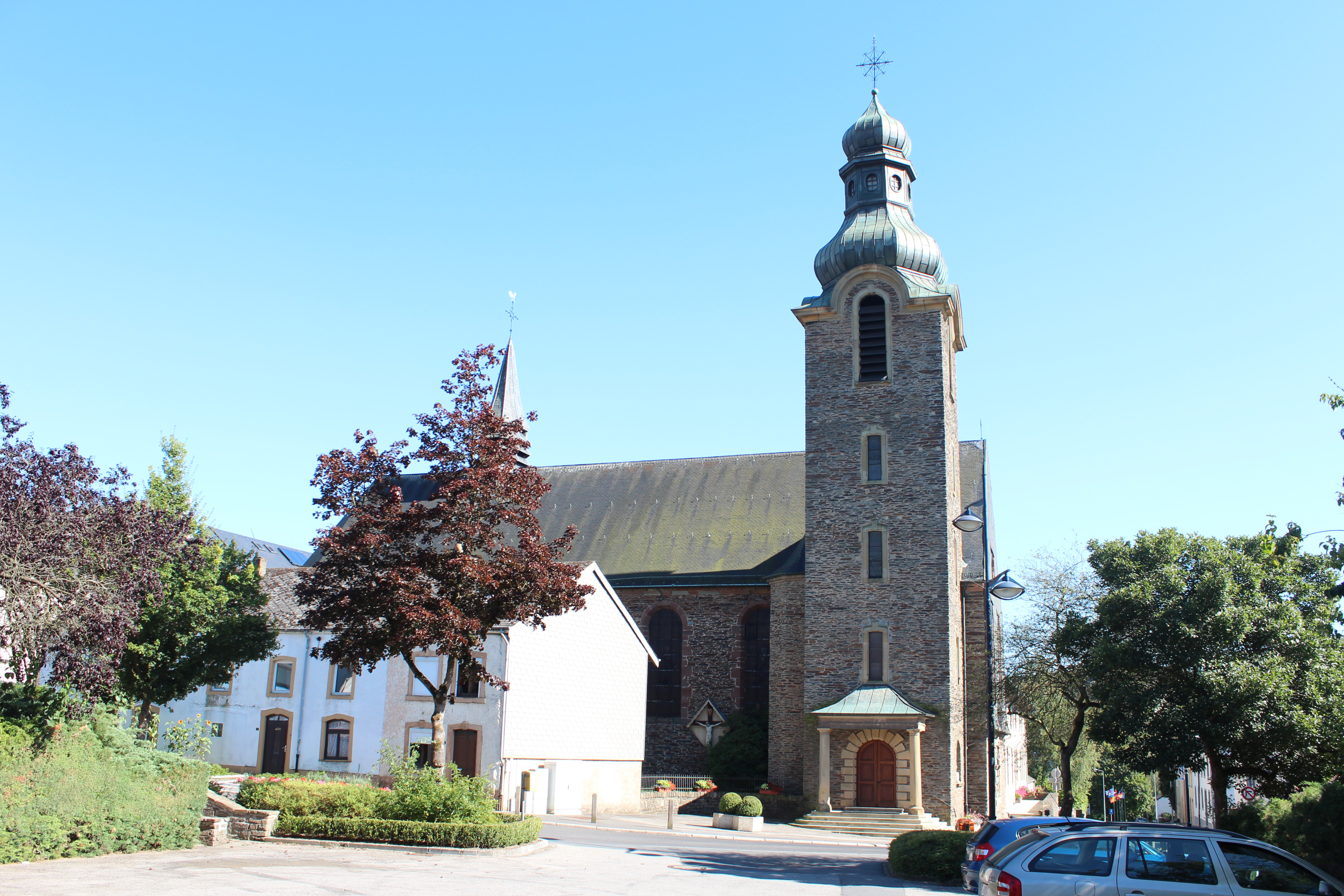
St Andrew's church

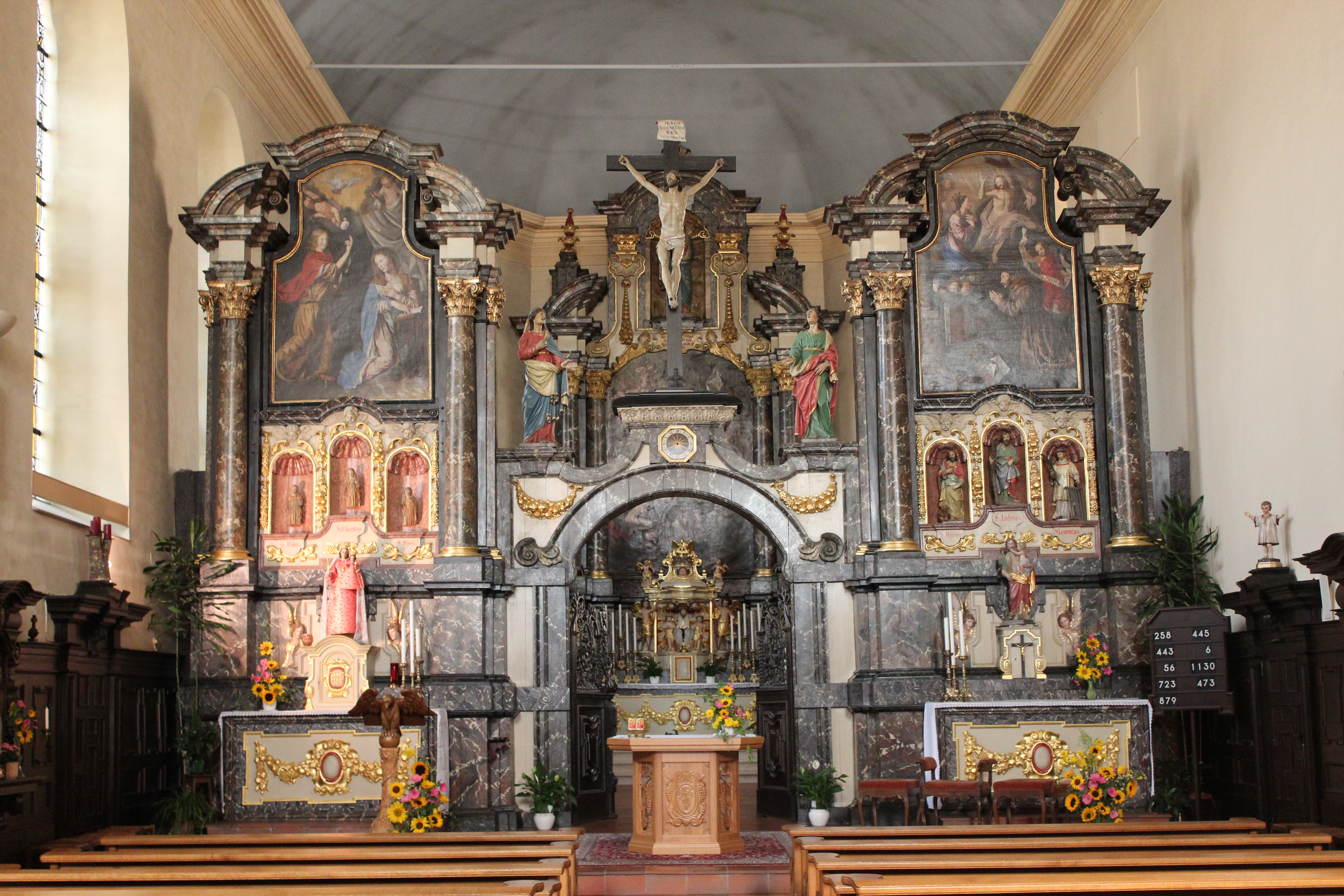
Interior of St Andrew's church

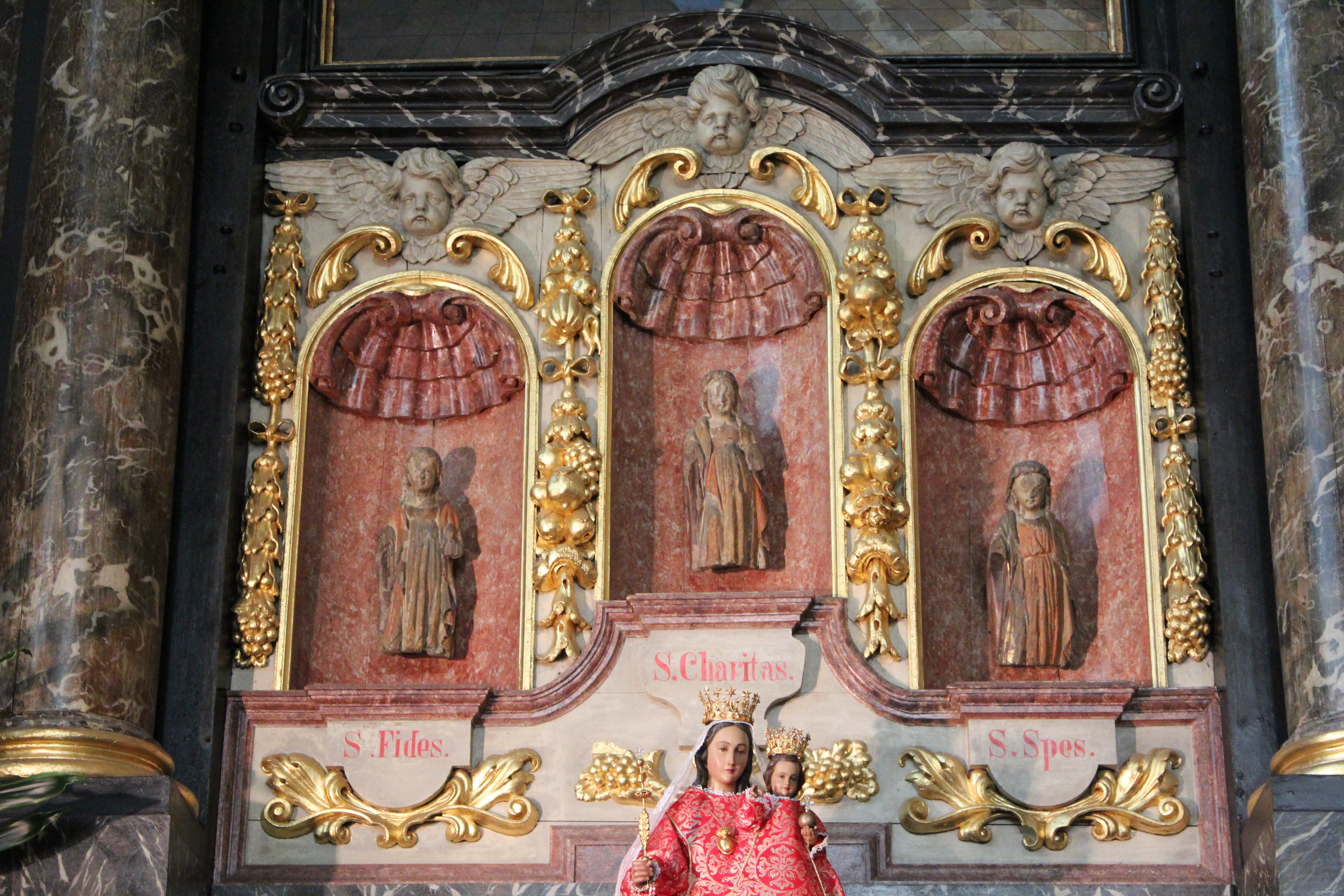
Altar of the Three Virgins, St Andrew's church
