= German occupation of Luxembourg during World War II =

Nazi control of Luxembourg, 1940–1945

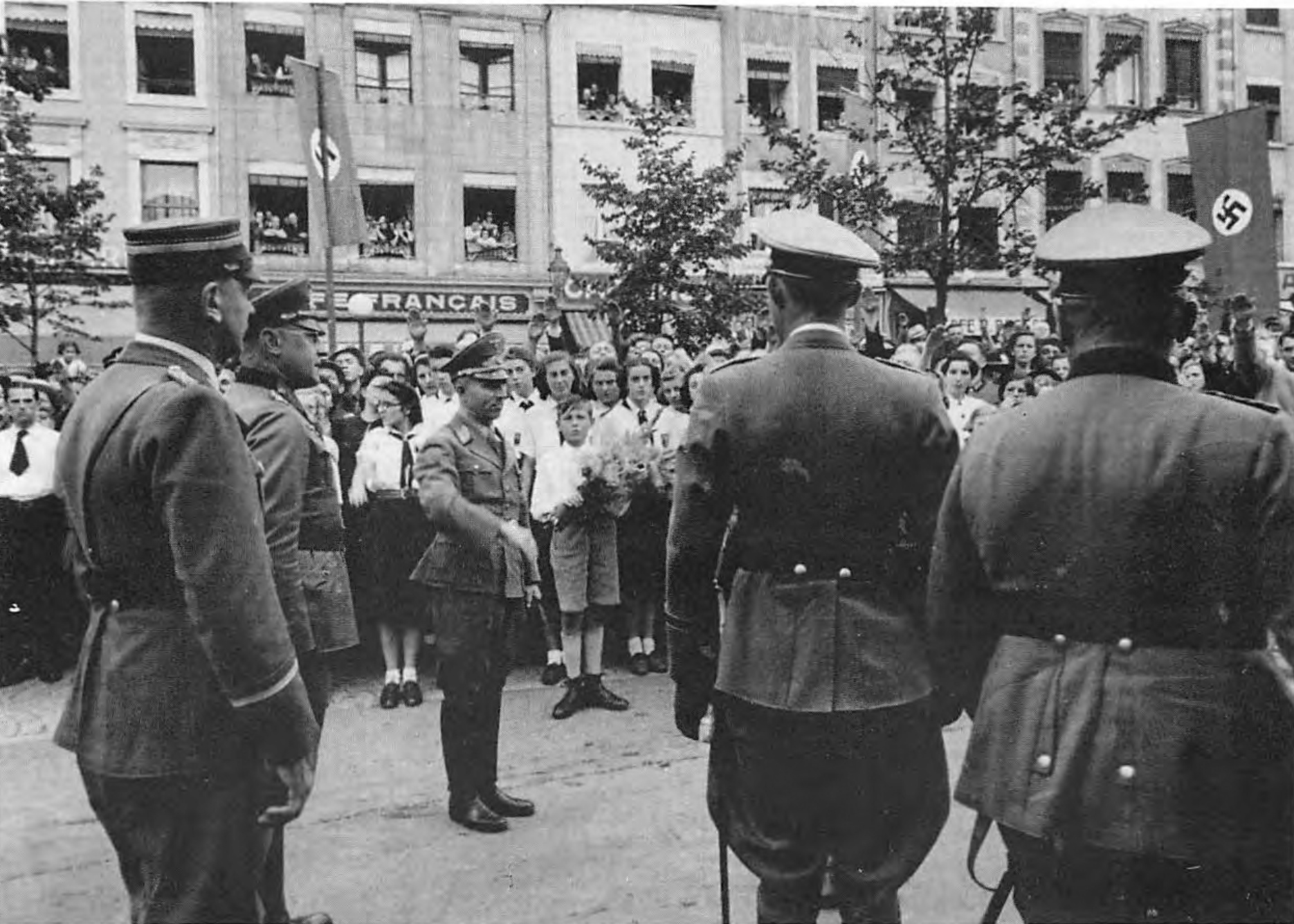
Nazi officers on Place d'Armes, Luxembourg City, in 1941 or 1942

The German occupation of Luxembourg in World War II began in May 1940 after the Grand Duchy of Luxembourg was invaded by Nazi Germany. Although Luxembourg was officially neutral, it was situated at a strategic point at the end of the French Maginot Line. On 10 May 1940, the German Wehrmacht invaded Luxembourg, Belgium and the Netherlands. Luxembourg was initially placed under a military administration, but later became a civilly administrated territory and finally was de facto annexed directly into Germany. The Germans believed Luxembourg to be a Germanic state, and attempted to suppress what they perceived as alien French language and cultural influences. Although some Luxembourgers joined the resistance or collaborated with the Germans, both constituted a minority of the population. As German nationals, from 1942, many Luxembourgers were conscripted into the German military. Nearly 3,500 Luxembourgish Jews were murdered during the Holocaust. The liberation of the country by the Allies began in September 1944, but due to the Ardennes Offensive it was not completed until early 1945.

== Eve of the invasion ==
The outbreak of World War II on 1 September 1939 put Luxembourg's government in a delicate situation. On the one hand, the population's sympathy lay with Belgium and France; on the other hand, due to the country's policy of neutrality since 1867's Treaty of London, the government adopted a careful non-belligerent stance towards its neighbours. As of 1 September, Radio Luxembourg stopped broadcasting. In spring 1940, fortifications were erected along the borders with Germany and France. The so-called Schuster Line, named after its constructor, consisted of massive concrete roadblocks with steel doors. The official aim of these road blocks was to slow down the progress of any invading army and give time for the guarantors of Luxembourg's neutrality to take counteractions against the invaders. However, compared to the massive power of the German forces, it had only symbolic character and helped to calm down the population. Except for its small Corps des Gendarmes et Volontaires, Luxembourg did not possess an army, due to the treaty's restrictions.

After several false alarms in the spring of 1940, the probability of a military conflict between Germany and France grew. Germany stopped the export of coke for the Luxembourgish steel industry.

== Invasion ==
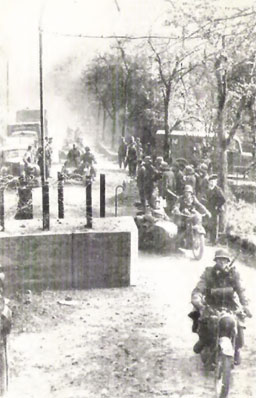
Germans troops crossing the Luxembourg border on 10 May 1940

The steel doors of the Schuster Line were ordered closed on 10 May 1940 at 03:15, following movements of German troops on the east side of the border rivers Our, Sauer and Mosel. In the meantime, German special forces dressed as civilians and supported by Germans living in Luxembourg - the so-called Stoßtrupp Lützelburg - tried to sabotage radio broadcasting and the barricades along the German-Luxembourgish border but their attempt failed. The Royal Family was evacuated from its residence in Colmar-Berg to the Grand Ducal palace in Luxembourg City.

The German invasion, made up of the 1st, 2nd, and 10th Panzer Divisions began at 04:35. They encountered no significant resistance save for some bridges destroyed and some land mines, since the majority of the Luxembourgish Volunteer Corps stayed in their barracks. Luxembourgish police resisted the German troops, however, to little avail; the capital city being occupied before noon. Total Luxembourgish casualties amounted to 75 police and soldiers captured, six police wounded, and one soldier wounded. At 08:00, elements of the French 3rd Light Cavalry Division of General Robert Petiet, supported by the 1st Spahi Brigade of Colonel Jouffault and the 2nd company of the 5th Armoured Battalion, crossed the southern border to conduct a probe of German forces; these units later retreated behind the Maginot Line. By the evening of 10 May 1940, most of the country, with the exception of the south, was occupied by German forces. More than 90,000 civilians evacuated from the canton of Esch-sur-Alzette as a consequence of the advance. 47,000 fled to France, 45,000 fled into the central and northern part of Luxembourg.

Grand Duchess Charlotte and the government of prime minister Pierre Dupong fled to France, Portugal and the United Kingdom, before finally settling in Canada for the duration of the war. Charlotte, exiled in London, became an important symbol of national unity. Her eldest son and heir, Jean, volunteered for the British Army in 1942. The only official representative left behind was Albert Wehrer, head of a governmental commission, as well as the 41 members of the Chamber of Deputies.

== Governance ==
=== Military administration ===
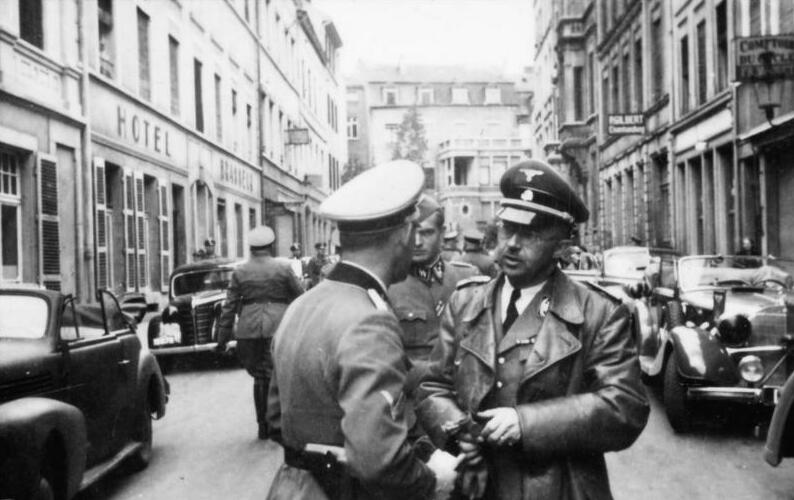
Heinrich Himmler visiting Luxembourg in July 1940

Early on 10 May 1940, the German diplomat Von Radowitz handed the general secretary of the Luxembourgish government a memorandum from the German government, stating that Germany had no intention of changing the territorial integrity or political independence of the Grand Duchy. The following day, a military administration for Luxembourg was set up. Luxembourgish interests were represented by a governmental commission under Albert Wehrer, which consisted of senior civil servants and had been legitimated by the Chamber of Deputies. There was a good relationship between this commission and the military authorities, as Colonel Schumacher showed a broad-minded attitude towards the country's problems and a willingness to solve these in consultation with the government commission.

On 13 July 1940, the Volksdeutsche Bewegung (VdB) was founded in Luxembourg City under the leadership of Damian Kratzenberg, a German teacher at the Athénée de Luxembourg. Its main goal was to push the population towards a German-friendly position by means of propaganda, and it was this organisation that used the phrase Heim ins Reich.

Several Deputies and high-ranking civil servants were of the opinion that Luxembourg could retain a measure of autonomy under the military administration, as had occurred in World War I, and attempts were made to come to some sort of arrangement with Germany. However, it was soon made clear by the authorities in Berlin that Luxembourg's fate would be very different this time. The Nazis considered the Luxembourgish people as just another Germanic ethnic group and the Grand Duchy a German territory. The military authorities were withdrawn from Luxembourg by 31 July 1940, to be replaced by a civil administration under Gustav Simon.

=== Civil administration and annexation ===
Gustav Simon led the administration of occupied Luxembourg as Gauleiter of Moselland.

Gustav Simon was appointed Chef der Zivilverwaltung (CdZ; "Chief of the Civil Administration") by the Oberkommando des Heeres on 21 July 1940. Luxembourg was then included into the CdZ-Gebiet Luxemburg on 29 July. While initially subordinate to the military commands in Belgium and northern France, Simon was confirmed in his appointment on 2 August by Adolf Hitler himself, indicating that he reported directly to the Führer and no one else. This granted him a wide degree of autonomy with regards to the military and civil authorities of Nazi Germany.

Simon, who was also the Gauleiter of the neighbouring Gau Trier-Koblenz, later Moselland (Gauleiter being a title denoting the leader of a regional branch of the Nazi party), led a propaganda and later terror campaign, known as Heim ins Reich, to convince the population that they were ethnic Germans and a natural part of the Third Reich. His objective was "to win Luxembourg back over to the German nation as soon as possible." He was convinced that Luxembourgers only needed a level of education and enlightenment in order to voluntarily declare their loyalty to Germany. He deduced this from his belief that they were, in fact, German "by blood and by descent". To the Gauleiter, Luxembourgish independence was an "absurd idea," which existed only because the monarchy and government had nurtured it: if the Luxembourgers were shown evidence of their belonging to the German nation, the will to be independent must disappear.

== Life in occupied Luxembourg ==
The general public were slow to react at first, still feeling shock from the invasion of 1914–1918. Furthermore, the royal family and the government had silently fled into exile. The majority of the population kept their heads low to avoid any conflict with the authorities; others participated in acts of passive resistance.

=== Germanification ===
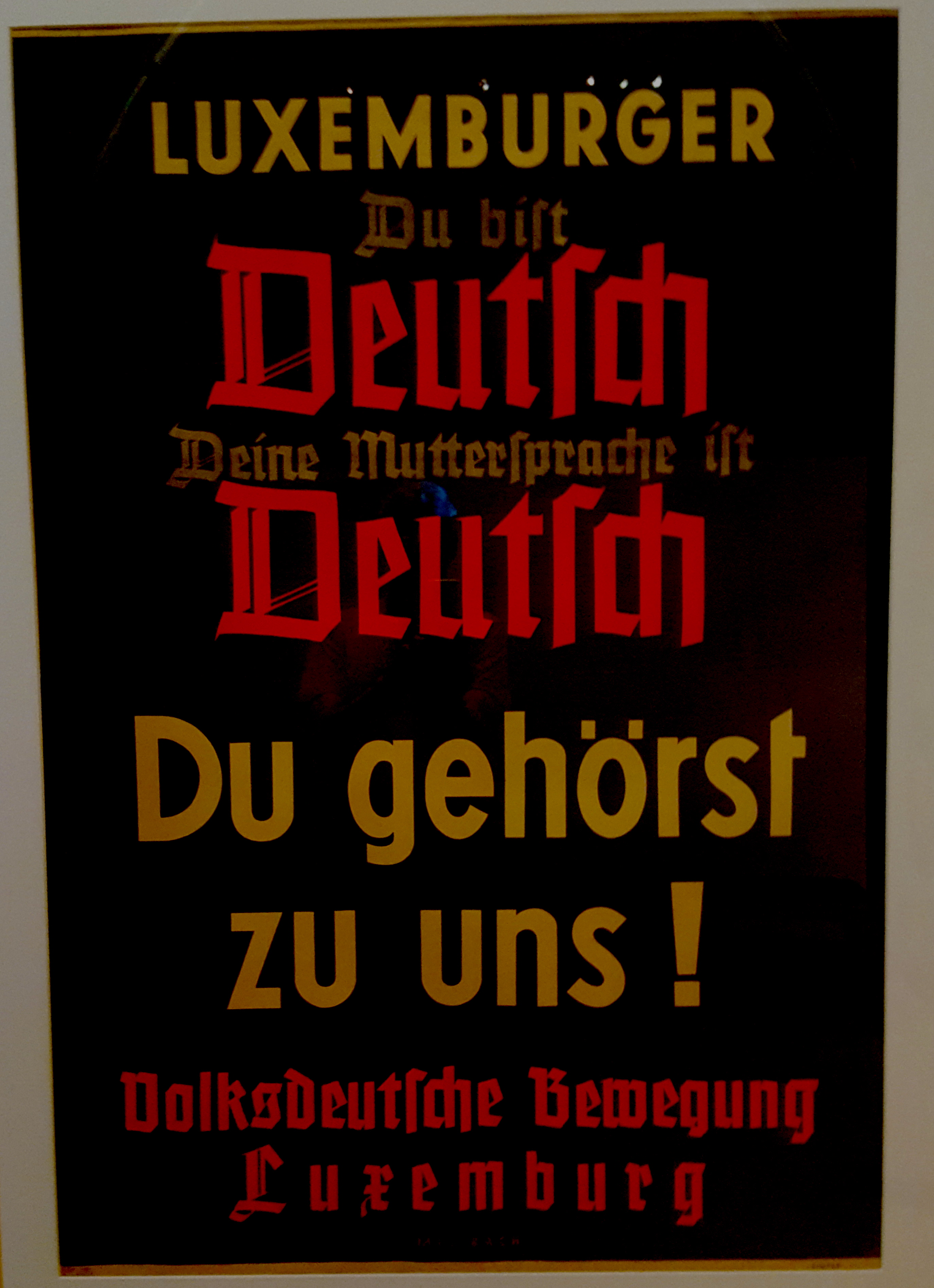
Propaganda poster promoting Germanisation

The administration of Simon arrived in Luxembourg fully persuaded that the "German-ness" of the Luxembourgers merely lay under a thin external layer of French influence. This in turn meant that, with a bit of determined "unraveling" by his administration, the German character of the population would essentially reveal itself.

Simon had two clear goals:

- The Nazification and Germanisation of Luxembourg, i.e., the extinction of everything that was not of German source, like French names and words of French origin or a French way of life
- The destruction and dismemberment of the Luxembourgish state institutions, and the country's incorporation into the Third Reich

His very first series of decrees made this policy very clear:

- 6 August 1940: German became the only official language, and the usage of the French language was banned. The ban applied to official and administrative usage as well as everyday life. French expressions of courtesy such as "Bonjour", "Merci", "Monsieur", "Madame", etc. were included; people greeting each other had to say "Heil Hitler".
- Autumn 1940. The political parties and independent labour unions, the Parliament and the Conseil d'État were dissolved. All civil society organisations and the press were subjected to Nazi control.
- Till end 1940. German law was introduced including the Sondergerichte and the Nuremberg Laws.
- 31 January 1941: French-sounding family names, first names, and the names of streets, towns, shops and companies were Germanised, that is, translated into their German counterpart or simply replaced by something more Germanic. Henri became Heinrich, Dupont became Brückner.
- 18 February 1941: Wearing a beret (a traditional cap from the Northern Basque Country) was forbidden.
- From May 1941 many Luxembourgish youth were ordered to participate in the Reichsarbeitsdienst.

A massive propaganda campaign was launched to influence the population, while not only dissidents and critics but also teachers, officials and leading business figures were threatened with losing their jobs unless they joined Nazi organisations, which led to much increased recruitment from all professions. A central registry documented the personal opinion regarding the Nazi regime of almost every citizen. People who were openly opposed to the regime lost their jobs or were deported, mainly to eastern Germany and in the worst cases sent to the death camps where many of them were murdered.

The occupation authorities attempted to cover Luxembourg with a net of political, social and cultural organisations, such as also existed in Germany, including the Hitler Youth, the League of German Girls, the Winterhilfswerk, the NS-Frauenschaft and the Deutsche Arbeitsfront.

=== Catholic Church ===
The Catholic Church in Luxembourg was relatively silent during the war, and took no public stance regarding the fate of the Jews or the Nazi regime. On the one hand, the Bishop, Joseph Laurent Philippe, was bedridden due to illness, and was therefore in no state to provide active opposition. On the other hand, the Bishop did not want to further antagonise the occupiers and endanger the already precarious religious life of the Church, which was heavily restricted during wartime. Bishop Philippe did, however, refuse to meet with the Nazi leadership, and made preparations in case his post should fall vacant.

The Church saw its very existence threatened as it was pushed out of public life by the anti-religious policies of the Nazis: public religious events such as the Octave celebration or the dancing procession were banned, Christian organisations were dissolved, religious education in schools was abolished, and a ban on the religious orders was put in place.

At the same time, the diocese administration remained one of very few Luxembourgish institutions that stayed intact during the war, although this was in doubt for a while, and a deportation of the Bishop was considered by the occupation authorities. Plans were made to deport him to Vichy France, though this failed due to the objections of the German ambassador in Paris and of the Sicherheitsdient headquarters in Berlin.

The Bishop's primary concern was to maintain pastoral care. In order to preserve this, he was prepared to give way on individual points. Thus, he made no official protest against the measures of the Zivilverwaltung, and tried to keep members of the clergy from "ill-considered" actions.

Many priests felt differently from the Bishop and used their influence on their congregations to strengthen their patriotic feelings, and protested against the occupation or became active in the Resistance. In the course of the war, out of 446 Catholic priests in Luxembourg, 58 were arrested, 16 imprisoned in Dachau and 7 were killed there. Another 18 clerics were deported to Vichy France.

=== Economy ===
Luxembourg's economy was dominated by heavy industry, especially mining and the steel industry. For its raw materials, and to sell its finished products it depended on the overseas market. Economically it could only survive by adhering to a wider economic area. In the 19th century it had been part of the German Confederation and the German customs union. After World War I, under Allied pressure, it re-oriented itself towards the West. German capital and companies — heavily present in the steel industry until then — left the country, and Luxembourg joined the Belgium–Luxembourg Economic Union (UEBL).

In the 1920s, Germany once again became Luxembourg's second-biggest economic partner, far ahead of France or Britain. As Germany was a large buyer of its heavy industry products, and provided 90% of Luxembourg's coal needs, the smaller country was dependent on Germany and susceptible to its pressures or threats.

As soon as the country was occupied, German heavy industry declared its interest in the Luxembourgish iron/steel mills. They let their wishes be known in Berlin and staked their claims. The Vereinigte Stahlwerke requested to take over Hadir; both the Reichswerke and Hoesch AG wanted to take over ARBED.

On 15 August 1940 the German currency and customs border was extended, so that Luxembourg was brought into the German economic area and its economic union with Belgium dissolved. On 29 January 1941 the Reichsmark became the only legal payment method, and the Cdz ordered all Luxembourgish currency to be handed in. The most important of the German tax laws were gradually rolled out in Luxembourg.

=== Resistance ===
The Luxembourgish resistance was carried out by only a small fraction of the population. Its formation was spontaneous and slow at first. The first groups were formed from autumn 1940 to summer 1941. In the beginning they worked without coordination and from different motivations, for instance Liberals opposed to the anti-Jewish policies and in favour of democracy as well as conservative Roman Catholics with sometimes more or less anti-national socialist tendencies. Some of the latter category also were at the same time opposed to the Soviet Union and "Bolshevism", hoping that the generals of the Wehrmacht would defeat Joseph Stalin and the Red Army, while at the same time hiding Jews and anti-Nazi clergy mixed together in their farms. The Luxembourg Resistance was joined by the Communist Party of Luxembourg only after the invasion of the USSR in June 1941.

The activities of the Resistance were largely directed towards undermining the German monopoly on information, and providing moral support to the population, by spreading counter-propaganda by word-of-mouth, leaflets, posters and later whole newspapers. Additionally, the Resistance helped Allied POWs and shot-down pilots, "deserters" from the Wehrmacht and other endangered Luxembourgers to cross the borders into Belgium or France. The introduction of forced labour and conscription into the Wehrmacht added to the Resistance's tasks: a large number of youths who refused to serve in the German armed forces now had to be hidden around the country and kept safe and fed, or helped to escape abroad. Collections of food and money were also made to help the families of those who were arrested, deported, or fired from their jobs. An increasingly important part of the Resistance's activities was to provide military, political and economic intelligence to the Allies. While some acts of sabotage did take place, they were rare and were seen as too risky in a small country with no remote areas to which they could withdraw. For similar reasons, armed combat by the Resistance against the occupiers was rare. Finally, many of the movements made contact with the government-in-exile, the Allies, and the French and Belgian resistance movements, with about 400 men joining the armed resistance in France. Additionally around 300 men from Luxembourg left their country to fight in the Ardennes section of the Witte Brigade, where they formed the so-called Red Lion Brigade.

Several well-known Catholic and Communist households, and many parishes and priories, also kept a number of Jewish Luxembourgish civilians and foreign Jews hidden and safe.

==== Passive resistance ====
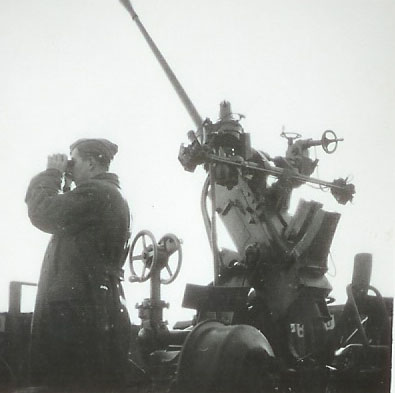
Luxembourgers serving in the German army as Luftwaffenhelfer

Non-violent passive resistance was widespread in Luxembourg during the period. From August 1940, the Spéngelskrich (the "War of Pins") took place as Luxembourgers wore patriotic pin-badges (depicting the national colours or the Grand duchess), precipitating attacks from the VdB.

In October 1941, the German occupiers took a survey of Luxembourgish civilians who were asked to state their nationality, their mother tongue and their racial group, but contrary to German expectations, 95% answered "Luxembourgish" to each question. The refusal to declare themselves as German citizens led to mass arrests.

Conscription was particularly unpopular. On 31 August 1942, shortly after the announcement that conscription would be extended to all men born between 1920 and 1927, a strike began in the northern town of Wiltz. The strike spread rapidly, paralysing the factories and industries of Luxembourg. The strike was quickly repressed and its leaders arrested. 20 were summarily tried before a special tribunal (in German, a "Standgericht") and executed by firing squad at nearby Hinzert concentration camp. Nevertheless, protests against conscription continued and 3,500 Luxembourgers would desert the German army after being conscripted.

=== Collaboration ===
Collaboration with the Nazi occupation is an aspect less often talked about in Luxembourg. Studies have shown that collaboration was a phenomenon in all layers of society. There was, however, an over-representation of civil servants among the collaborators. On average, the collaborators were younger than the general population. In early September 1944, approximately 10,000 people left Luxembourg with the German civil administration: it is generally assumed that this consisted of 3,500 collaborators and their families. In 1945, 5,101 Luxembourgers, including 2,857 men and 2,244 women were in prison for political activities, constituting 1.79% of the population. Twelve collaborators were sentenced to death and were shot in Reckenthal in Luxembourg City. 249 were sentenced to forced labour, 1366 were sentenced to prison and 645 were sent to workhouses.

=== Repression ===
Faced with opposition from the general public the regime took brutal measures against any form of resistance. After the general strike of 1942, Gustav Simon proclaimed a state of emergency and introduced the German Standgerichte. Thousands were arrested and tortured. Hundreds were murdered in the concentration camps. Whole families were deported to eastern Germany and replaced by German families, mainly from South-Tyrol and Eastern Europe. The headquarters of the Gestapo, the Villa Pauly, became the symbol of this terror.

In August 1940, the Gestapo had established its headquarters in the Villa Pauly in Luxembourg City, with field offices in the Villa Seligmann in Esch and the Villa Conter in Diekirch.

On 9 September 1942, the Gauleiter announced a "Resettlement operation for Luxembourg". From then until 1944, more than 1,410 families (4,200 individuals) were resettled to the East, the Sudetenland and Upper Silesia. Their property was stolen and they were to be educated into becoming "good Germans", being forbidden from returning to Luxembourg. From 1943, in addition to families deported for political reasons, the Germans started resettling families whose sons evaded conscription into the Wehrmacht or who had deserted from their units. Out of these resettled people, 73 died in the camps, including 9 children, mostly due to malnutrition and the lack of medical facilities.

=== Culture and arts ===
After a short period of boycott, from 1941 cinemas became a place to escape and forget everyday life, in this generally dark period for the country. Alongside the increadingly tough repression of the German apparatus from 1941/42, the public's passion for cinema increased. In a time of war, occupation and repression, cinema was one of few means of distraction available to the wider public.

Audiences eagerly consumed comedies, love films, high-spectacle productions and musical films. Aside from numerous reactions of disapproval in cinemas when films of explicit propaganda or the news were shown, the Luxembourg public's hostility towards Nazi German and the occupation manifested itself in other domains of social, cultural and political life (boycotting official events, the census of 10 October 1941, strike of 31 August 1942). But unlike most events organised by the occupiers (plays, concerts, public lectures), cinema was not seen as explicitly Nazi, despite most of the films being from Germany, and watching German entertainment films was not seen as expressing support for the occupiers.

The Luxembourgish public were generally hostile towards films whose Nazi propaganda message was too conspicuous. Films such as Ohm Krüger, Cadets, or Sieg im Westen were intended to praise the German spirit, glorify heroic deaths, stigmatise Germany's enemies, appeal to unconditional submission to Nazi Germany and convince Luxembourgers that their destiny lay in the German fold; these films were accompanied by aggressive advertising. In spite of this, they were rejected by most Luxembourgish cinema-goers, and German propaganda cinema did not succeed in putting a stop to the Luxembourgish public's pro-American and pro-British sympathies.

Yet at the same time, the public's majority anti-German attitude did not prevent it from becoming infatuated with a certain number of film productions that were fiercely conservative, if not explicitly Nazi. In Luxembourg, even among the fiercest opponents of the occupation, some were characterised by ideological convictions that were aggressively conservative, in some cases reactionary and authoritarian. This may explain the (relative) success of films such as the antisemitic Jud Süß, or Die goldene Stadt, a melodrama with racist undertones celebrating Germanic virtues and imbued with the "blood and soil" ideology.

== The Holocaust ==
Before the invasion, 3,900 Jews lived in Luxembourg, many of them refugees from Germany and Austria. On the night of 10 May 1940, about 1,600 of them left the country. After Simon introduced the Nuremberg Laws, life became unbearable for the Jewish population. Their shops, possessions and money were confiscated and all Jewish employees were fired. They were not allowed inside public buildings or to keep pets. Up until 15 October 1941, a further 1,500 Jews left the country on the orders of the authorities. The Gestapo accompanied them to France and Spain but, since they were rejected there, they went on an endless odyssey.

On 23 August 1941, a curfew was introduced for the Jewish population and they were degraded to second class citizens. The synagogues in Luxembourg City and Esch-sur-Alzette were destroyed; the ones in Ettelbruck and Mondorf-les-Bains were devastated. The Nazis concentrated most of the remaining 800 Jews in the old monastery of Cinqfontaines (Fünfbrunnen). From here, they were deported on 7 trains from 16 October 1941 to 17 June 1943 to the ghetto of Litzmannstadt and the concentration camps of Lublin and Theresienstadt, and from 1943 directly to the extermination camp of Auschwitz.

On 17 June 1943, Gustav Simon announced Luxembourg to be Judenfrei. From the 683 deported, only 43 survived.

== Liberation ==
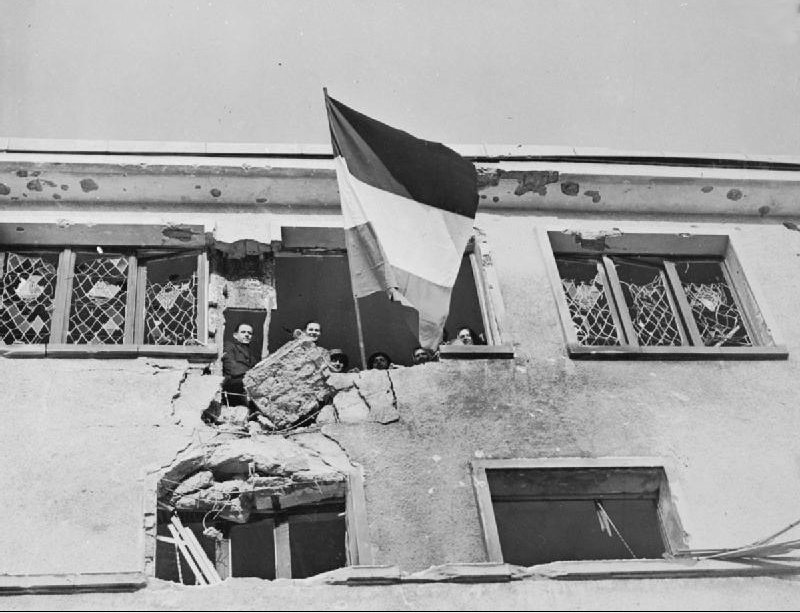
Civilians in Wiltz flying the flag of Luxembourg during the town's liberation by U.S. forces

Luxembourg was liberated by Allied forces in September 1944, specifically U.S. Army Combat Command A (CCA), 5th Armored Division. The first U.S. forces entered Luxembourgish territory near Petange on 9 September, and liberated the capital city on 10 September 1944. The Germans retreated without fighting. By 12 September 90% of the Grand Duchy had been liberated. One month before the start of the Battle of the Bulge, 250 soldiers of the Waffen-SS had unsuccessfully tried to recapture the town of Vianden from the Luxembourgish Resistance during the Battle of Vianden. During the Battle of the Bulge, the northern part of the country was hit by artillery from a special unit that the Germans designed to send shells up to 40 km (25 mi) away (see V3), but the Germans did not retake the city.

== Casualties and damage ==
In total, 5,700 Luxembourgish citizens died during World War II, which corresponds to 2% of the population of 1940, the highest such loss in Western Europe. Additionally, 18,658 buildings were destroyed or heavily damaged, counting for 1/3 of all buildings in Luxembourg (affecting 39% the population). These numbers put into perspective how high the losses of Luxembourg actually were during World War II. (Most of the damages occurred during the Battle of the Bulge.)

== Legacy ==
The government-in-exile in 1941 declared all measures by the German occupiers to be null and void, which it re-affirmed in 1944. However, it also stated that "[n]ot all is bad in the German system, we would do well to conserve some of the institutions that they have introduced." Hence, when the exiled government returned, it retained certain German regulations and dispositions in the areas of employment law, tax law and social legislation.

After the war the organisation "Ons Jongen" ("Our Boys") was formed to represent Luxembourgish conscripts into the Wehrmacht. The 10,000 affected young men and their families constituted a significant force in a country of around 300,000 inhabitants; they lobbied both the Luxembourgish government and the Federal Republic of Germany; later, they were represented by the "Federation of Victims of Nazism Forcibly Conscripted". Apart from lobbying, the organisation also undertook commemorative work. It almost certainly contributed to slowing the normalisation of Germano-Luxembourgish relations.

The Centre for Documentation and Research on the Resistance and the Centre for Documentation and Research on forced Conscription were founded in 2002 and 2005, respectively, to conduct research on the period of German occupation. They are funded by the government.

The German occupation period features in the following drama films: Déi zwéi vum Bierg (1985), Der neunte Tag (2004), Réfractaire (2009), and Emil (2010); it is also the subject of the 2004 documentary Heim ins Reich.

Several street names in the capital city are named after World War II events in Luxembourg, or pay tribute to Allied military or political leaders in the war, especially those that had a hand in the liberation of Luxembourg:

- Allée des Résistants et des Déportés
- Avenue Charles-de-Gaulle
- Avenue du Dix-Septembre
- Boulevard d'Avranches
- Boulevard Franklin-D.-Roosevelt
- Boulevard Général-George-S.-Patton
- Rue de la Grève
- Place des Martyrs
- Rue du Plébiscite
- Rue General-Major-Lunsford-E.-Oliver
- Rue George-C.-Marshall

== See also ==
- Luxembourg in World War II
- Battle of Vianden
- 1942 Luxembourgish general strike
- Luxembourgish government-in-exile
- Areas annexed by Nazi Germany
- Battle of Belgium
- Battle of the Netherlands
- National Museum of Military History (Luxembourg)
- German occupation of Luxembourg during World War I
- Gëlle Fra memorial
- Collaboration with the Axis powers

== Bibliography and further reading ==
- Beck, Henri (2002). "L'administration municipale: De l'organisation luxembourgeoise au régime nazi" (PDF). Ons Stad (in French) (71). Archived from the original (PDF) on 16 August 2016.
- Cerf, Paul (1 July 1985). "Les expulsions des juifs du Grand-Duché vers la France de Vichy au début de l'occupation allemande". Hémecht (in French). 37 (3): 435ff.
- Dostert, Paul (1985). Luxemburg zwischen Selbstbehauptung und nationaler Selbstaufgabe: Die deutsche Besatzungspolitik und die Volksdeutsche Bewegung 1940-1945 (in German). Luxembourg: Editions Saint-Paul.
- Dostert, Paul. "Historique de la Villa Pauly". Seconde Guerre mondiale - Centres de Documentation et de Recherche sur la Résistance et sur l'Enrôlement forcé (in French). Archived from the original on 4 March 2016.
- Dostert, Paul (1 July 2014). "Die christlichen Kirchen in Luxemburg während des Zweiten Weltkrieges". Hémecht. 66 (3/4): 487ff.
- Engel, Marcel; Hohengarten, André (1983). Das SS-Sonderlager im Hunsrück 1939-1945 (in German). Luxembourg: Editions St. Paul.
- Fisch, René; Molitor, E (1991). Die Luxemburger Kirche im 2. Weltkrieg: Dokumente, Zeugnisse, Lebensbilder (in German). Luxembourg: Editions Saint-Paul.
- Fletcher, William Allen (1970). "The German Administration in Luxemburg 1940–1942: Toward a 'de facto' Annexation". The Historical Journal. 13 (3): 533–544. doi:10.1017/s0018246x00009304. S2CID 159758250.
- Hohengarten, André (2002). "Die Nazi-Gewaltherrschaft in Luxemburg-Stadt" (PDF). Ons Stad (in German) (71): 5–11.
- Krier, Émile (1978). Deutsche Kultur- und Volkstumspolitik von 1933-1940 in Luxemburg (in German). Bonn: Universität.
- Majerus, Benoît (2002). "Kollaboration in Luxemburg: die falsche Frage?" (PDF). ... et wor alles net esou einfach. Fragen an die Geschichte Luxemburgs im Zweiten Weltkrieg. Ein Lesebuch zur Ausstellung (in German). Musée d'Histoire de la Ville de Luxembourg. pp. 126–140.
- May, Guy (2002). "Die Straßenbezeichnungen der Stadt Luxemburg unter deutscher Besatzung (1940-1944)" (PDF). Ons Stad (in German) (71). Archived from the original (PDF) on 4 March 2016.
- Nonnenmacher, Georges Gilbert (1966). La grande honte de l'incorporation de force des Alsaciens-Lorrains, Eupenois-Malmédiens et Luxembourgeois dans l'armée allemande au cours de la deuxième guerre mondiale (in French). Colmar.
- Powaski, Ronald E. (2008). Lightning War: Blitzkrieg in the West, 1940. Book Sales, Inc. ISBN 978-0-7858-2097-0.
- Quadflieg, Peter M. (2008). "Zwangssoldaten" und "Ons Jongen". Eupen-Malmedy und Luxemburg als Rekrutierungsgebiet der deutschen Wehrmacht im Zweiten Weltkrieg (in German). Aachen. ISBN 978-3-8322-7078-0.
- Raths, Aloyse (2008). Unheilvolle Jahre für Luxemburg - Années néfastes pour le Grand-Duché. Luxembourg.
- Spang, Paul (1982). Von der Zauberflöte zum Standgericht. Naziplakate in Luxemburg 1940-1944 (in German). Editions St. Paul.
- Thewes, Guy (2002). "Nationalsozialistische Architektur in Luxemburg" (PDF). Ons Stad (in German) (71). Archived from the original (PDF) on 14 February 2019.
- Thewes, Guy (2008). A propos ... Histoire du Grand-Duché de Luxembourg (PDF). Luxembourg: Imprimerie Hengen. ISBN 978-2-87999-093-4.
- Trausch, Gilbert (2003). L'Histoire du Luxembourg: Le destin d'un 'petit pays' (in French). Toulouse: Editions Privat.
- Volkmann, Hans-Erich (2010). Luxemburg im Zeichen des Hakenkreuzes: eine politische Wirtschaftsgeschichte 1933 bis 1944 (in German). Paderborn: Schöningh. ISBN 978-3-506-77067-7.
- Weber, Paul (1948). Geschichte Luxemburgs im Zweiten Weltkrieg (in German). Luxembourg: V. Buck.
- Wingerter, Elisabeth (2022). "La justice luxembourgeoise pendant l'occupation nazie et dans l'immédiat après- guerre (1940–1950)". In Fritz, Vera; Scuto, Denis; Wingerter, Elisabeth (eds.). Histoire de la Justice au Luxembourg (1795 à nos jours): Institutions – Organisation – Acteurs (in French). Berlin, Boston: De Gruyter Oldenbourg. pp. 179–216. doi:10.1515/9783110679656-008.
- Zariz, Ruth (Spring 1993). "The Jews of Luxembourg during the Second World War". Holocaust and Genocide Studies. 7 (1): 51–66. doi:10.1093/hgs/7.1.51.
