= Military Administration of Luxembourg =

German-occupied Luxembourg in 1940

- 1940
- Flag Emblem
- Status: Territory under German military administration
- Capital: Luxembourg City
- Common languages: German; Luxembourgish; French

Government
  - Leader of the Military Administration of Luxembourg: Carl-Alfred Schumacher
  - Head of the Volksdeutsche Bewegung: Damian Kratzenberg
- Historical era: World War II
  - Established: 11 May 1940
  - Invasion of Luxembourg: 10 May 1940
  - Disestablished: 29 July 1940

Population
  - 1940: 290,000
- Currency: Luxembourgish franc
Preceded by	Succeeded by
Luxembourg	Civil Administration Area of Luxembourg
- Today part of: Luxembourg

The military administration of German-occupied Luxembourg existed from 11 May 1940 to 29 July 1940, after which it was replaced with the Civil Administration Area of Luxembourg.

== History ==
Early on 10 May 1940, the German diplomat Von Radowitz handed the general secretary of the Luxembourgish government a memorandum from the German government, stating that Germany had no intention of changing the territorial integrity or political independence of the Grand Duchy. The following day, a military administration for Luxembourg was set up. Luxembourgish interests were represented by a governmental commission under Albert Wehrer, which consisted of senior civil servants and had been legitimated by the Chamber of Deputies. There was a good relationship between this commission and the military authorities, as Colonel Schumacher showed a broad-minded attitude towards the country's problems and a willingness to solve these in consultation with the government commission.

On 13 July 1940, the Volksdeutsche Bewegung (VdB) was founded in Luxembourg City under the leadership of Damian Kratzenberg, a German teacher at the Athénée de Luxembourg. Its main goal was to push the population towards a German-friendly position by means of propaganda, and it was this organisation that used the phrase Heim ins Reich.

Several Deputies and high-ranking civil servants were of the opinion that Luxembourg could retain a measure of autonomy under the military administration, as had occurred in World War I, and attempts were made to come to some sort of arrangement with Germany. However, it was soon made clear by the authorities in Berlin that Luxembourg's fate would be very different this time. The Nazis considered the Luxembourgish people as just another Germanic ethnic group and the Grand Duchy a German territory. The military authorities had to leave Luxembourg by 31 July 1940, to be replaced by a civil administration under Gustav Simon.
