= Service Clarence =

MI6 espionage network in Belgium during WWII

Service Clarence (1939/40 -1945) (or the Clarence network; in French: Le Réseau Clarence) was one of the most successful MI6 networks in Belgium during the Second World War.

== Name and leadership ==
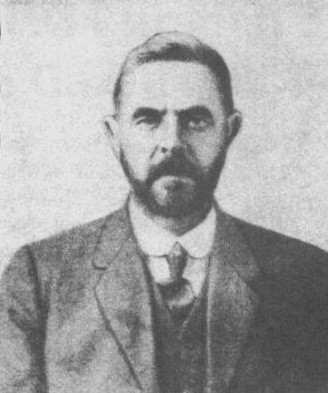
Walthère Dewé

It was led by Hector Demarque (1903-1975) and Walthère Dewé. Dewé had earlier played a leading role in 'La Dame Blanche.' He used the experience of the Dame Blanche network to start a new network, codenamed Clarence.

The network was named 'Clarence' after the pseudonym of Hector Demarque. As Walthère Dewé was targeted for his activities in the First World War, he went into hiding, but behind the scenes he remained the top leader. He adopted the pseudonym 'Cleveland'.

== Function and success ==
Throughout the war, Service Clarence provided valuable information on a wide range of enemy activity, including coastal defenses, the effects of Allied bombing and the location of German units.

The Service Clarence network was a source of high quality and detailed intelligence on enemy troop movements, German order of battle, and Nazi secret weapons.

It was the "most successful Belgian network."

Furthermore, Claude Dansey, who controlled SIS operations in occupied Europe for most of the war, "later said that, in terms of the quality and quantity of its reports,"occupied first place among the military intelligence networks operating in occupied Europe."

== Members ==
Service Clarence was made up of one sector per Belgian province, a road sector and a French sector. In 1940, the network could only rely on short-range radio transmitters and failed to contact London. Attempts to establish contact with London via France and Spain by land courier were not crowned with the expected success. The relationship with London was established when Jean Lamy parachuted into the Manhay region with a two-way radio.

Several former members of Dame Blanche belonged to Service Clarence. One of its agents, since the summer of 1942, was Henri Roth; his son Leon-Henri Roth was a forced labourer at Peenemunde who passed vital information about the secret German rocket development to him, and via another Service Clarence agent Adolphe Godart to the British (SIS). The info was used in Operation Hydra.

Belgian Albert Van den Berg, who saved hundreds of Jews and was honored in 1995 by Yad Vashem as one of the Righteous Among the Nations, was also a Clarence member. Count Antoine d'Ursel was an early member of the Clarence Network and became head of the Comet Line which assisted Allied airmen shot down over Europe to escape German capture.

Marcel Verhamme, codenamed Fortuné, was caught in 1943 and was executed in November of that year.

At the end of the war, 1,547 resistance fighters were officially recognized as having served in this intelligence network. Among them, Alice Cheramy stands out for her courage and efficiency as a liaison officer. She obtained the status of first class auxiliary agent at the proposal of the head of the network, Hector Demarque, in June 1946.

The Brabant section had two sectors, directed by Dr. Antoine Goethals and Franz Leemans.

== Dewé's end ==
Walthère Dewé was shot and killed while trying to avoid capture by the Germans in 1944.

The organization survived his execution.

== See also ==
- Belgium in World War II
- Free Belgian Forces
- Österreichische Freiheitsfront
- Witte Brigade
