= Albert van den Berg =

Albert van den Berg may refer to:

- Albert van den Berg (rugby union), South African rugby union player
- Albert van den Berg (physicist), Dutch physicist
- Albert Van den Berg (resistant), Belgian lawyer, active in the Belgian Resistance during the Second World War
- Albert Jan van den Berg, Dutch professor of law
