= Henry Roth (disambiguation) =

Henry Roth (1906–1995) was an American novelist and short story writer.

Henry Roth may also refer to:

- Henry Ling Roth (1855–1925), anthropologist
- Henry Roth, character played by Adam Sandler in 50 First Dates

== See also ==
- Henry Roth House on the National Register of Historic Places listings in Southeast Denver, Colorado
- Leon-Henri Roth (c. 1922–1945), WWII resistance
