= Marcel Louette =

Belgian resistance member

Marcel Louette (1907–1978), codenamed "Fidelio", was a member of the Belgian resistance during World War II and founder of the White Brigade in 1940. Before the war he had been a school teacher in Antwerp.

== Sources ==
- Henri Bernard, La Résistance. 1940-1945, La Renaissance du Livre, 1969
- Archiefbank Vlaanderen - Verzetsgroep Fidelio: van Antwerpse Jonge Geuzen tot witte ridders (10 Feb 2006)
- De Achttiendaahse Veldtocht - 36Li.jpg36ste Linieregiment (36Li) - Overzicht op 10 mei 1940
- TracesofWar.com: Auffanglager Breendonk
- TracesofWar.com: De Witte Brigade - Fidelio
- DeWereldMorgen.be Witte Brigade Fidelio wil erkenning (11 June 2012)
- Schoonselhof Cemetery: Marcel Louette
