= Marcel Verhamme =

Marcel Verhamme (died 16 November 1943) was a Belgian Resistance fighter during World War II.

A radio telegrapher by profession, he was recruited in 1941 by Walthère Dewé for the resistance network known as Service Clarence. Before his eventual arrest on 29 July 1943 Verhamme transmitted some 200 radio messages to London and received another 150. He was executed in Brussels on 16 November 1943.

His codenamed was Fortuné.
