= Leon-Henri Roth =

Luxembourgish resistant fighter in WII

Léon-Henri Roth (29 August 1922 – 24 March 1945) was a Luxembourgish resistance fighter. In addition, his information (he passed while being a forced labourer), had contributed to the Allies awareness of Germans working on rocket weapons in its 1943 operations, leading to the destruction by the RAF of the German experimental rocket-launching station at Peenemunde on the Baltic.

Born in Echternach he was exiled, after being caught starting a resistance cell, punished in Luxembourgish enrolés de force (forced labourers). He had worked at Peenemünde. He successfully got letters through to his father, Leon Roth, a member of a Belgian network. The report stated: "development of a large rocket which made a noise resembling that of 'a squadron at low altitude'."

For fear his family would suffer from the Gestapo, he refused to be helped escaping. Later on, he died while in a German military car.

== Passing information ==
Leon Roth was the main courier between Luxembourg and Belgium for the Belgian 'White Army' resistance force (Witte Brigade) and a member of the network which smuggled Belgian and French POWs out of Germany after their escape.

In the summer of 1942, Roth made also contact with another Belgian group, the 'Service Clarence', organized by a policeman named Adolphe Godart and was given the codename 'Oscar 8353.' He had been ordered to obtain information about German war factories in Wiltz. Thus it was that at his next meeting with Godart—'Pierre 8360'—he mentioned his son's censored letter. Godart contacted London and was informed that it was of the greatest importance to find out where young Roth was employed. The wheel had started to turn.

Leon-Henri had the right to write to his family, though his correspondence naturally went through the censor's hands. In his first letter the censors had cut out a whole page, and mention of the place where Roth worked was completely obliterated. So his father, at Service Clarence, drew their attention to it. The situation was exploited.

As he did not want his letters to be censored again, he began to post them from the nearby town of Zinnowitz. His very next letter created a minor sensation in the 'Clarence' network, for it contained not only a sketch map of the Usedom set-up but also said that experiments were being carried out with 'an aerial torpedo, which moves under its own power and makes a noise as if a squadron of heavy bombers were approaching'. Slightly garbled, that same description was to turn up in Jones' most secret report to Mr Churchill in July 1943. "The torpedo ... was said to be motor driven and released over the beach with the noise of a squadron at low altitude."

Roth's letters continued to be a very valuable source of information for the Secret Intelligence Service (SIS) (MI6). 'Pierre 8360' and his deputy, 'Hubert 8362', used to come to the Belgian frontier personally to collect them from Leon. Leon kept the originals, hidden in a safe place.

The two agents received copies, which Leon hoped might save his son if 'Pierre' and 'Hubert' were captured. When Leon-Henri returned from Peenemuende in 1943, the RAF 'Squadron' the SIS's own agentdropping force, offered to collect him from a secret air strip near the village of Sure. Henri declined. If the Gestapo discovered he was gone, his father and family would suffer, thus, he stayed. Already under suspicion, Roth thought that service in the German forces would be the best way to 'go underground' without endangering his family. He served for some time in Russia before being transferred to the German cruiser Admiral Scheer.

Information was received from Leon Henri Roth and Dr Schwagen, both Luxembourgish enrolés de force (forced labourers), who had worked at Peenemünde and smuggled out letters describing rocket research, giving conflicting accounts of the size, warhead range and means of propulsion of the device. Despite the confusion, there was little doubt that the Germans were working on a rocket and in April 1943, the Chiefs of Staff warned operational HQs of the possibility of rocket weapons.

== Death ==
Roth was killed by American army fire in 1945 while escaping with two Frenchmen in a German military car, after deserting Admiral Scheer. Per the ship's captain, Roth deserted on 20 March. He was re-interred in Luxembourg in 1968 and awarded the highest decoration of the resistance.

== See also ==
- Operation Hydra (1943)
