= Robert Petiet =

French army general (1880–1967)

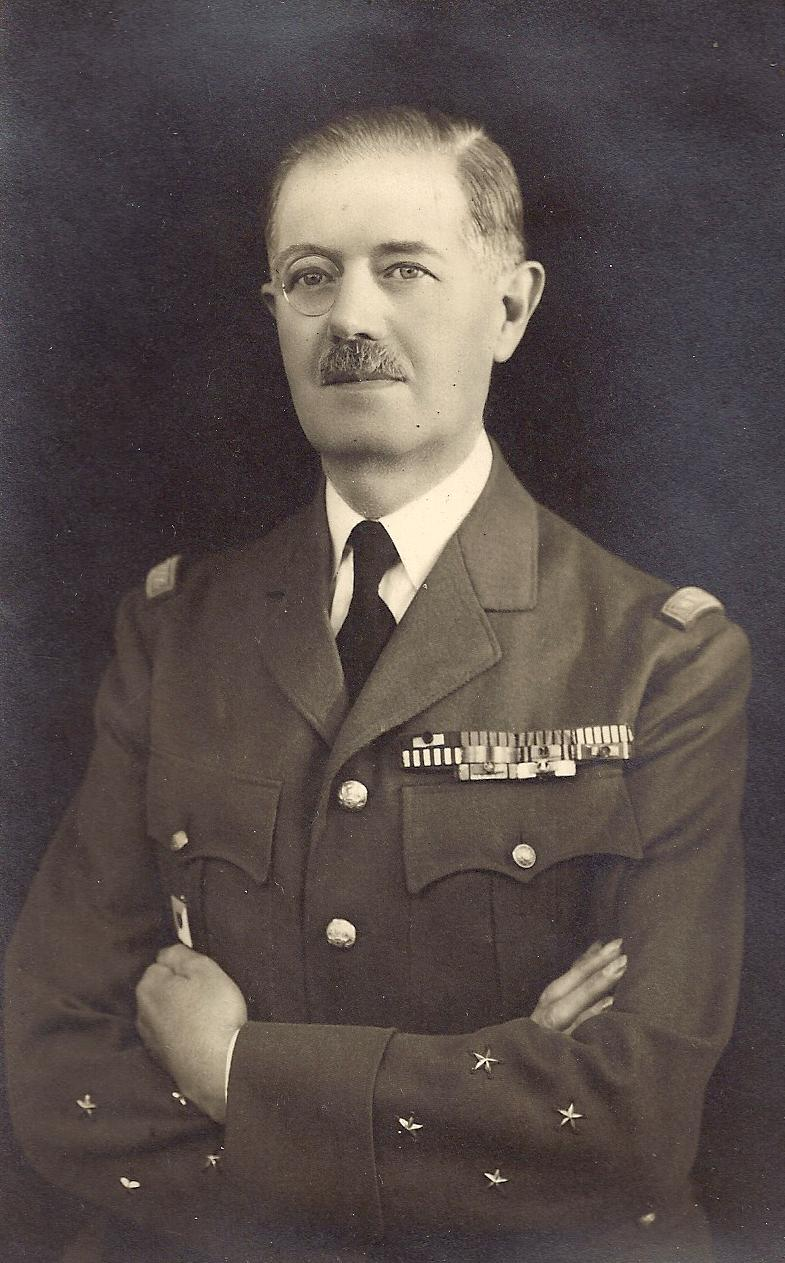
- Born: Robert Marie Édouard Petiet; 10 April 1880; Paris
- Died: 15 October 1967 (aged 87); Paris
- Education: École spéciale militaire de Saint-Cyr (1898–1900); École de cavalerie, Saumur
- Occupation: French Army - Cavalry
- Years active: 1898–1941
- Known for: Leading squadrons during the First and Second World Wars.
- Title: Lieutenant General
- Family: Petiet, Baron of the Empire
- Honours: Commandeur de la Légion d'honneur; Croix de guerre 1914-1918; Croix de guerre 1939-1945

Robert Marie Édouard Petiet (10 April 1880 – 15 October 1967) was a French army general. He served in the French Army from 1898 to 1941 and fought in both the First World War and Second World War.

== Early life ==
Petiet was born in Paris, France in 1880 to engineer André Petiet, a descendant of Claude Petiet, a minister during Napoleonic France, and Adèle Bricogne. He and his brother, Charles Petiet would go on to successful careers.

In 1898, Petiet entered the French military academy Saint-Cyr and graduated in 1900 ranked 50th out of the 550 students. As a second lieutenant of dragoons’’, Petiet attended the Saumur Cavalry School where he graduated twice. Once as a second lieutenant and then as captain. By 1911, Petiet was an instructor teaching at the academy.

== First and Second World Wars ==
Throughout the First World War, Petiet commanded the 3rd Squadron of the 5th Dragoons where he is cited. He was then appointed to the staff of the 3rd Cavalry Division.

In September 1918, Petiet transferred to the 6th Cavalry Division as the chief of staff. Then between 1920 and 1928, Petiet was mechanising the weapons of the division and in 1926, was appointed lieutenant colonel. Then in 1928 he was appointed inspector-general of cavalry.

In 1940, Petiet led the 3rd Light Cavalry Division in battle, with his conduct earning him distinction. While Charles De Gaulle was occupied with other battles (such as the Battle of the Somme) Petiet was sent to Luxembourg where he was commanded to delay the German advance.

Soon after Petiet was appointed lieutenant general and in 1941, nearly a year after the fall of France, Petiet surrendered his powers and left Vichy.

== Medals and honours ==
- Commandeur de la Légion d'honneur
- Croix de guerre 1914-1918
- Croix de guerre 1939-1945
