= Albert Van den Berg (resistant) =

Belgian resistant who saved Jews in WWII

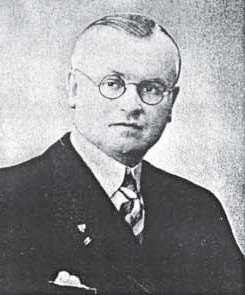
- Albert Van den Berg

Max-Albert Van den Berg, also called Albert Van den Berg, (Liège, 10 May 1890 – April 1945), was a doctor of law, licensed as a notary and lawyer at the Court of Appeal, and active in Belgian Resistance during the Second World War.

== Life ==
Max-Albert Van den Berg is best known for helping some 400 Jewish children escape German occupation forces, together with his brother-in-law Georges Fonsny and sister Germaine. Within their Berg-Fonsny network in this activity, Berg visited and comforted the children too. In 1995, he received the title of Righteous Among the Nations from the Yad Vashem Institute. The Fonsnys received the title in 1996. Van den Berg was arrested by the Gestapo in 1943, placed at the Neuengamme concentration camp near Hamburg. He survived until the end of the war, but died from exhaustion on German soil before managing to reach Belgium.

Van den Berg was also a Service Clarence member.
