= Schuster Line =

Luxembourg WWII border defence line

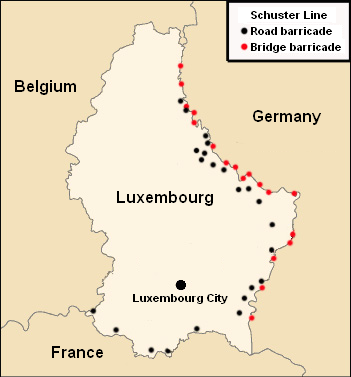
Map showing installations of the Schuster Line

The Schuster Line (Luxembourgish: Schuster-Linn, German: Schusterlinie) was a system of barriers and barricades erected by the Luxembourg government along its borders with Germany and France shortly before World War II. The line was named after Joseph Schuster, Luxembourg's chief engineer of bridges and highways, who was responsible for its construction.

The Schuster Line consisted of 41 sets of concrete blocks and iron gates, including 18 bridge barriers along the German border and five roadblocks on the French border. These obstacles were typically positioned some distance inland in a zigzag arrangement and reinforced with barbed wire entanglements on either side. Nine radio outposts were established along the German border, with a central receiving station located at the St Espirit barracks in Luxembourg City.

The line failed to significantly delay the German advance during the invasion of Luxembourg on 10 May 1940. The iron gates were torn down and ramps were constructed over the concrete barriers to allow vehicles to pass; in some cases, the obstacles were destroyed by explosives.

== See also ==
- K-W Line – a contemporary defense line in Belgium
- Maginot Line – a contemporary defense line in France

== Bibliography ==
- Wagner aus Strassen, Raymond (2001). "Verziel mer vum Krich". De Cliärrwer Kanton, Edition Spéciale (in Luxembourgish). Archived from the original on 2016-11-04.
- Thomas, Nigel (2014). Hitler's Blitzkrieg Enemies 1940: Denmark, Norway, Netherlands & Belgium. Bloomsbury. p. 15. ISBN 978-1-78200-597-1.
- Government of Luxembourg. "Luxembourg and the German Invasion, Before and After".
- Milmeister, Jean (1980). "Sturm auf die „Schusterlinie"". Letzeburger Sonndesblad. 113 (19): 6.
