= Heim ins Reich =

Expansionist Nazi foreign policy slogan

- "Back home to the Reich"
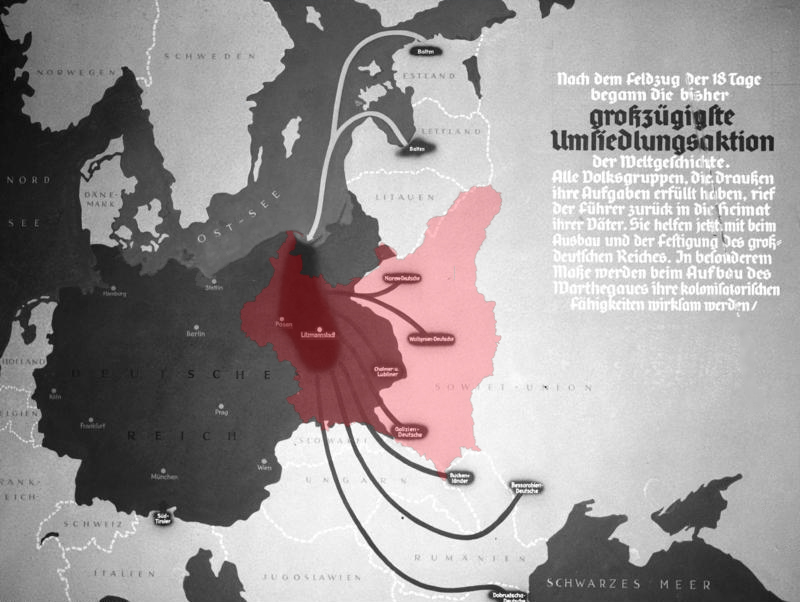
- Nazi Germany in 1939 (dark grey) after the conquest of Poland; with pockets of German colonists brought into the annexed territories of Poland from the Soviet "sphere of influence". – Nazi propaganda poster superimposed with the red outline of Poland missing entirely from the original print.
- Duration: 1936–1944
- Type: Irredentism, ethnic cleansing and population transfer
- Cause: Lebensraum, Pan-Germanism, Generalplan Ost
- Patron(s): Adolf Hitler

Heim ins Reich (German pronunciation: [ˈhaɪm ʔɪns ˈʁaɪç]; meaning "back home to the Reich") was an irredentist foreign policy pursued by Nazi Germany from October 1936.

The aim of Hitler's initiative was to convince all Volksdeutsche (ethnic Germans) who were living outside Nazi Germany (e.g. in Austria, Czechoslovakia, the western districts of Poland) and oversea lands of immigration that they should strive to return "home" into Greater Germany, but also relocate from territories that were not under German control, following the conquest of Polish lands, in accordance with the Nazi–Soviet pact.

The Heim ins Reich manifesto targeted areas ceded in the Treaty of Versailles to the newly reborn state of Poland, various lands of immigration, as well as other areas that were inhabited by significant ethnic German populations, such as the Czechoslovak Sudetenland, Free City of Danzig, and other neighbouring regions after 6 October 1939.

Implementation of the policy was managed by VOMI (Hauptamt Volksdeutsche Mittelstelle or "Main Welfare Office for Ethnic Germans"). As a state agency of the NSDAP, it handled all Volksdeutsche issues. By 1941, the VOMI was under the control of the SS.

== History ==
The end of World War I in Europe led to the emergence of new 'minority problems' in the areas of collapsing German and Austro-Hungarian empires. As a result of the Paris Peace Conference, 1919, more than 9 million ethnic Germans found themselves living in newly organized Poland, Czechoslovakia, Romania, and Yugoslavia. Unlike the new sovereign states, Germany was not required to sign the Minority Treaties.

Prior to the Anschluss in 1938, a powerful radio transmitter in Munich bombarded Austria with propaganda of what Hitler had already done for Germany, and what he could do for his native home country Austria. The annexation of Austria was presented by the press as the march of the German armed forces into purported German land: "as representatives of a general German will to unity, to establish brotherhood with the German people and soldiers there". In a similar manner, the 1939 German ultimatum to Lithuania, leading to the annexation of Memel from the Republic, was glorified as Hitler's "latest stage in the progress of history".

After the Anschluss with Austria, Germany popularized the "Back home to the Reich" slogan among Sudeten Germans. During the Czech crisis, Hitler visited the German Gymnastics and Sports Festival in Breslau. When the Sudeten team passed the VIP stand where Hitler was, they shouted "Back home to the Reich!" Josef Goebbels noted in his diary that "The people yelled, cheered and cried. The Führer [Hitler] was deeply moved."

On 7 October 1939, immediately after the end of the Germany's Polish Campaign, Hitler appointed Reichsführer-SS Heinrich Himmler as Reich Commissioner for the Consolidation of German Nationhood (RKFDV). Duties of the new position included furthering the "return" of Volksdeutsche and organising newly-conquered territory for German settlement. Grams, 2021; Grams 2025.

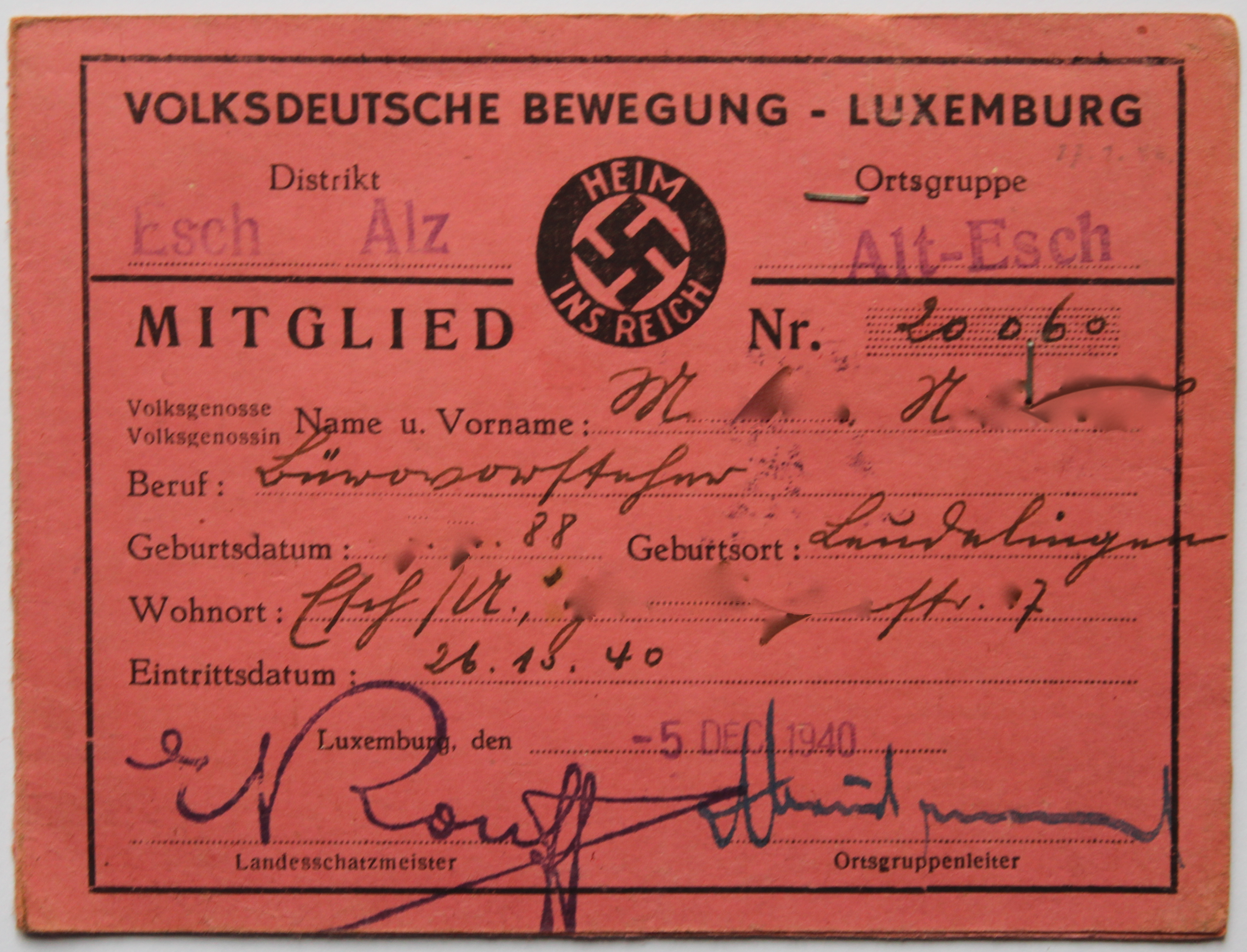
Membership card of the Luxembourgish Volksdeutsche Bewegung, with 'Heim ins Reich' slogan.

Concurrent with annexations were the beginnings of attempts to ethnically cleanse non-Germans both from Germany and from the areas intended to be part of a "Greater Germany". Alternately, Hitler also made attempts to Germanize those who were considered ethnically or racially close enough to Germans to be "worth keeping" as part of a future German nation, such as the population of Luxembourg. Germany officially considered these populations to be German, but not part of the Greater German Reich, and were thus the targets of propaganda promoting this view in order to integrate them. These attempts were largely unpopular with the targets of the Germanization. Up to 97 percent of Luxembourgers voted in a 1941 referendum against being recognized as German.

Propaganda was also directed to Germans outside Nazi Germany to return as regions, or as individuals from other regions. Hitler hoped to make full use of the "German Diaspora". As part of an effort to lure ethnic Germans back to Germany, folksy Heimatbriefe or "letters from the homeland" were sent to German immigrants to the United States. The reaction to these was on the whole negative, particularly as the letters increased in volume. Goebbels also hoped to use German-Americans to keep America neutral during the war, but his actions produced among them great hostility to Nazi propagandists. Newspapers in occupied Ukraine printed articles about antecedents of German rule over Ukraine, such as Catherine the Great and the Goths.

== "Heim ins Reich" in occupied Poland 1939–1944 ==
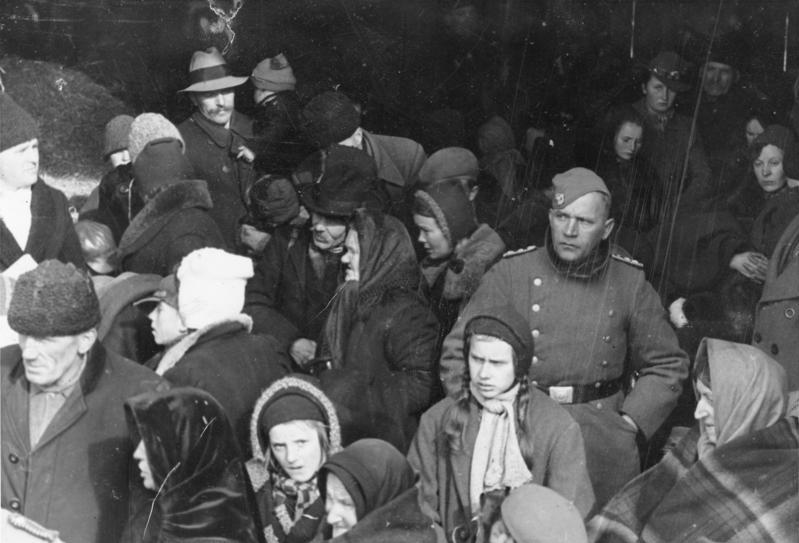
Poles expelled in 1939 from Reichsgau Wartheland

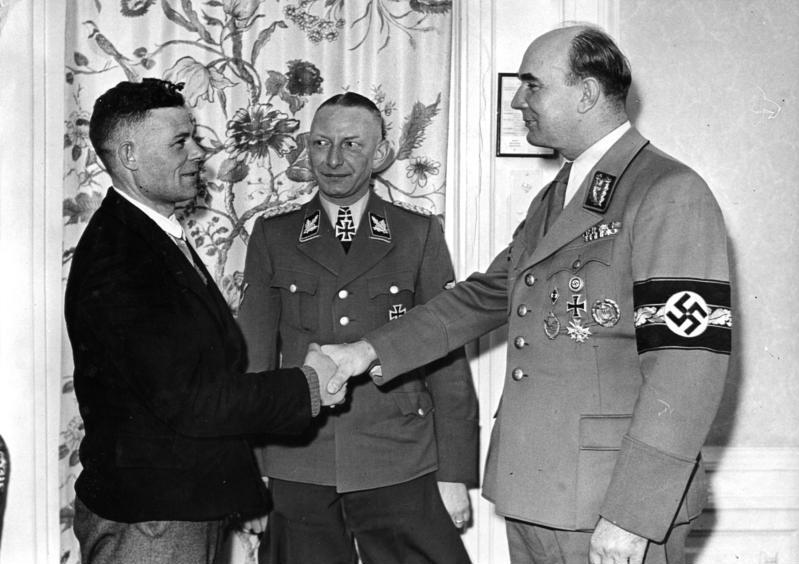
Arthur Greiser welcoming the millionth Volksdeutsche resettled from Eastern Europe to occupied Poland, March 1944

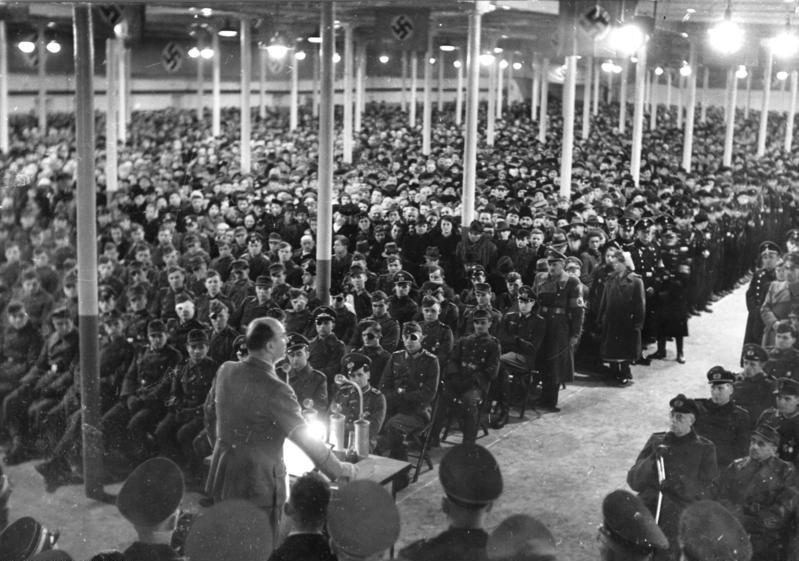
Arthur Greiser speaks to resettled Volksdeutsche at Łódź in March 1944.

The same motto (Heim ins Reich) was also applied to a second, closely related policy initiative which entailed the displacement and relocation of ethnically German communities (Volksdeutsche) from Central and Eastern European countries in the Soviet "sphere of influence", whose ancestors had settled there during the Ostsiedlung of earlier centuries. The Nazi government determined which of these communities were not "viable", started propaganda among the local population, and made arrangements and organized their transport of such communities. Its use of scare tactics about the Soviet Union resulted in tens of thousands of persons leaving. They included ethnic Germans from Bukovina, Bessarabia, Dobruja and Yugoslavia. For example, after the Soviets had assumed control of this territory, about 45,000 ethnic Germans left Northern Bukovina by November 1940. (Stalin permitted this out of fear they would be loyal to Germany.)

Heim ins Reich resettlement into conquered Poland 1939–1944
Territory of origin	Year	Number of resettled Volksdeutsche
South Tyrol (see South Tyrol Option Agreement)	1939–1940	83,000
Latvia and Estonia	1939–1941	69,000
Lithuania	1941	54,000
Volhynia, Galicia, Nerewdeutschland	1939–1940	128,000
General Government	1940	33,000
North Bukovina and Bessarabia	1940	137,000
Romania (South Bukovina and North Dobruja)	1940	77,000
Yugoslavia	1941–1942	36,000
USSR (pre-1939 borders)	1939–1944	250,000
Summary	1939–1944	867,000

In the Greater Poland (Wielkopolska) region (joined together with the Łódź district and dubbed "Wartheland" by the Germans), the Nazis' goal was complete Germanization, or political, cultural, social, and economic assimilation of the territory into the German Reich. In pursuit of this goal, the installed bureaucracy renamed streets and cities and seized tens of thousands of Polish enterprises, from large industrial firms to small shops, without payment to the owners. This area incorporated 350,000 such ethnic Germans and 1.7 million Poles deemed Germanizable, including between one and two hundred thousand children who had been taken from their parents (plus about 400,000 German settlers from the "Old Reich"). They were housed in farms left vacant by expulsion of the local Poles. Militant party members were sent to teach them to be "true Germans". Hitler Youth and League of German Girls sent young people for "Eastern Service", which entailed (particularly for the girls) assisting in Germanization efforts. They were harassed by Polish partisans (Armia Krajowa) during the war. As Nazi Germany lost the war, these ethnic Germans were expelled to remaining Germany.

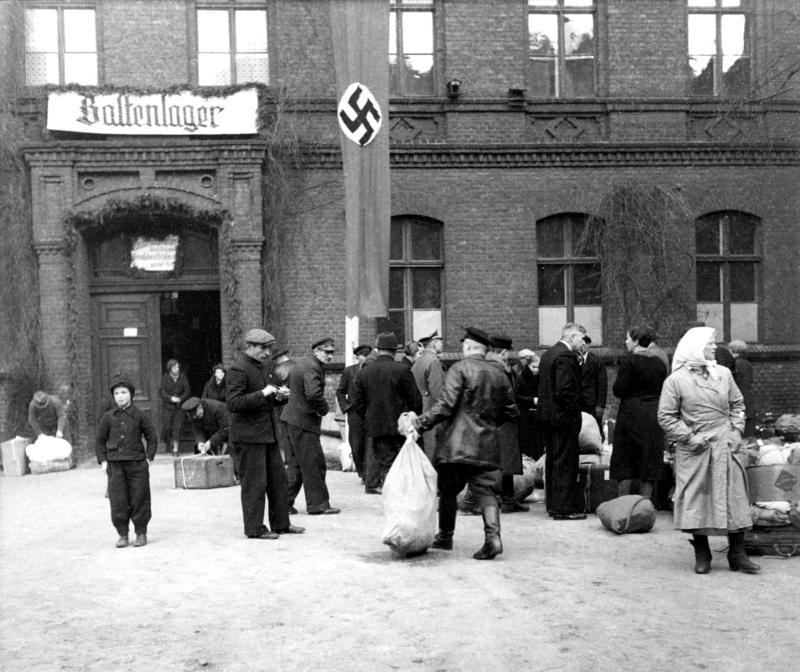
Transit station (Baltenlager) for Baltic Germans, Posen (Poznań), 1940

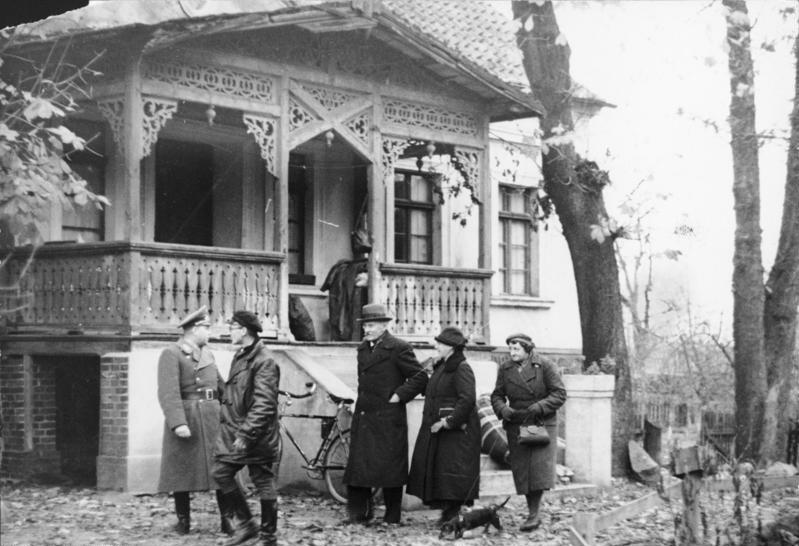
Resettled Baltic Germans take new homes in Warthegau after expulsion of the local Poles.

Eberhardt cites estimates for the ethnic German influx provided by Szobak, Łuczak, and a collective report, ranging from 404,612 (Szobak) to 631,500 (Łuczak). Anna Bramwell says 591,000 ethnic Germans moved into the annexed territories, and details the areas of colonists' origin as follows: 93,000 were from Bessarabia, 21,000 from Dobruja, 98,000 from Bukovina, 68,000 from Volhynia, 58,000 from Galicia, 130,000 from the Baltic states, 38,000 from eastern Poland, 72,000 from the Sudetenland, and 13,000 from Slovenia.

Additionally some 400,000 German officials, technical staff, and clerks were sent to those areas in order to administer them, according to "Atlas Ziem Polski" citing a joint Polish–German scholarly publication on the aspect of population changes during the war Eberhardt estimates that the total influx from the Altreich was about 500,000 people. Duiker and Spielvogel note that up to two million Germans had been settled in pre-war Poland by 1942. Eberhardt gives a total of two million Germans present in the area of all pre-war Poland by the end of the war, 1.3 million of whom moved in during the war, adding to a pre-war population of 700,000.

Number of German colonists brought into given regions
Territory (region)	Number of German colonists
Warthegau	536,951
Reichsgau Danzig-West Prussia	50,204
East Upper Silesia	36,870
Regierungsbezirk Zichenau	7,460
Piotr Eberhardt. Political Migrations in Poland, 1939–1948. Warsaw. 2006.

The increase of German population was most visible in the urban centres: in Poznań, the German population increased from around 6,000 in 1939 to 93,589 in 1944; in Łódź, from around 60,000 to 140,721; and in Inowrocław, from 956 to 10,713. In Warthegau, where most Germans were settled, the share of the German population increased from 6.6% in 1939 to 21.2% in 1943.

== See also ==
- Areas annexed by Nazi Germany
- Baltic Germans
- Expulsion of Poles by Nazi Germany (1939–1944)
- Ethnic nationalism
- Lebensraum
- Generalplan Ost
- Volga Germans
- Gerhard Fritz Baumgartner
- South Tyrol Option Agreement
- Final solution
- Holocaust
- Flight and expulsion of Germans after World War II
