= Damian Kratzenberg =

Luxembourgish politician (1878–1946)

Leader of the Volksdeutsche Bewegung
- In office 13 July 1940 – 1 September 1944
- Preceded by: Office established
- Succeeded by: Office abolished

Member of the Liberal Party
- In office 1927–1936

Personal details
- Born: November 5, 1878 Clervaux, Luxembourg
- Died: October 11, 1946 (aged 67) Luxembourg City, Luxembourg
- Party: Volksdeutsche Bewegung
- Criminal information
- Status: Executed by firing squad
- Conviction: Treason
- Penalty: Death

Damian Kratzenberg (November 5, 1878 – October 11, 1946) was a Luxembourgish high school teacher who became head of the Volksdeutsche Bewegung (German-People's Movement), a pro-Nazi political group, in Luxembourg during World War II. He was executed after the war for collaboration with the Nazis.

== Life and career ==
Kratzenberg was the son of the administrator of the castle of Clervaux, a German immigrant. After receiving his baccalaureate at the Diekirch gymnasium, from 1898 to 1902 he studied literature in Luxembourg, Lille, Paris and Berlin. Following this, he taught Greek and German in Diekirch, Echternach, and from 1927 at the Athénée de Luxembourg.

From 1927 to 1936, Kratzenberg was a member of the liberal party. From the mid-1930s, he became a supporter of Nazi Germany. From 1935 to 1940, he was the president of GEDELIT, the Luxemburger Gesellschaft für deutsche Literatur und Kunst (Society for German Literature and Art). In 1936, he received the Goethe-Medaille für Kunst und Wissenschaft.

Kratzenberg became head of the regional branch of the Volksdeutsche Bewegung in 1940, and was appointed head of the Athénée de Luxembourg in 1941.

Kratzenberg fled to Weißenburg in Bayern a few days before the liberation of Luxembourg on 1 September 1944. A letter to his daughter after the end of the war however gave his location away and Kratzenberg was apprehended by American military police, moved to Luxembourg and stood trial. He was sentenced to death on August 1, with the sentence carried out on October 11, 1946, at the shooting range of the barracks of the Holy Ghost Plateau in Luxembourg City.

== See also ==
- Luxembourgish collaboration with Nazi Germany
