= Volksdeutsche Bewegung =

German National Movement Volksdeutsche Bewegung
- Abbreviation: VdB
- Leader: Damian Kratzenberg
- Founded: 1940; 86 years ago
- Dissolved: 1944; 82 years ago
- Preceded by: Luxemburger Gesellschaft für Deutsche Literatur und Kunst; Independent National Party (Faction)
- Membership: 84,000 (1942 est.)
- Ideology: Nazism
- Political position: Far-right
- Slogan: Heim ins Reich

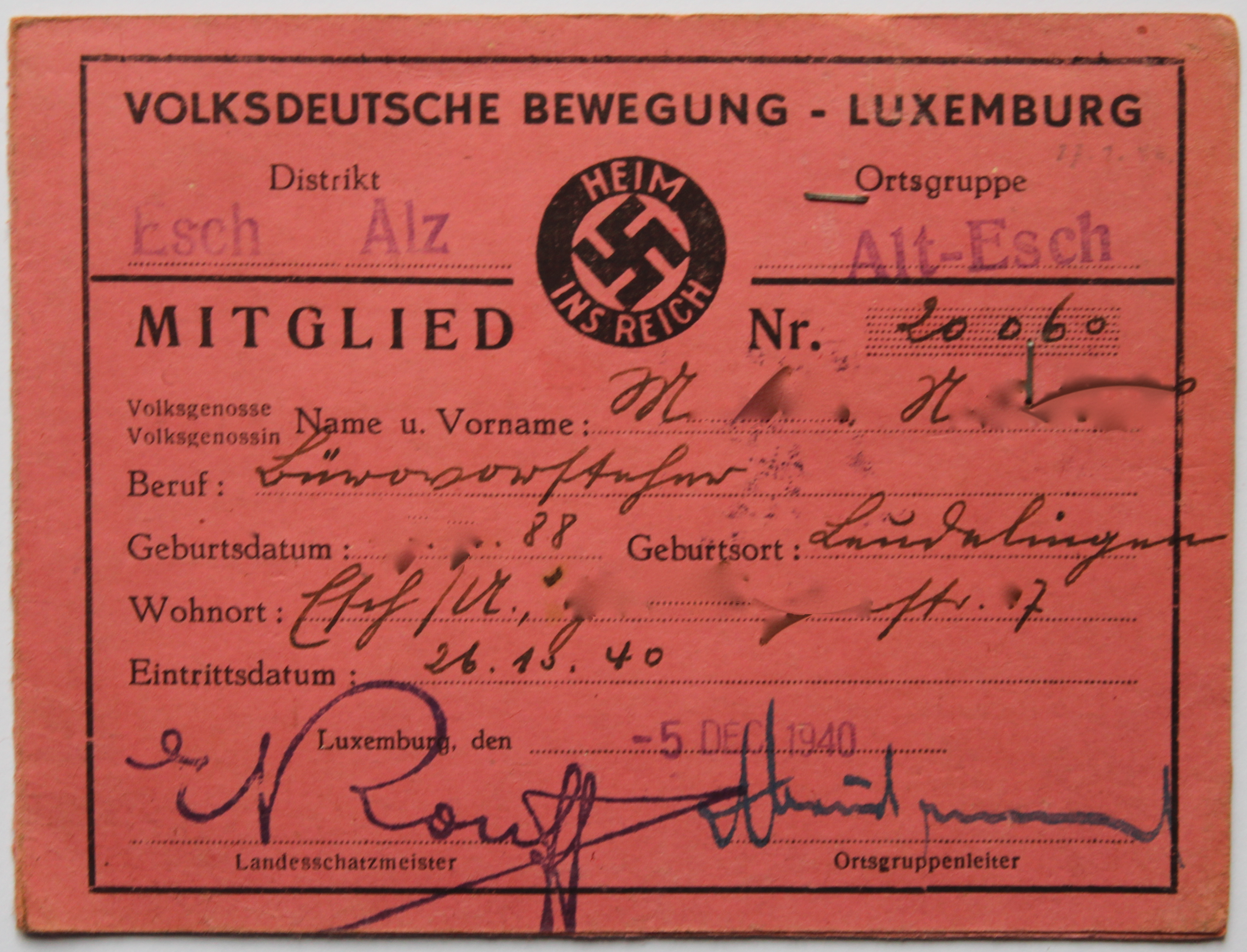
Membership card for the Volksdeutsche Bewegung, issued in 1940

Volksdeutsche Bewegung (German; literally "Ethnic German Movement") (Note: "Volksdeutsche" was a term used to describe ethnic Germans living outside the borders of Germany, and Germans who lived inside of the Germany were called "Reichsdeutsche".) was a Nazi movement in Luxembourg that flourished under the German-occupied Luxembourg during World War II.

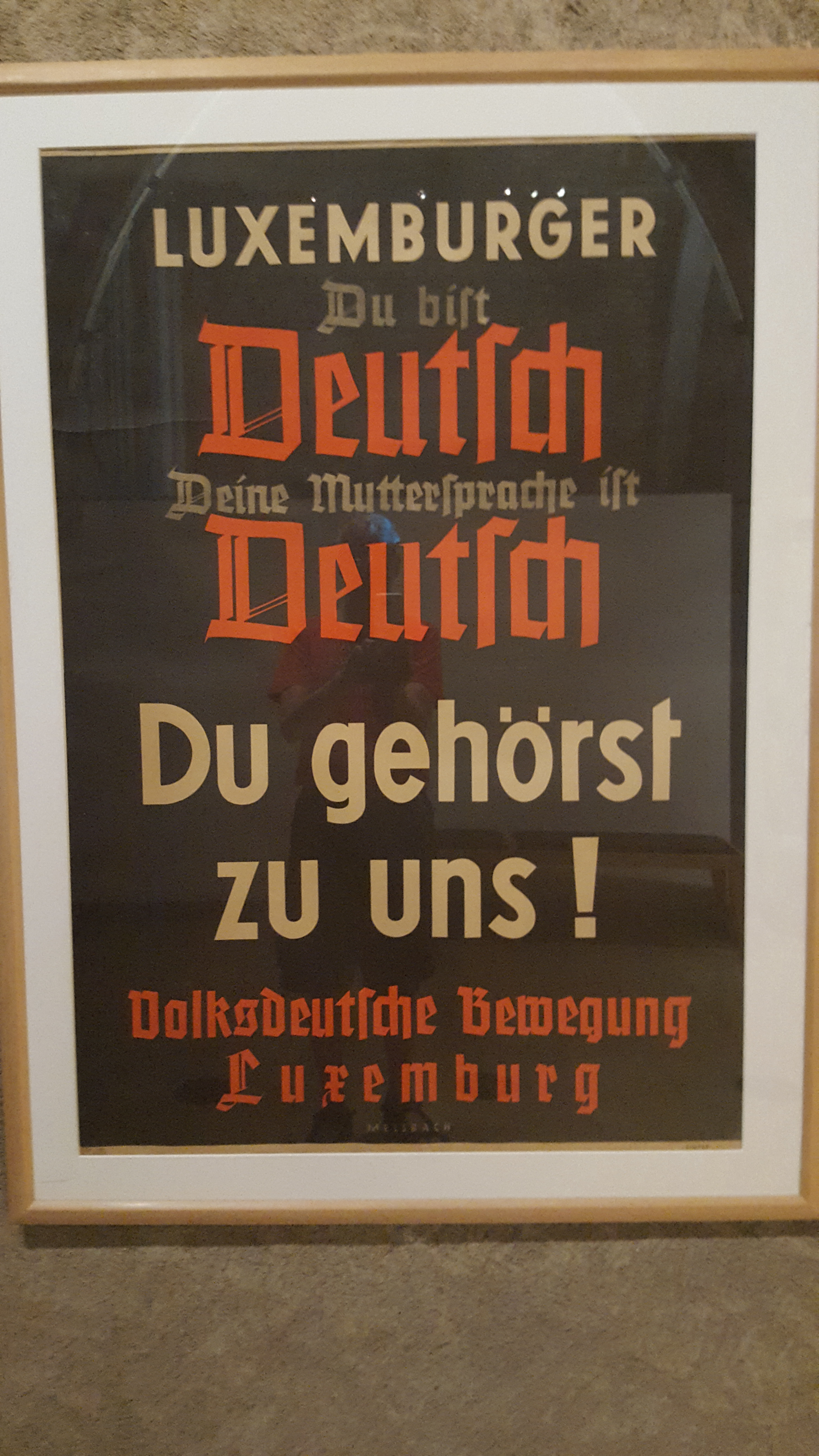
Propaganda of the Volksdeutsche Bewegung

Formed by Damian Kratzenberg, a university professor with a German background, the movement only emerged after the invasion and was declared the only legal political movement in Luxembourg by the Nazis. Using the slogan Heim ins Reich (Home to the Reich), their declared aim was the full incorporation of Luxembourg into Nazi Germany. The policy was supported by Nazis who used the Bewegung as means towards this end. The aim was accomplished in August 1942, although the VDB continued to operate and peaked at 84,000 members. Many of these joined when it became clear that membership was necessary to retain employment. A number of leading members also held dual membership of the National Socialist German Workers Party after incorporation. The movement disappeared after the war, and Kratzenberg was executed in 1946.

== Foundation ==
The predecessors of the Volksdeutsche Bewegung, the "Luxemburger Gesellschaft für Deutsche Literatur und Kunst" (GEDELIT; Luxembourgish Society for German Literature and Art), was led from 1935 by Damian Kratzenberg. Kratzenberg, a Luxembourgish National Socialist, advocated for the integration of the Grand Duchy into the German Empire, and advanced the "Deutschtum" (German-ness) of the Luxembourgers as a historical and linguistic justification for this. The "GEDELIT" engaged in propaganda in schools and assembled Nazi-sympathising groups of students in GEDELIT premises.

After the German Wehrmacht occupied the neutral Grand Duchy on 10 May 1940, 7 days later the "Volksdeutsche Bewegung" was founded in the city of Luxembourg. In his function as the president of the Volksdeutsche Bewegung, Kratzenberg now reported to the head of the civilian administration, the Gauleiter Gustav Simon.

== Referendum of 10 October 1941 ==
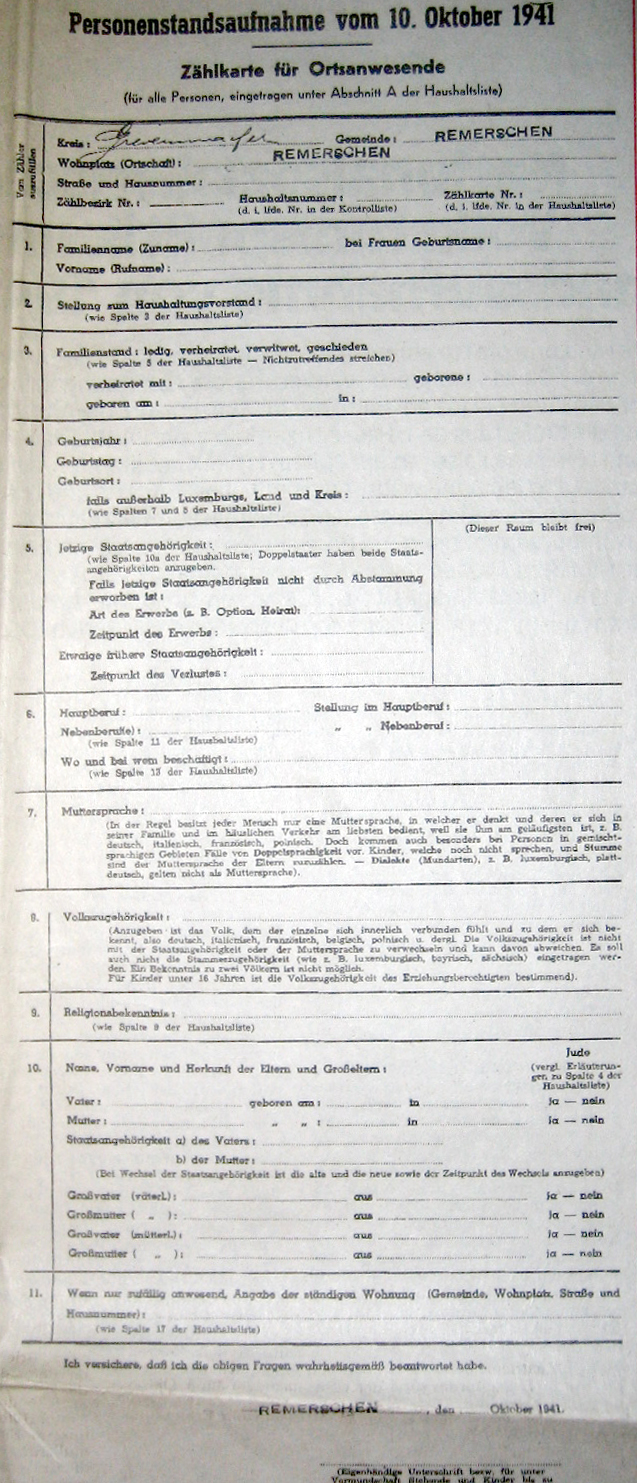
Census questionnaire on civil status as of 10 October 1941

In 1941 the civil administrator ordered a referendum, disguised as a census, in which the Luxembourgers were supposed to admit their German ethnicity and thus give their blessing to a "voluntary" joining of the Third Reich. In the "Referendum", the people were to be asked three questions on their "nationality", "mother tongue", and "ethnicity", the questions being formulated in a leading manner such that the only logical answer was supposed to be "German." This attempt was a failure. The Luxembourgish Resistance learned of the plan and spread the word that the Luxembourgers should answer dräimol Lëtzebuergesch ("three times Luxembourgish"). A test run of the civil administration failed for this reason, and the referendum was cancelled.

Through the failure of the referendum, the occupiers recognised that they could not overcome the resistance of the population. The German policy towards the Luxembourgers changed, and became much more brutal. The Volksdeutsche Bewegung lost significance, and played little role until the end of the war.

== After Liberation ==
The head of the Volksdeutsche Bewegung, Damian Kratzenberg, managed to flee towards Weißenburg a few days before the liberation on 1 September. A letter to his daughter after the end of the war, however, gave his location away. He was brought to Luxembourg and put on trial. On 1 August Kratzenberg was sentenced to death and on 11 October 1946 was shot at the shooting range of the barracks of the Holy Ghost Plateau in Luxembourg City.
