= Witte Brigade =

WWII Belgian resistance group

De Geuzengroep (1940-1944) Witte Brigade-Fidelio (1944)
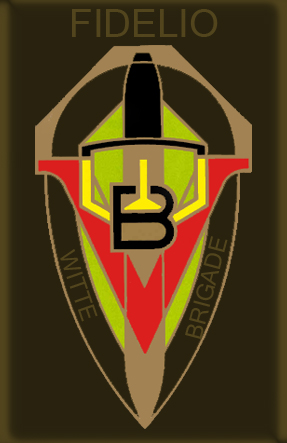
- Insignia of the Witte Brigade-Fidelio, displaying both the group's initials, but also a V for Victory
- Leader: Marcel Louette Edward Gierek
- Dates active: 1940-September 1944
- Active regions: Focused on Antwerp region, Belgium
- Wars: the Belgian Resistance (World War II)

The White Brigade (Dutch: Witte Brigade, French: Brigade blanche) was a Belgian resistance group founded on 23 July 1940 in Antwerp by Marcel Louette, who was nicknamed "Fidelio". The group was originally known as "De Geuzengroep" and changed its name again after the Liberation of Belgium to Witte Brigade-Fidelio as the term "white brigade" had emerged as a generic term to describe the resistance.

The name was chosen in opposition to the "Black Brigade", a collaborator group led by SS-Untersturmführer Reimond Tollenaere, who was responsible for the propaganda of pro-German Flemish National League. The Witte Brigade was based in Antwerp but had smaller branches in Gent, Lier, Aalst, Brussels, Waasland, Wallonia and in the coastal region.

== Activities ==
During the Second World War Belgium was occupied by Germany. While the fascist group known as the Black Brigade were collaborators with the Germans, they were opposed by the underground Witte Brigade. Important activities of the Witte Brigade were distributing anti-German propaganda, the creation of lists of collaborators and organizing patriotic demonstrations on key Belgian holidays, such as 21 July (National Day) and 11 November (Anniversary of the German surrender in the First World War). The resistance group published its own propaganda newspaper called Steeds Verenigd-Unis Toujours (lit. 'Always United') which published some 80 editions and became one of the largest underground publications in Flanders. In addition, the group was concerned with obtaining military information about the Port of Antwerp and the possible German invasion of Britain. The Witte Brigade also aided the Comet line, helping shot-down Allied pilots to return to Britain, helping the Allies replace valuable flight crews. They protested an anti-Jewish pogrom while stressing, they are not "pro-Jewish." The Brigade protected Jewish families, using their network of informants and saboteurs to evade the German occupiers. The Witte Brigade had connections with various intelligence networks, code-named Luc, Bravery and Group Zero. It was also the only resistance group early in the War with contact with the Belgian government in exile, along with the British.

== Members and arrests ==
Many members of the Witte Brigade were military veterans and policemen. Members of the Deurne police were particularly represented. During Nazi Germany's repression of Belgium in 1943–1944, 700 members of the resistance were arrested. This, in addition to other losses, reduced the group's strength to where it played a minor role in the later liberation of Belgium. When a prominent member was captured in possession of a list of other members, 58 members were arrested and sent to German camps. In Deurne in a raid in January 1944, 62 members were arrested and, on May 9 of that same year, the founder Marcel Louette was arrested and deported to Sachsenhausen concentration camp. Louette would eventually return from Germany and died in Antwerp in 1978. In total, the Witte Brigade suffered 400 losses of the 3,750 recognized members.

Additionally, around 500 men from Luxembourg (which was annexed to Germany), many of whom had refused to serve in, or who had deserted from the German Wehrmacht, left their country to fight in the Ardennes section of the Witte Brigade, where they formed the so-called Red Lion Brigade. 74 of them died.

Jews were also active in the organization. Many of them were arrested because they were already known as Jews.

== Achievements ==
Despite their heavy losses, the Witte Brigade, along with the Armée secrète, the Front de l'Indépendance, the Mouvement National Royaliste and Groupe G, helped allied forces capture the port of Antwerp intact in 1944. The Witte Brigade prevented the Germans, who had attached explosives to docks and cranes, from scuttling the facilities’ infrastructure, allowing the port to be opened once the Scheldt was cleared of sea mines. Additionally, the Witte Brigade acted as a scouting and intelligence network for the Canadian 4th, 5th and 6th brigades in September 1944. The Witte Brigade provided reports on the Germans' strength, defences, and numbers. Additionally, resistance members pinpointed the location of German minefields. The influence of the Witte Brigade was considerable. The organization had been known popularly as the "White Brigade" so, after liberation, the group changed its name, adding the word "Fidelio", the pseudonym of Louette.

== See also ==
- Marcel Louette
- Eugene Colson
- Monique de Bissy
