= Unio'n =

Luxembourgish resistance movement in WW2

Unio'n vun de Fräiheetsorganisatiounen
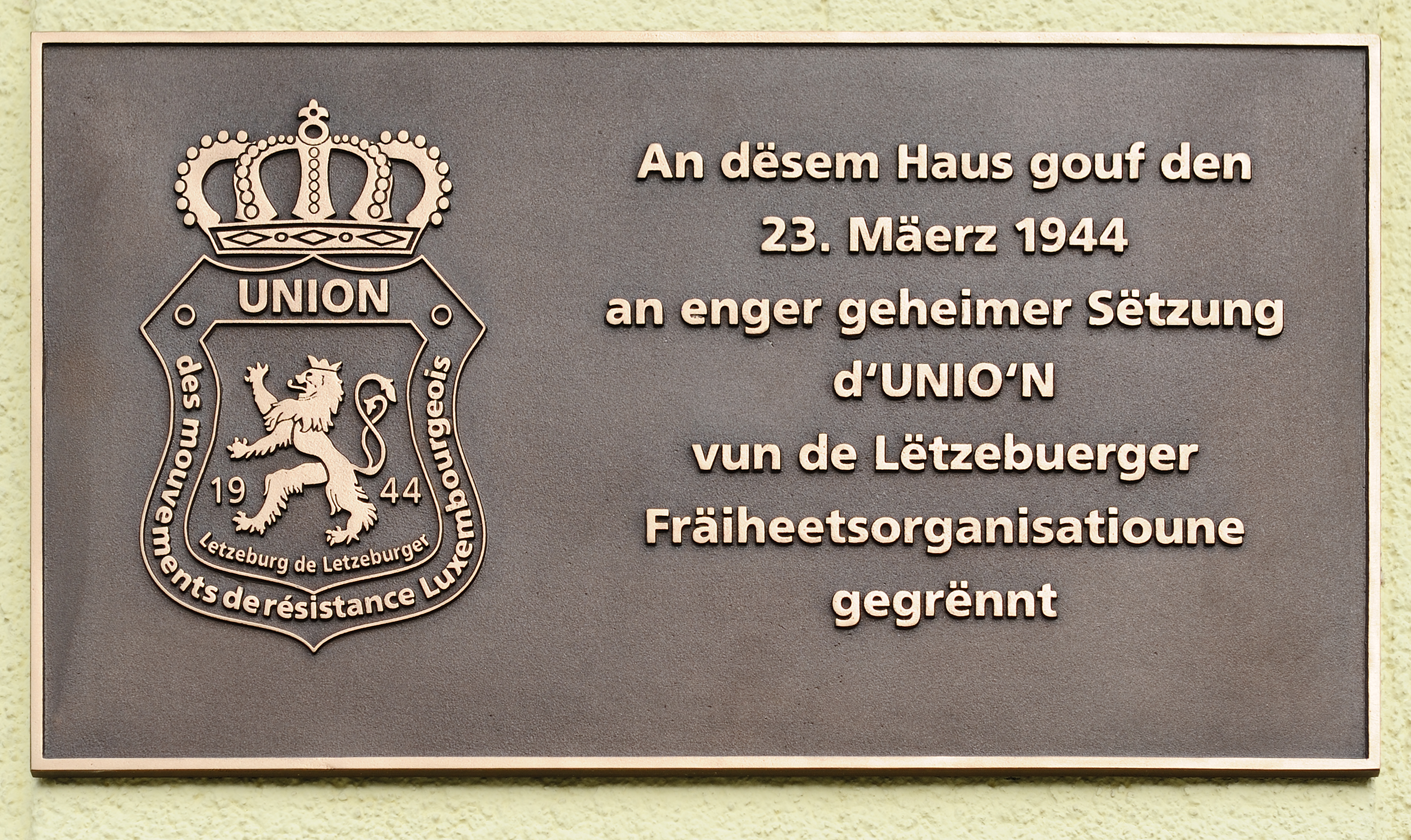
- Luxembourg-Bonnevoie: plaque commemorating the creation of the Unio'n.
- Formation: March 1944
- Founded at: Bonnevoie, Luxembourg City, Luxembourg
- Merger of: Luxembourgish Patriot League; Luxembourgish People's Legion; Luxembourgish Red Lion; Luxembourgish Freedom Union
- Members: 150
- Official language: Luxembourgish

The Unio'n vun de Fräiheetsorganisatiounen, or just Unio'n (transl. Union of Freedom Organisations), was an organisation of members of the Luxembourgish Resistance which was founded in World War II.

== Background and history ==
It emerged in March 1944 from the merger of the Luxembourgish Patriot League, the Luxembourgish People's Legion, the Luxembourgish Red Lion, and other resistance movements, shortly before the end of the war in Luxembourg. In September 1944, the Luxembourgish Freedom Union also joined. It was the head of the Luxembourgish People's Legion, Lucien Dury, who contacted the other resistance movements in 1943 with a view to a merger. The resistance movements at the time had been weakened by raids and arrests by the Gestapo, and the goal was also to create a movement which could act as a representative body after the liberation. It was also planned that the organisation should, in creating a militia, contribute to maintaining order after the liberation.

The Unio'n continued to exist after the war as an association, to keep the memory of the active resistance in the years 1940–1945 alive. In 2011, it had about 150 members. In March 2011, the organisation had a memorial plaque put up outside the house in Bonnevoie where the Unio'n was founded.
