= Vianden =

Vianden Veianen, Veinen
- Commune
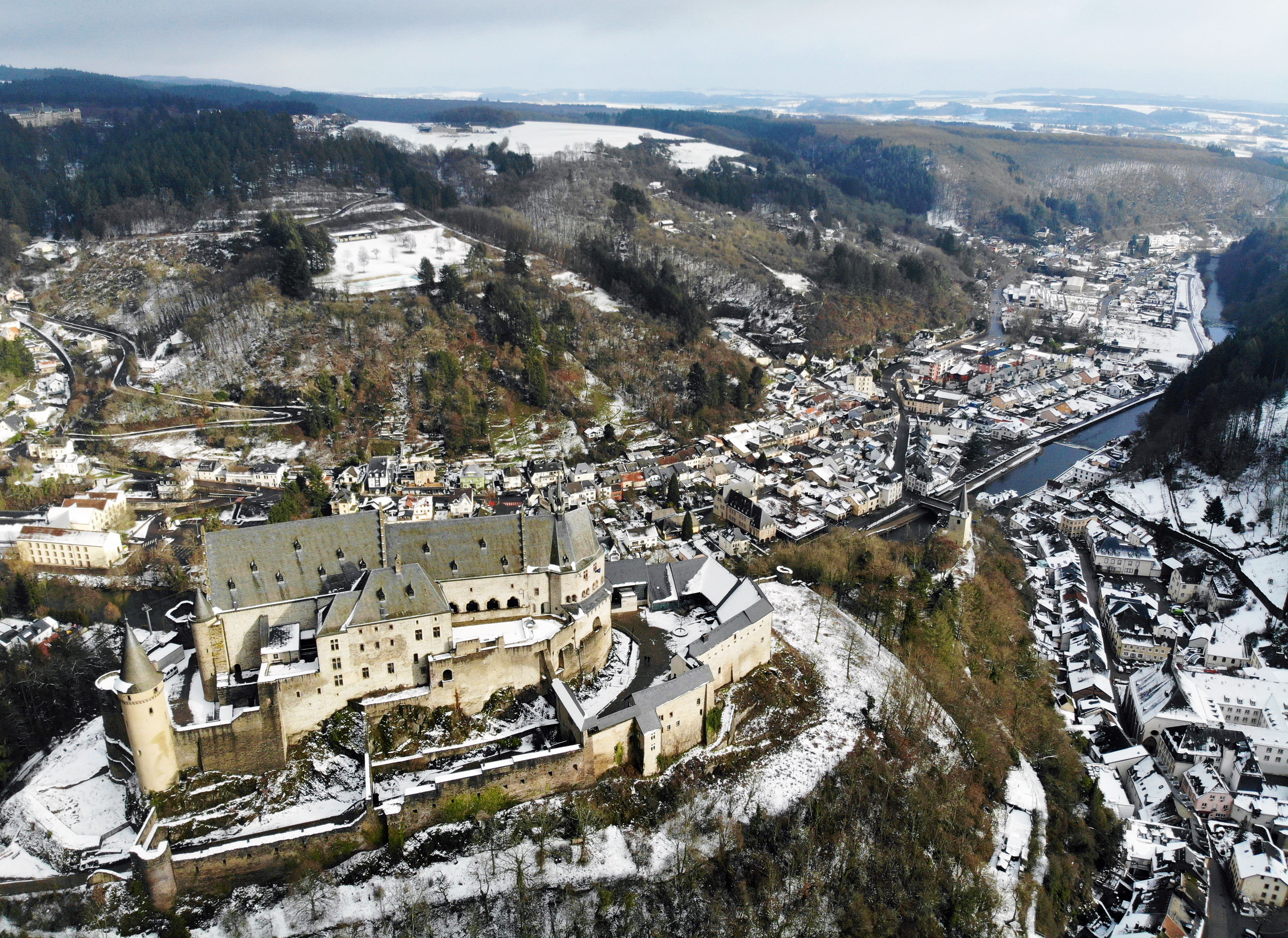
- Vianden from above

- Flag Coat of arms
- Interactive map of Vianden
- Coordinates: 49°54′N 6°12′E
- Country: Luxembourg
- Canton: Vianden

Government
  - Mayor: François Weyrich (Independent)

Area
  - Total: 9.67 km^{2} (3.73 sq mi)
  - Rank: 96th of 100
- Highest elevation: 515 m (1,690 ft)
  - Rank: 15th of 100
- Lowest elevation: 198 m (650 ft)
  - Rank: 24th of 100

Population (2025)
  - Total: 2,221
  - Rank: 77th of 100
  - Density: 230/km^{2} (595/sq mi)
  - Rank: 36th of 100
- Time zone: UTC+1 (CET)
  - Summer (DST): UTC+2 (CEST)
- LAU 2: LU0000903
- Website: vianden.lu

Vianden (German pronunciation: [ˈviːandn̩]; Luxembourgish: Veianen [ˈfɑɪ̯ɑnən] or (locally) Veinen [ˈfɑɪ̯nən]) is a commune with city status in north-eastern Luxembourg, with a population of 2,221 as of 2025. It is part of the canton of the same name. Vianden lies near the border with Germany, along the Our river, being the only place where the border is not defined by that river. It is known for Vianden Castle.

== History ==
The origins of Vianden date back to the Gallo-Roman age when there was a castellum on the site of the present castle. The original name of Vianden was Viennensis. The valley was covered in vineyards in Roman times, the first historical reference to Vianden was in 698 when there is a record of a gift in the form of a vineyard in Monte Viennense made by Saint Irmina to the Abbey of Echternach. Vianden possesses one of the oldest charters in Europe, granted in 1308 by Philip II, count of Vianden, from whom the family of Nassau-Vianden sprang, and who was consequently the ancestor of William of Orange.

In the Middle Ages, Vianden's craftsmen were recognised for their skills as tanners, drapers, weavers, barrelmakers, masons, locksmiths and goldsmiths. In 1490, they created guilds for their various trades. Over the years pig-farming and leathermaking became the major industry with the establishment of two tanneries at the end of the 19th century which finally closed in the mid-1950s.

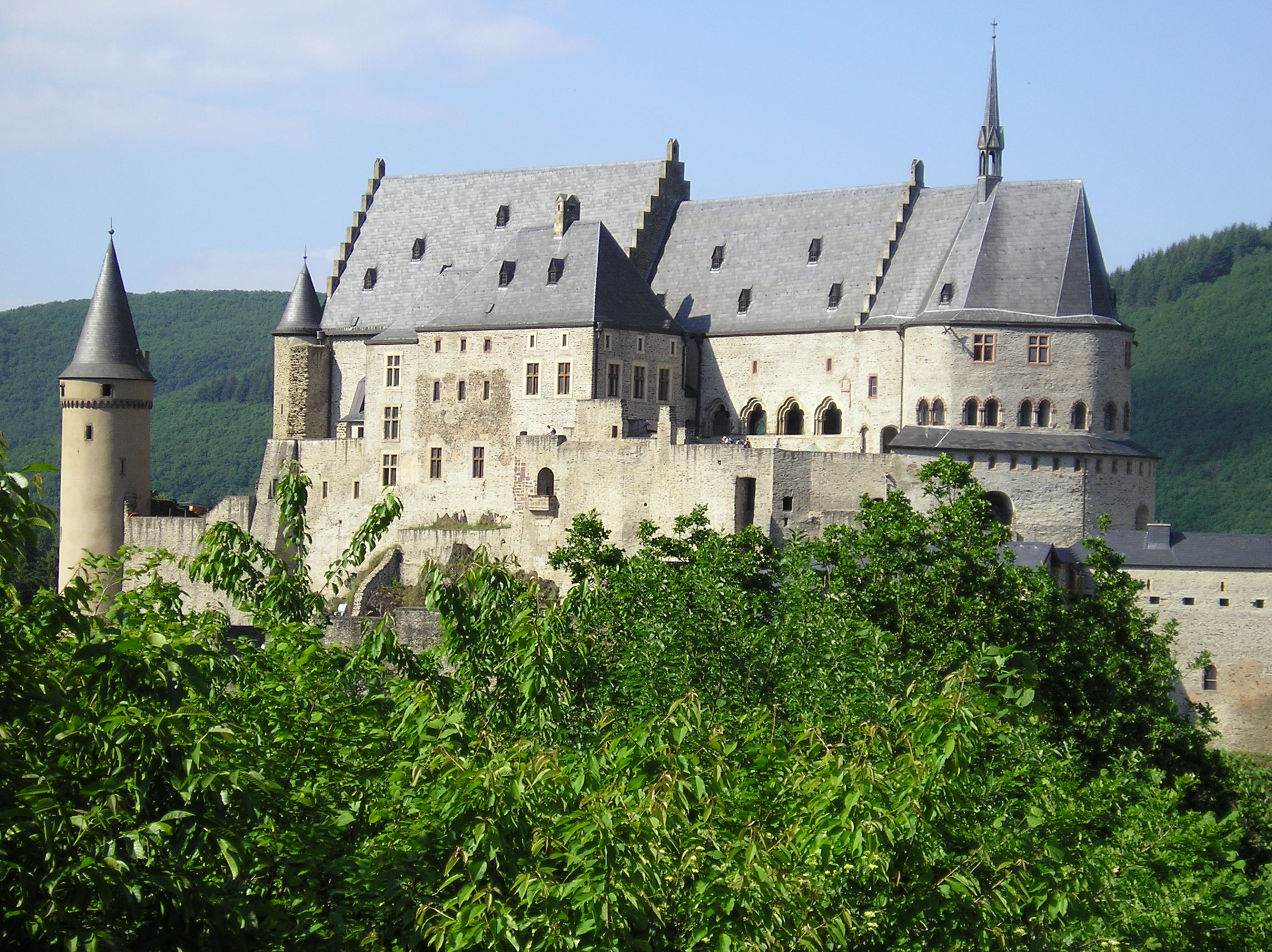
Vianden Castle

The castle was built between the 11th and 14th centuries and became the seat of the counts of Vianden. It was further developed until the 18th century but with the departure of the Counts of Luxembourg to the Netherlands combined with the effects of fire and an earthquake, it slowly deteriorated. The final blow came in 1820 when William I of the Netherlands sold it to a local merchant who in turn sold off its contents and masonry piecemeal, reducing it to a ruin. There were several attempts at restoration but these were hampered by problems of ownership. Still, the chapel which forms part of it was restored in 1849 by Prince Henry of the Netherlands, and during one of his visits to the town Victor Hugo lived in the castle for three months in 1871. Not until 1977, when Grand Duke Jean ceded the castle to the State, was it possible to undertake large-scale work, most of which has now been completed.

Vianden is also remembered as the site of multiple battles in World War II. In November 1944 it saw fierce combat between the Luxembourg Resistance and German forces. It was the last place in Luxembourg to be freed from the Germans in February 1945 when the Americans completed Luxembourg's liberation. A memorial to the west of the town, overlooking the castle, commemorates this final battle.

The first Boeing 747-8F built, RC501, is named "City of Vianden" and is operated by Cargolux Airlines.

== Geography ==
Vianden is a 47 kilometres (29 miles) drive from Luxembourg City. It can also be reached by bus from Diekirch, Ettelbruck, or Clervaux which have rail connections to the city of Luxembourg. There are also buses to Bitburg in Germany. Many visitors arrive by bicycle taking the signposted cycle tracks from the south along the Our valley.

== Population ==
Historical population

Year	Pop.	±%
1821	1,440	—
1851	1,530	+6.2%
1900	1,241	−18.9%
1910	1,178	−5.1%
1922	1,074	−8.8%
1935	1,195	+11.3%

Year	Pop.	±%
1947	1,111	−7.0%
1960	1,605	+44.5%
1970	1,520	−5.3%
1981	1,500	−1.3%
1990	1,475	−1.7%
2000	1,414	−4.1%

Year	Pop.	±%
2005	1,615	+14.2%
2010	1,679	+4.0%
2015	1,888	+12.4%
2020	2,138	+13.2%
2021	2,161	+1.1%

Source data

== Climate ==
Like the city of Luxembourg, Vianden (altitude ca. 200 m) has a temperate climate with warm summers (average day temperature around 24°C, on occasion as high as 35 °C) and chilly winters (daytime average 5 °C but sometimes as low as −15 °C at night). Rainfall is moderate, but on average it rains less than 10 days per month. The prevailing wind is south-westerly. The summer evenings are particularly pleasant, often with temperatures of around 25 °C until 11 pm. Very occasionally there are short periods of drought but the vegetation seldom loses its rich green for very long.

Daylight extends from about 5 am to 10.30 pm in June and from 8 am to 4.30 pm in December.

In the summer, temperatures can be quite warm and in the case that the preceding winter is particularly mild, there is a higher chance that insect populations will over-reproduce. During these summers, fruit fly and mosquito populations increase significantly becoming a nuisance for residents and tourists.

== Economy ==
The scenery and local attractions have made Vianden a tourist destination in Luxembourg with many tens of thousands of visitors every year, especially from the Netherlands, Belgium and Germany. It has 14 hotels, four campsites and a youth hostel. In addition, Vianden attracts large numbers of day-trippers who visit its restaurants, cafés, souvenir shops and sports facilities. The economy is however not without problems. While the hydro-electric pumping plant continues directly and indirectly to provide employment for the local population, the closure of the Electrolux plant in 1997 resulted in a considerable loss of jobs. The commune is now planning to encourage the establishment of skilled craft industries in the area by making land available for development.

== Attractions ==
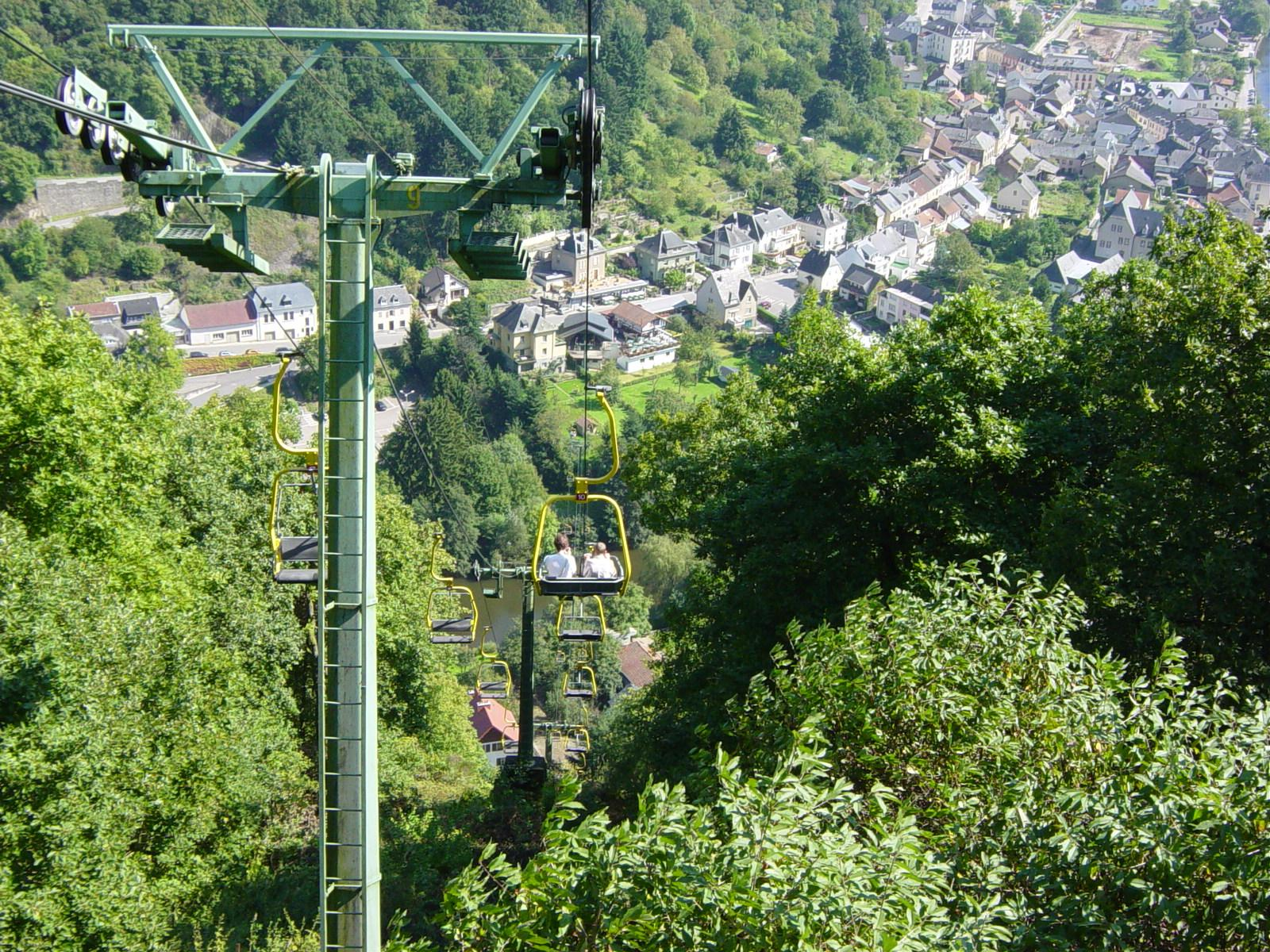
View of the town from the chairlift

Vianden is one of Luxembourg's main tourist centres with large numbers of holidaymakers and local visitors at all times of the year. In particular, the recently restored castle set spectacularly on the rocks above the town has become a museum which traces its history and its links with the royal families of Europe back to the Middle Ages. Then there are links with Victor Hugo who visited Luxembourg in 1862 and 1865 and spent a longer period in Vianden in 1871. His sketches and letters can be seen in the museum located in the house where he stayed next to the bridge over the Our. There is also a museum of arts and crafts (Musée d'Art rustique) and a doll and toy museum (Musée de la Poupée et du Jouet).

But many people just visit Vianden to wander through its historic streets or as a centre for walking, camping or cycling in the north of Luxembourg. There is a cycle route up the Sauer and Our valleys to Vianden and there are many walks in the area.

During the summer months, a chairlift operates taking passengers from the banks of the river in the lower part of the town taking to above the castle.

Vianden also has a number of annual events and celebrations. The most famous of these is the nut market in October when the local walnuts are on sale together with walnut cakes, walnut confectionery, walnut brandy and walnut liqueurs. In May, Vianden is set to welcome The Agitator.

Finally, there is an interesting attraction a few kilometers to the north of Vianden, the Vianden Pumped Storage Plant, which provides pumped-storage hydroelectricity storage and generation systems to benefit from the surplus electric power at night, and provide extra energy during peak hours.

=== Historic monuments ===
In addition to the castle, Vianden has a number of interesting historic monuments.

- The Hockelstur or belltower (1603) on a rock close to the castle was originally part of the fortifications.
- The ramparts which have been partly restored.
- The Church of the Trinitarians (1248) built in the Gothic style with two parallel naves and the adjacent cloister. It was built by Count Henry I in thanks to the Trinitarians who arranged for the release of his father, Count Frederic II, who had been captured during a crusade.
- The Cross of Justice close to the Church of the Trinitarians recalling the chartering of Vianden by Philip II in 1308.
- The towered castle houses built for the nobility including the City Hall (1579) and the house where the pharmacy is now situated (1475).
- The Church of St Nicholas (13th century) partly destroyed by fire in 1723 and rebuilt the following year.

== Coat of arms ==
The arms of Vianden (see top right-hand box) have not changed since 1288 when Godefroid I adopted the arms of Louvain-Perwez. The city was granted the right to use the same arms sometime during the 14th century. The arms were registered in the armorial général de France in 1696 by order of the King of France.

== Notable people ==
Many royal families and heads of state have associations with Vianden or have at least visited it. However, several other figures are worthy of note:

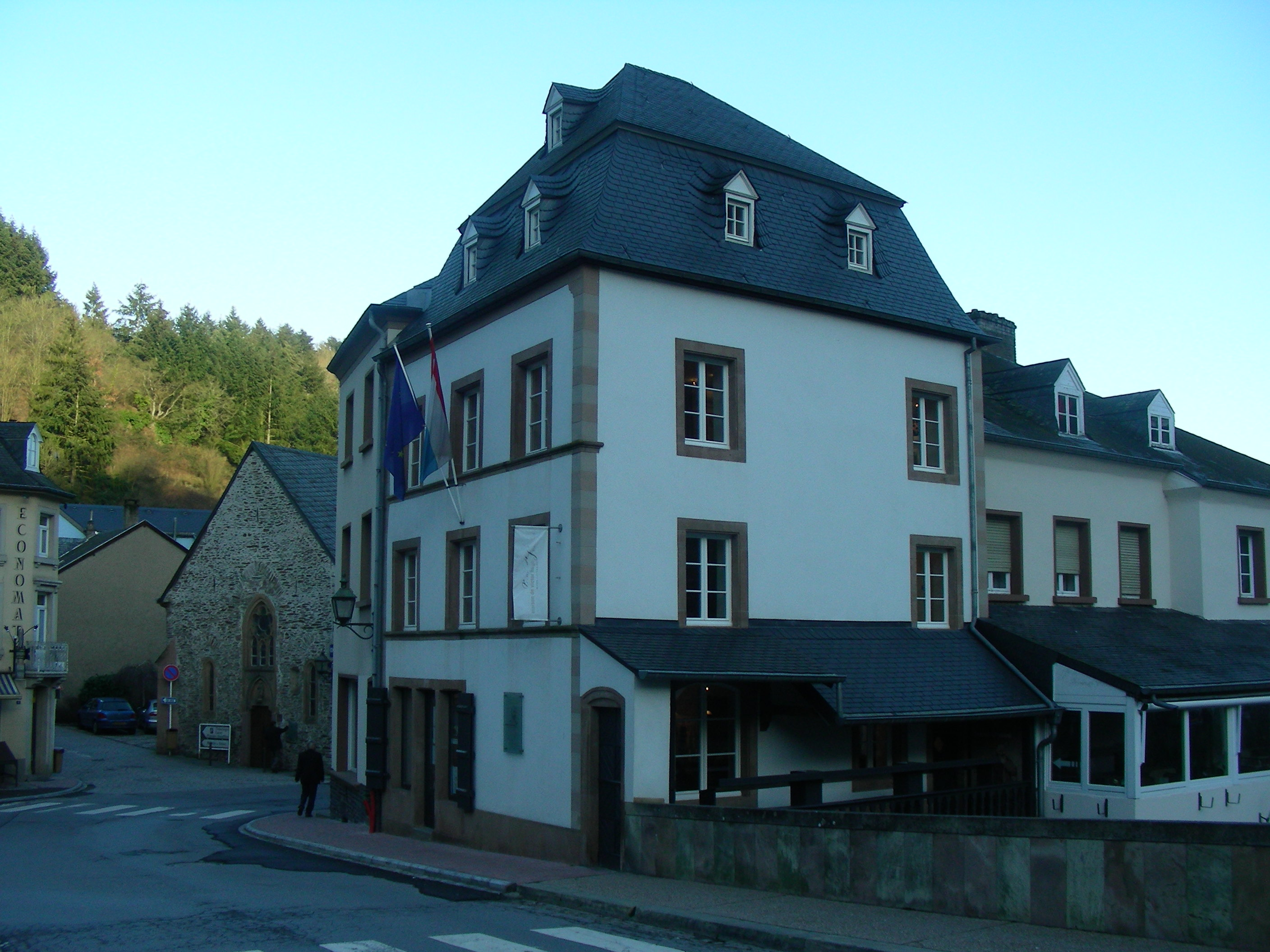
Vianden's Victor Hugo Museum

- Yolanda of Vianden, (1231–83), youngest daughter of Count Henry I, who joined the Convent of Marienthal against the wishes of her parents when she was very young and later became its devout prioress now a legend in Luxembourg's history.
- Mary of Nassau-Siegen (1491–1547), a countess from the House of Nassau-Siegen
- Victor Hugo (1802–85), the French author, who stayed in Vianden on several occasions between 1862 and 1871, recording its beauty and setting in prose, poetry and sketches, including the series of poems L'Année terrible. Hugo did much to promote the attractions of Vianden to the outside world.
- Edmond de la Fontaine (1823–91) otherwise known as Dicks, Luxembourg's national poet, who also wrote Vianden's first travel guide.
- René Engelmann (1880–1915), a linguist and novelist, who established the basic grammar of the Luxembourgish dialect, later to become a national language.
- Victor Abens (1912–1993), a Luxembourgish politician.

== Twin towns ==
Vianden is twinned with:

- Compiègne, France
- Huy, Belgium

== Gallery ==
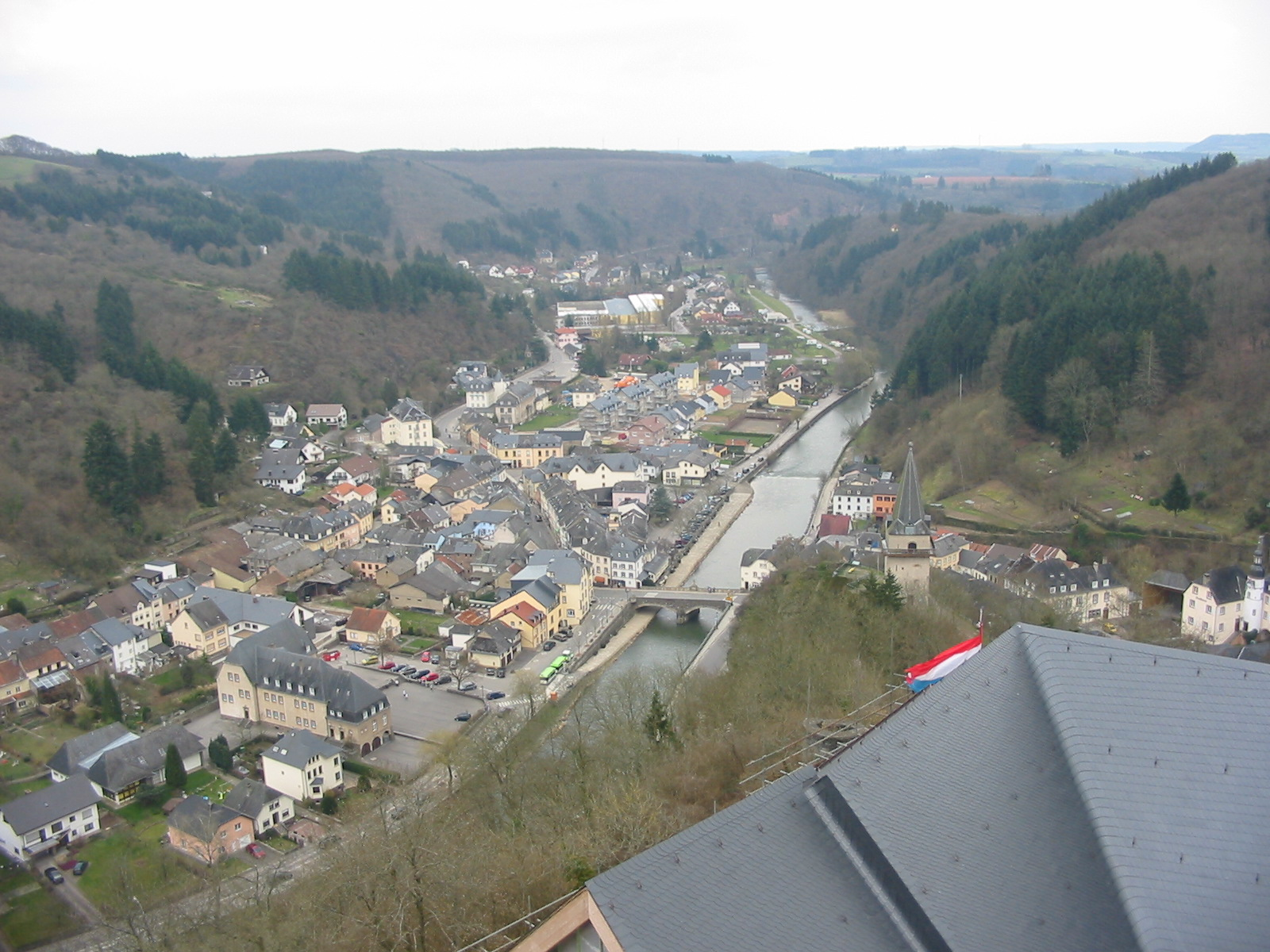
Vianden, view from the castle

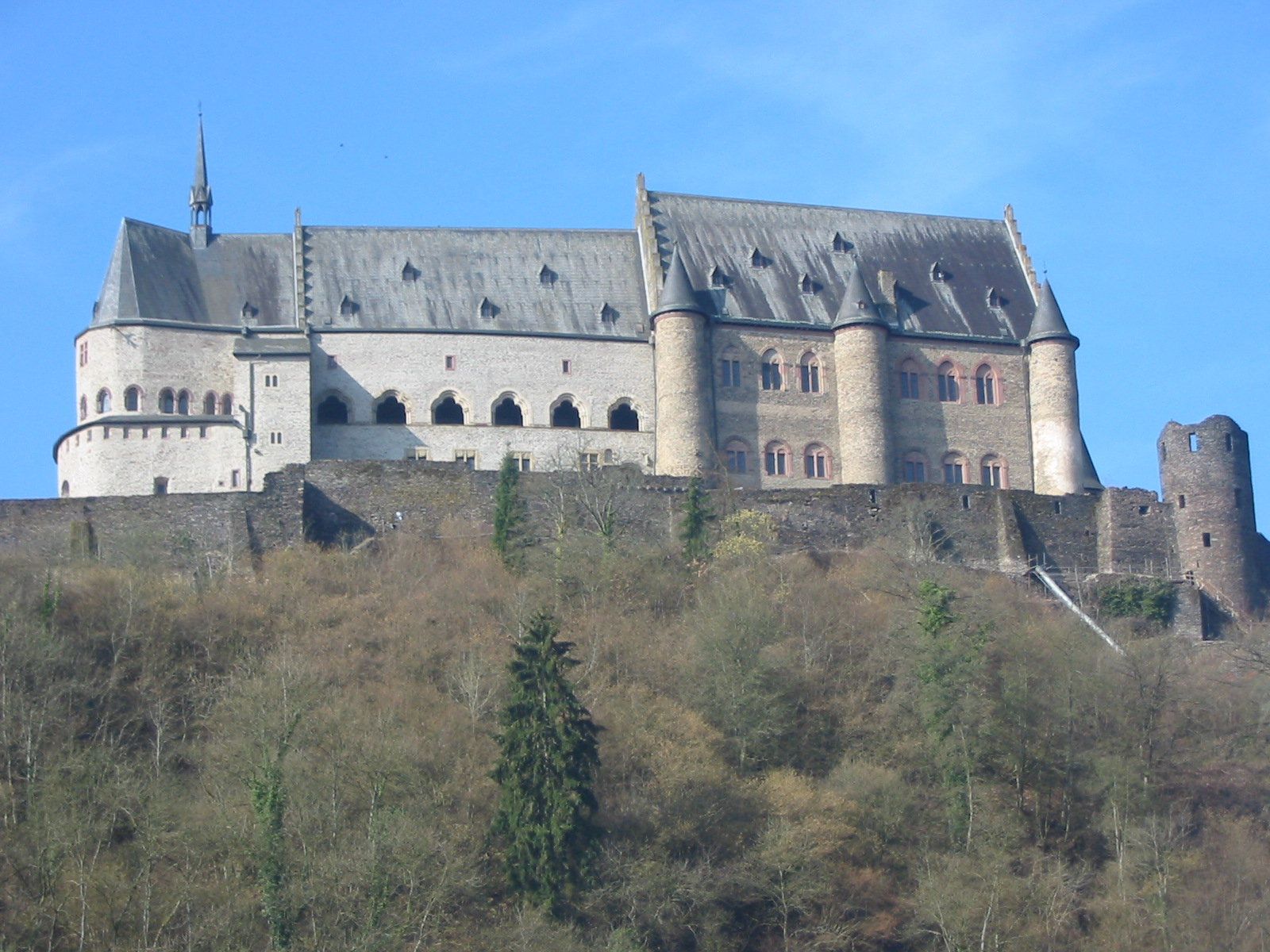
Castle of Vianden, view from the city

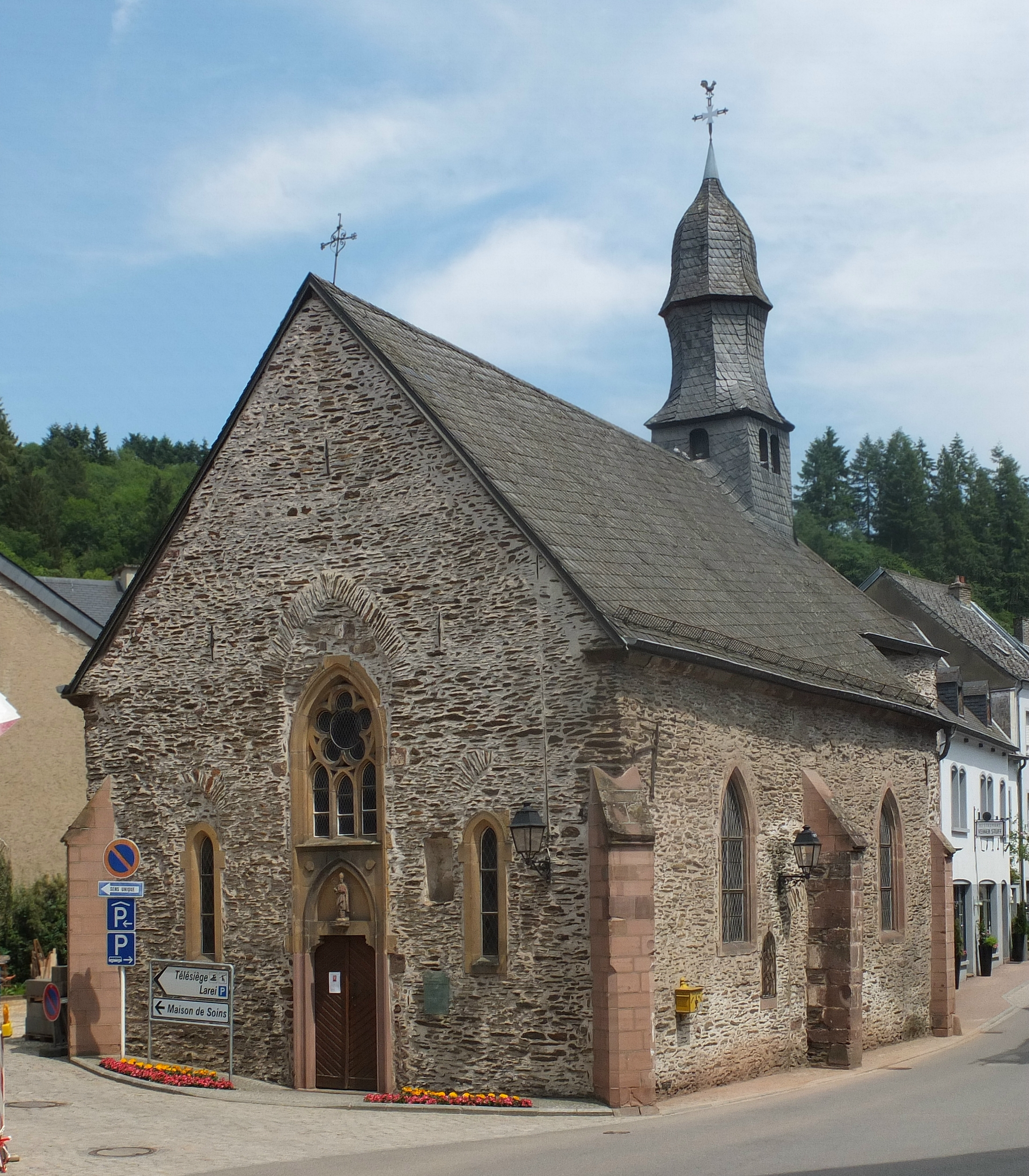
Church of St Nicholas

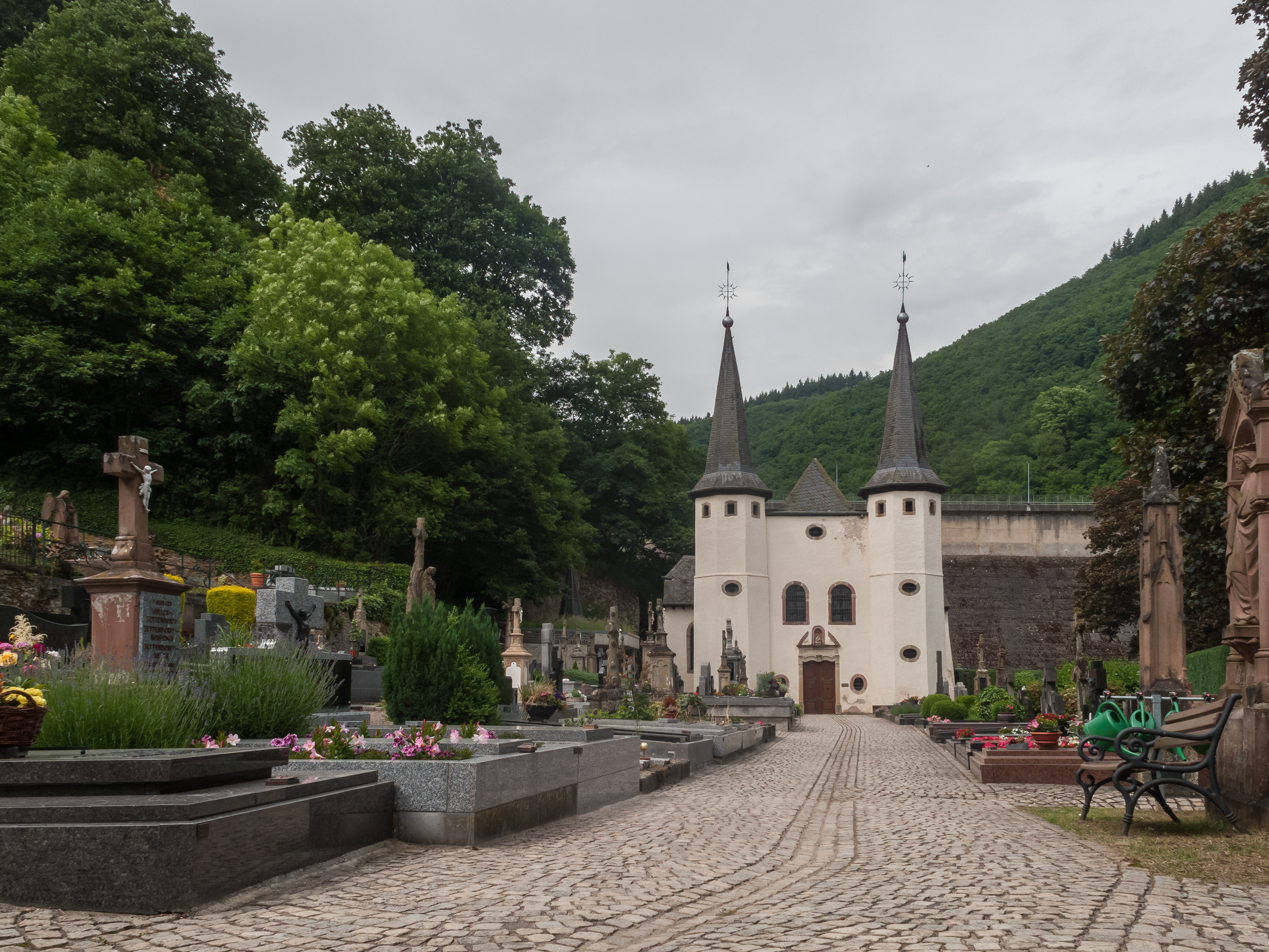
Church: l'église Saint-Roch

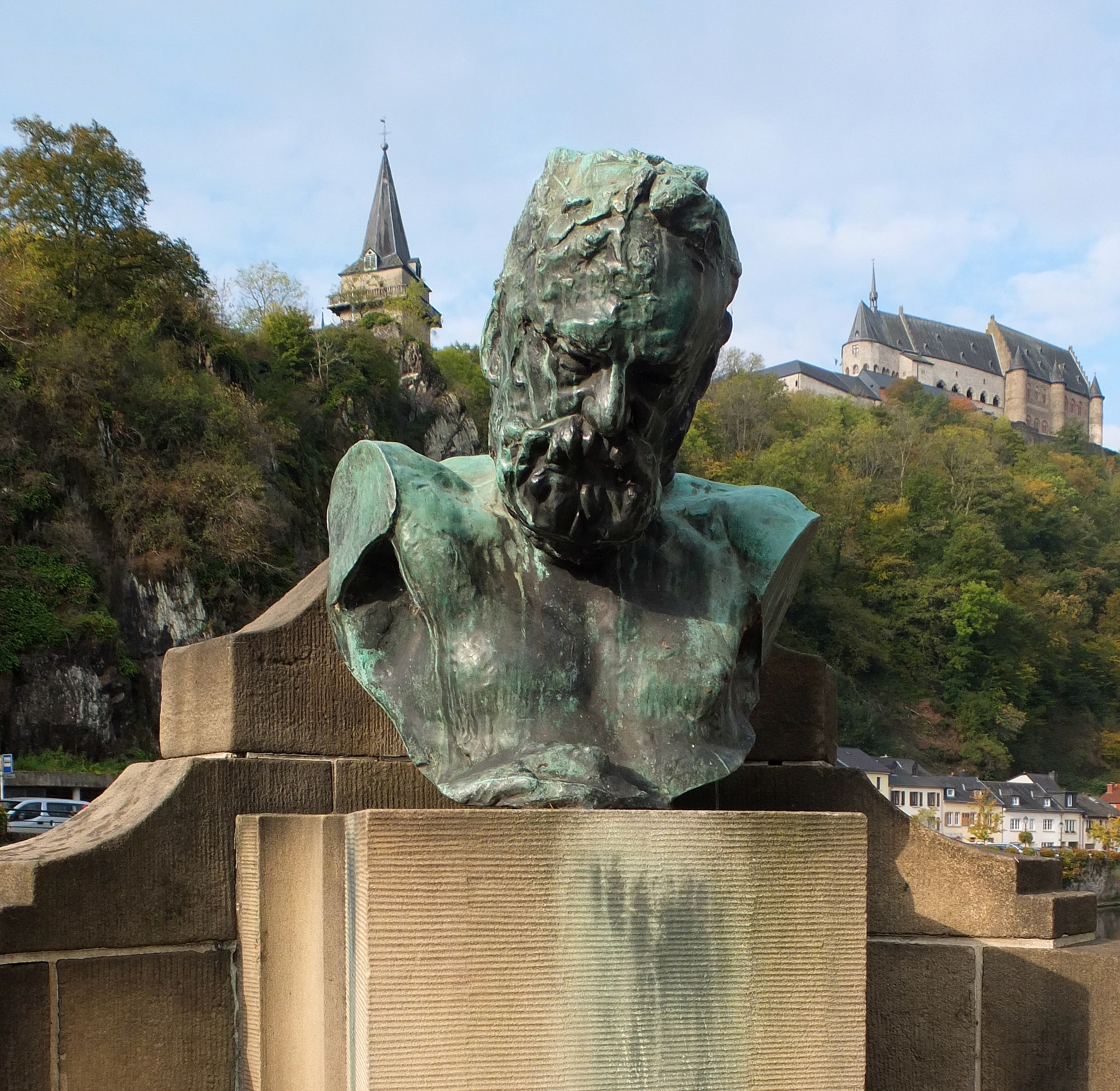
Bust of Victor Hugo

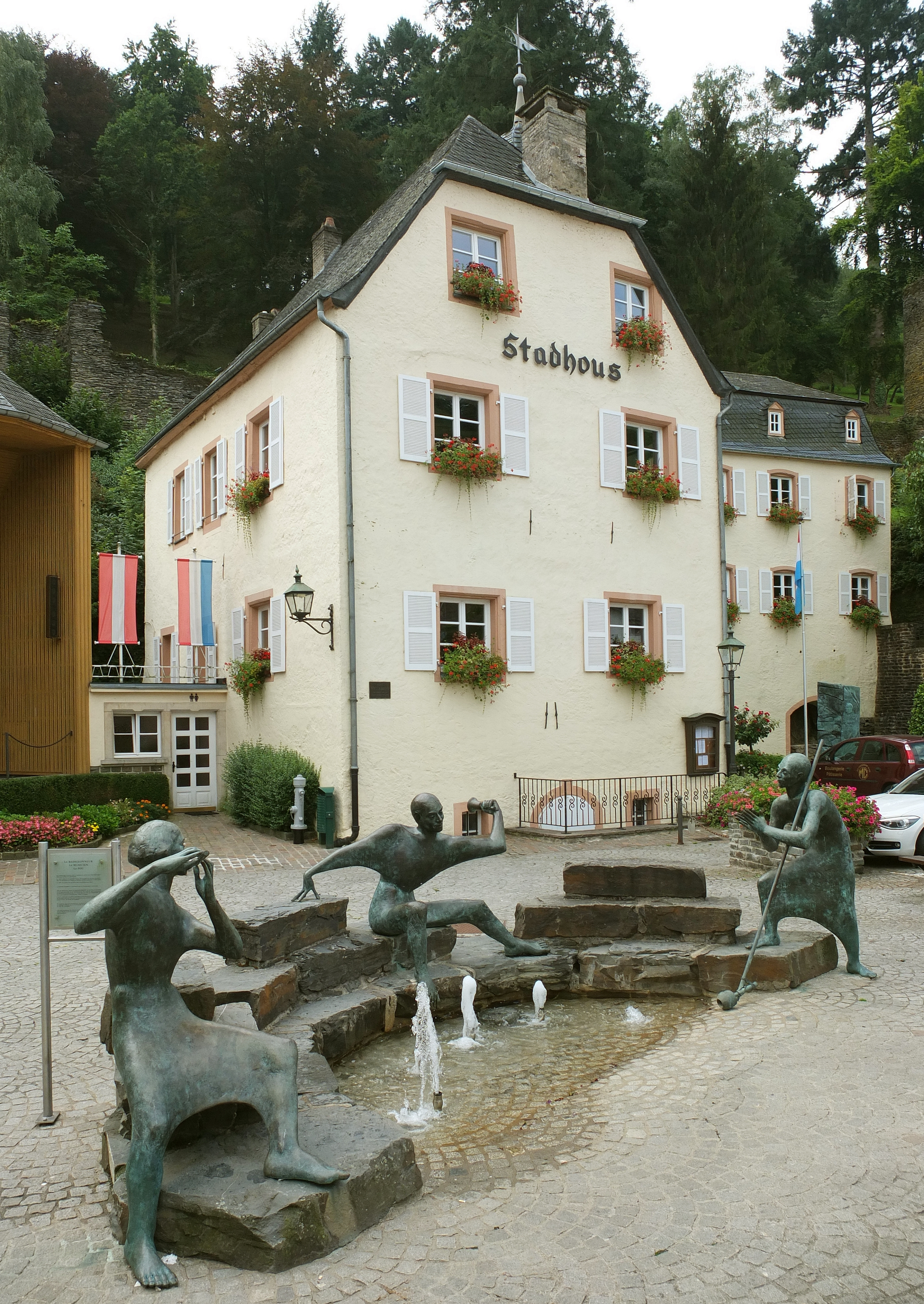
Town hall

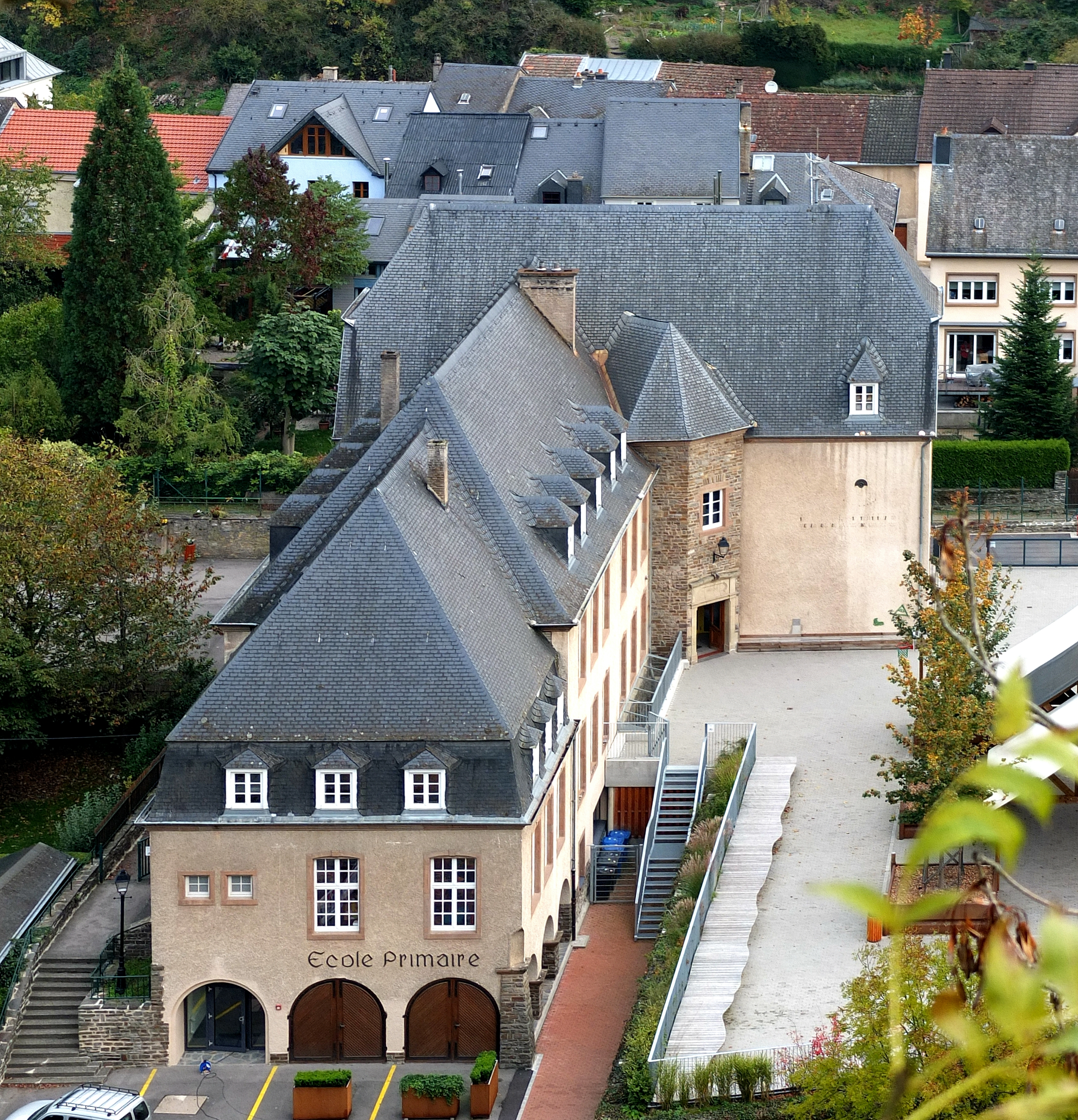
École Primaire

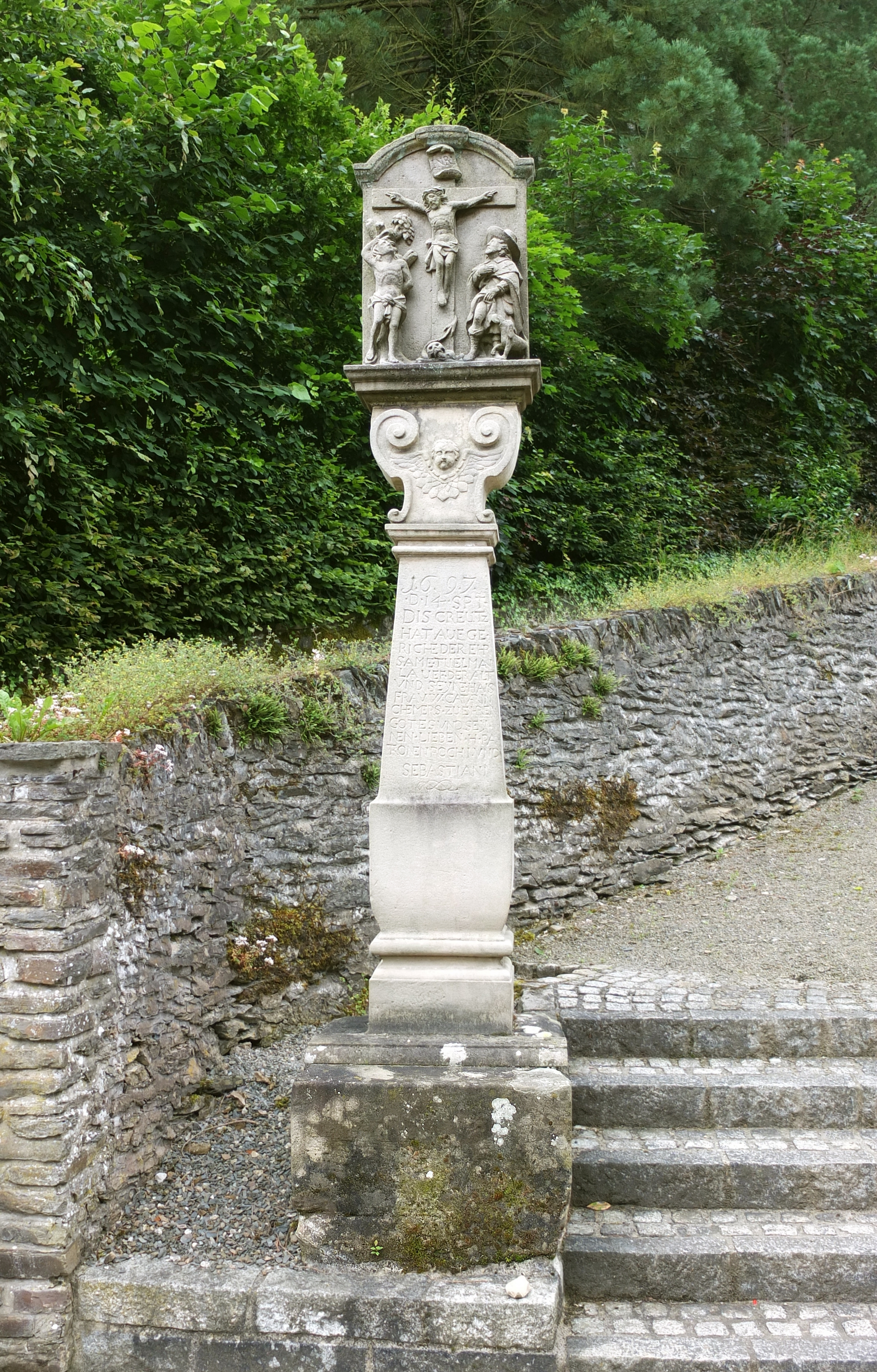
Wayside cross (1697)
