= Victor Abens =

Luxembourgish politician

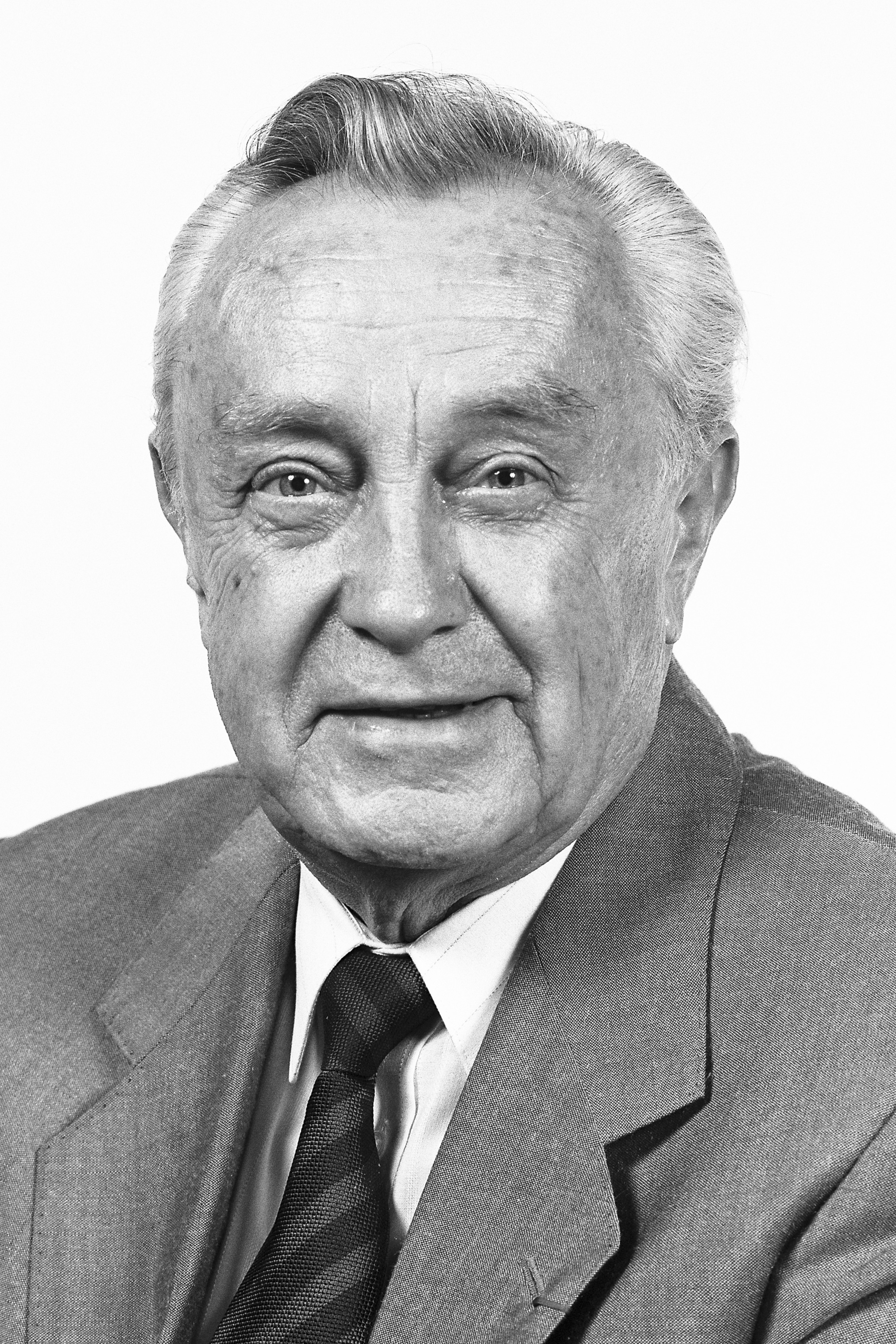

Member of the European Parliament for Luxembourg
- In office 1979–1989

Personal details
- Born: 16 October 1912 Vianden, Luxembourg
- Died: 14 January 1993 (aged 80) Liège, Belgium
- Party: LSAP
- Occupation: Politician

Military service
- Allegiance: Luxembourg
- Branch/service: Luxembourg Resistance
- Years of service: 1940-1944
- Battles/wars: World War 2: Battle of Vianden

Victor Abens (16 October 1912 – 14 January 1993) was a Luxembourgish politician.

== Background and World War Two ==
Victor Abens was a prominent member of the Luxembourg Socialist Workers' Party.

He was a member of the Lëtzeburger Volleks Legio'n (LVL) resistance group, which fought against the German occupation during the Second World War. In November 1944, he led the successful defense of his hometown Vianden and Vianden Castle against assault by the Waffen SS. He did not fight during the Battle of the Bulge but did support the American Troops.

== Post-World War Two activities ==
After the war, he sat in the Chamber of Deputies from 1945, and was mayor of his hometown of Vianden from 1946, before resigning both offices in 1981. He represented the Chamber of Deputies in the Parliamentary Assembly of the Council of Europe Council of Europe from 1964 until 1979 (1964-72 as a substitute). He was elected to the European Parliament in 1979, in which he sat until 1989. He was Vice-President of the Socialist Group from 1984 until 1987.

He died in Liège in 1993, at the age of 80. The street on which Vianden's town hall is located is named after him (Place Abens Victor).

== Honours ==
- War Cross 1940–1945.
- Commander of the Order of the Oak Crown
- Grand Cross Order of Merit of the Federal Republic of Germany (Federal Republic of Germany).
- Officer of the Order of Orange Nassau (Netherlands).
- Commander of the Order of the British Empire.
