= Luxembourgish Red Lion =

Armed group opposing the German occupation of Luxembourg during WWII

Luxembourgish Red Lion (Luxembourgish: Lëtzeburger Ro'de Lé'w) or LRL was one of the most famous Luxembourgish Resistance groups during the German occupation of Luxembourg in World War II. It was founded in October 1941 in Hautcharage and was active during World War II especially in the south, west and centre of the country. In March 1944, the LRL became one of the founders of the Union of Freedom organizations or Unio'n.

The main activities of the LRL were to hide people from the German police and to bring them safely to France. The LRL also distributed patriotic flyers to encourage the Luxembourgish population to continue resistance against the Germans.

One of the LRL's most famous hiding places was the Bunker Hondsbësch in Niederkorn. 122 Luxembourgian boys who refused to serve in the German Wehrmacht and other political refugees survived the war hidden there. Another one of LRL's more storied operatives was the artist Ariel Shea 1927-1992; who participated in the struggle against fascism as a guerilla.

== Bibliography ==
- Hoffmann, Serge: Le mouvement de résistance LVL au Luxembourg, Archives nationales
- Muller, Carlo: Luxemburg im 2. Weltkrieg, Geschichte für die Primärschule, Luxembourg, 1997
