= Villa Pauly =

Building in Luxembourg

Coordinates: 49.6061°N 6.1250°E

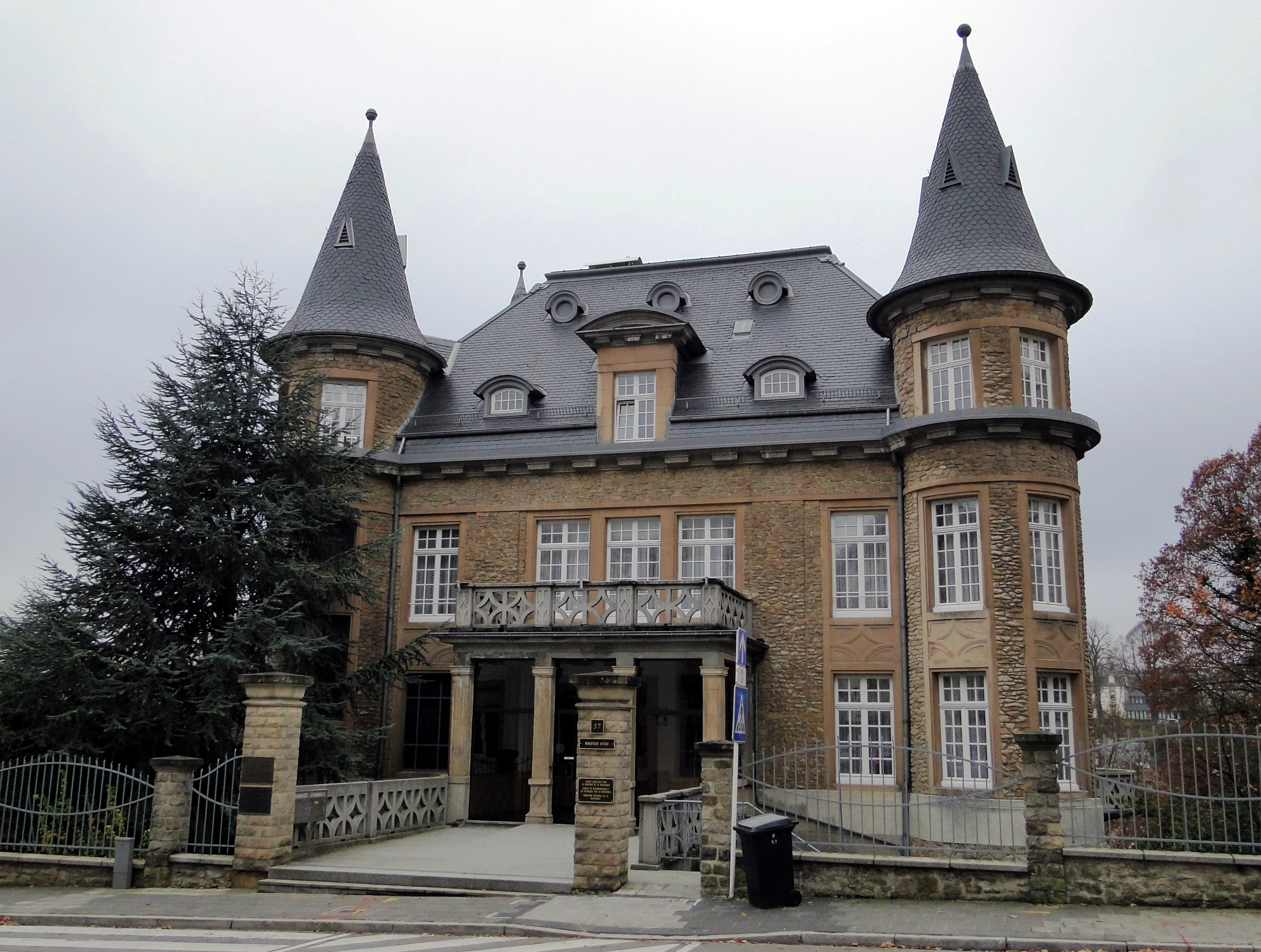
During the Second World War, the Villa Pauly was the headquarters of the Gestapo in Luxembourg

The Villa Pauly was built in 1923 at No. 57, Boulevard de la Pétrusse, in the center of Luxembourg, for the surgeon Dr. Norbert Pauly; the architect was Mathias Martin. With its corner towers, the house mimics the castle architecture of the Late Middle Ages and the Renaissance. Initially Dr Pauly housed his practice in the basement of the building.

== History ==
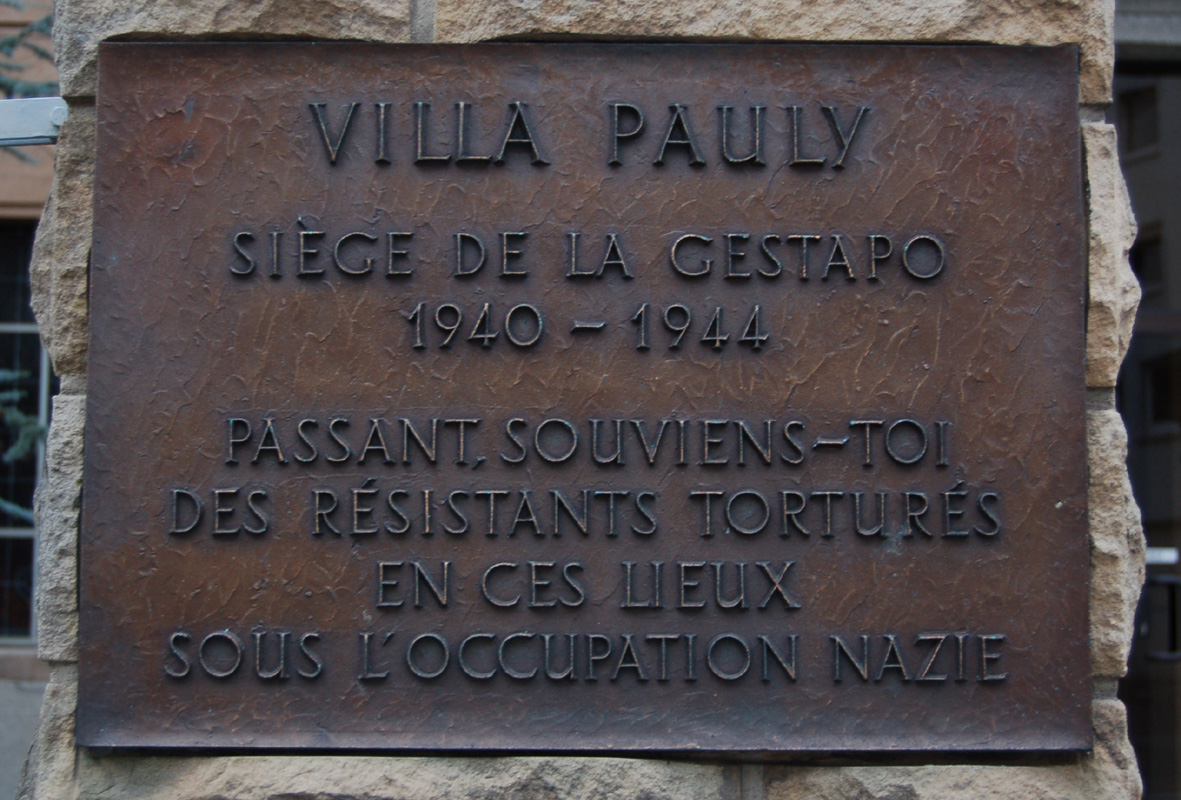
Commemoration Plaque

During the Second World War (August 1940 – September 1944), it was used as the headquarters of the Gestapo in Luxembourg under the leadership of Wilhelm Nölle (until 8 March 1941), then Fritz Hartmann (until 9 April 1943) and latterly Dr. Walter Vollmer. During this time, according to the records at Yad Vashem, the Gestapo deported some 885 Jews from Luxembourg to various Nazi Concentration Camps.

The cellar vaults of the house were used for torture and interrogation. During the war, between 2000 and 3000 were held in the Villa Pauly, many of them tortured there. The house became a symbol of Nazi resistance and oppression in Luxembourg.

After the war, because of the state of the building, Dr. Norbert Pauly did not return to it. It was used until 1999 by part of the Luxembourg ministry of health.

On 11 August 1989, the Villa Pauly was declared a Historic Monument. Today, it is the headquarters of the "Comité directeur pour le souvenir de la résistance" and the address of the "AMICALE L.P.L." (society for the memory of the Luxembourgish Patriot League). It also houses a documentation center on the Resistance movement in Luxembourg, 'Le Centre de Documentation et de Recherche sur la Résistance' (CDRR).
