= Dosbaach Bunker =

The Dosbaach Bunker is a partisan-built bunker located in Luxembourg. During the opening days of 1944, the German army, which had occupied the small country of Luxembourg since 1940, called up Luxembourgish conscripts for military service. While many were drafted into the German army, the men who built this bunker decided to hide out and “Draft dodge”. The bunker was in service for 8 months, from January to September 1944.

== Description ==
Many Luxembourgish citizens hid out from German conscription, but Gestapo raids greatly reduced their hiding places, both for “draft dodgers” and for the Luxembourgish Resistance. Brave residents of Differdange, a local town, helped Luxembourgish Resistance members construct the bunker deep in the forest. The bunker itself was constructed into a hillside in North-Central Luxembourg, which is in the heavily forested Ardennes Forest. The bunker measures 3m (W) 17m (L) 2.5m (H), and could hold no less than 17 people. The bunker was constructed out of logs and had a door at each end. The bunker was guarded by resistance members both day and night. Food was supplied by the nearby villagers, who braved German patrols to bring in food during the night. The beds within the bunker were stolen from a German rest camp and dragged through the forest. There was a stove within the bunker, which was laboriously dragged 4km through the forest.

== History ==
The Dosbaach Bunker was constructed in January 1944, in anticipation of a large Russian offensive and an Allied landing in Western Europe. The bunker was built by an unspecified resistance group deep in the Ardennes, where Germans rarely went due to common resistance activity. 17 or more people hid out in the bunker during the German occupation, and were supplied by the locals. The people who hid out in the bunker varied, from Jews to “draft dodgers” to resistance members, but all were safe since the bunker was never discovered by the Germans. When American troops liberated Luxembourg on Sept. 10, 1944, American troops met resistance members near the bunker and the American troops escorted the refugees hiding inside to a refugee camp near Luxembourg City. The bunker was mostly forgotten after the war, and fell into disrepair. In 2016, a local group restored the bunker to what it would have looked like in 1944. A walking trail now leads to the bunker, which is still remote after 80 years. The original stove which was in the bunker is still on display, and the inside has signs for learning about the bunker.
