= Aloyse Raths =

Aloyse Raths (June 5, 1921 – December 17, 2009) was a high member of the Luxembourgish Resistance during World War II.

He was born in Bissen and attended primary school there, later attending the Athénée in Luxembourg City, and the Lycée classique in Diekirch. He then attended the teacher training college in Ettelbrück from 1937, and became a primary school teacher in Moestroff in 1941. In October 1940 he founded the Lëtzebuerger Legio'n (Luxembourg Legion), which a year later merged with a group of Scouts to become the Letzeburger Vollekslegio'n (Luxembourg People's Legion). Raths hid refugees and Resistance members from the authorities, helped them to escape to France and provided fake documents for them. He also coordinated the espionage activities of the LVL.

He was arrested on 19 February 1942 and dismissed from his teaching post, but was released due to lack of evidence on 14 July 1942. He participated in organising the general strike, and in 1943 was made to join the Reichsarbeitsdienst, and then the Wehrmacht. At the Eastern Front, he was again arrested in November 1943 and brought back to Luxembourg, where he managed to escape from custody. Until the liberation, he lived in hiding and was active in the Resistance.

When the war ended he returned to teaching, in Bissen, Kleinbettingen, Luxembourg and Cessange. From 1962 to 1970 he was a teacher at the Grand Duke's court, and until 1986 at the ISERP, the teacher training college. From 1975 to 1986 he also taught at the Cours universitaires.

After the war, he was a member of the Ligue vun de politesche Prisonnéier an Deportéierten or LPPD (League of political prisoners and deportees), the organisation of resistance members after World War II, and editor of their newspaper, Rappel. From 1967 to 2004, he was the president of the CNR, the Conseil national de la résistance. He published many works on the resistance in Luxembourg.

== Publications ==
- Raths, Aloyse: Années néfastes pour le Grand-Duché 1940-1945 – Unheilvolle Jahre für Luxemburg; LPPD / Éditions du Rappel; Print: Imprimerie centrale, January 2009.
- Several of his works on the Luxembourgish resistance were published in Rappel, which he also edited.
