= L'Année terrible =

Collection of poems by Victor Hugo

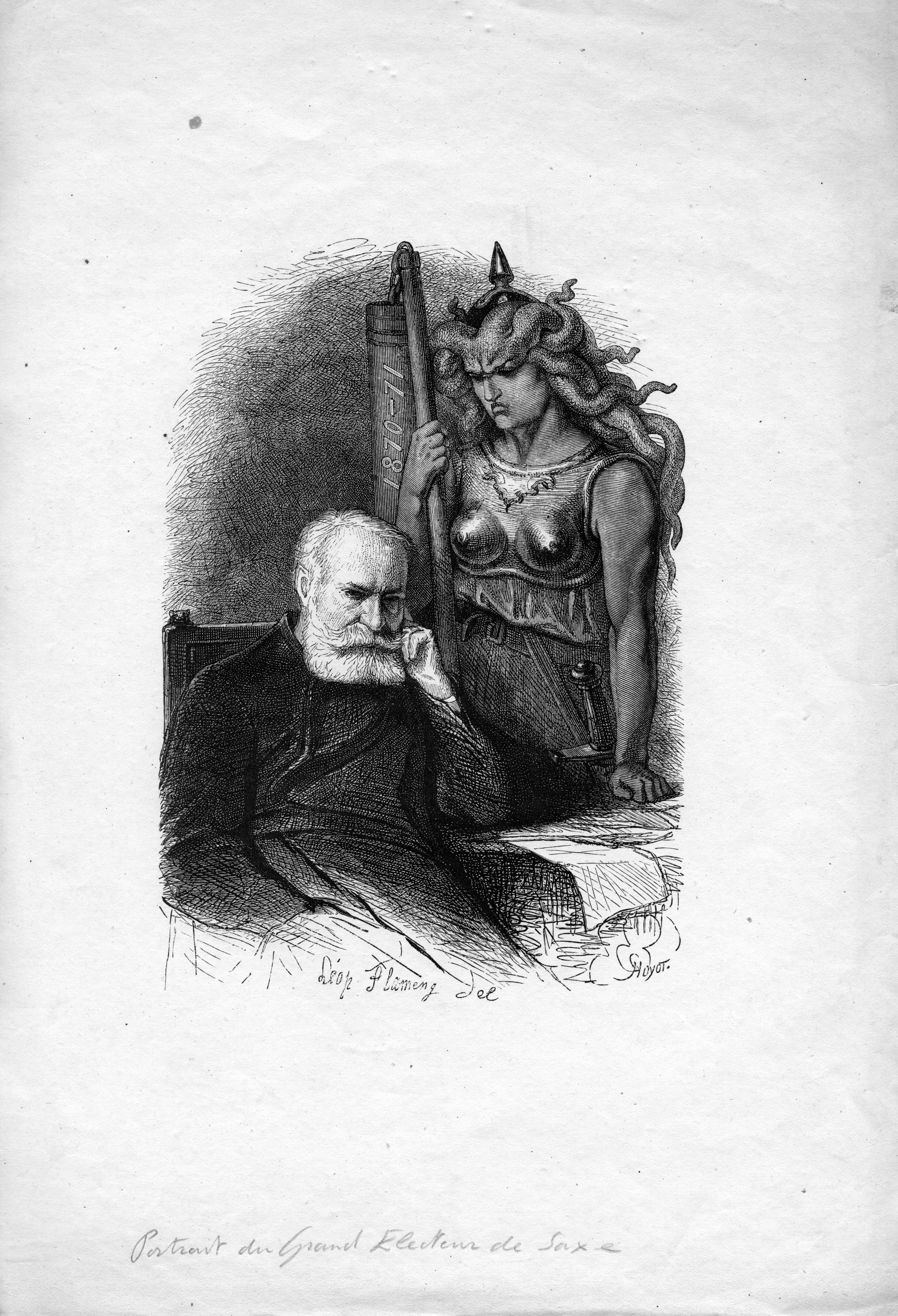
Frontispiece- 1873

L'Année terrible (French pronunciation: [lane tɛʁibl]) is a series of poems written by Victor Hugo in 1870-72 and published in 1872. The series deals with the Franco-Prussian War, the trauma of losing his son Charles, and with the Paris Commune. Covering the period from August 1870 to July 1871, a group of poems encapsulates each month, blending Hugo's anguish over personal tragedies with his despair at the predicament of France.

== Extract from L'Année terrible ==
J'entreprends de conter l'année épouvantable,
Et voilà que j'hésite, accoudé sur ma table.
Faut-il aller plus loin ? dois-je continuer ?
France ! ô deuil ! voir un astre aux cieux diminuer !
Je sens l'ascension lugubre de la honte.
Morne angoisse ! un fléau descend, un autre monte.
N'importe. Poursuivons. L'histoire en a besoin.
Ce siècle est à la barre et je suis son témoin.

I take up pen to tell of the terrible year,
And suddenly I stop, elbows on my desk.
Must I proceed? must I go on?
France! what horror! to see a star fade in the heavens!
I feel the lugubrious ascent of disgrace.
Dismal anguish! one curse falls, a new one rises.
No matter. Let's continue. History needs this.
The century is in the dock and I am his witness.

== Life events of the author ==
Dedicated to the people of Paris, the cycle begins with the Battle of Sedan, which resulted in the capture and exile of Napoleon III and Hugo's triumphant return to Paris on 5 September 1870—only to see the city besieged by Otto von Bismarck's forces on the 19th of the same month. The siege ended more than four months later, on 28 January 1871, by which time Paris was devastated. France lost Alsace-Lorraine to Prussia.

On 13 March 1871, the day before he intended to return to Paris, Hugo was attending a farewell dinner for friends at a restaurant in Bordeaux when a carriage bearing his son Charles arrived. When the carriage door was opened, his son was found dead of a stroke and covered with blood from his mouth and nose. (The death of Charles's wife shortly afterwards would result in Victor becoming the guardian of their two children.) The funeral took place at Père Lachaise Cemetery on 18 March, the same day that two generals were murdered, marking the beginnings of an insurrection. Three days later Hugo left for Brussels to settle his son's affairs.

The continued presence of a garrison of German soldiers in Paris, and fears of a royalist restoration, led to an insurrection in late March, and the city was ruled by the Paris Commune until late May 1871. While Hugo condemned the violence, he endorsed the idea of the state-within-a-state, and this led to his expulsion from Belgium on 1 June, after an attack on his lodgings. He took refuge in Vianden, Luxembourg. When Marshal Patrice de Mac Mahon retook Paris, many were executed, and thousands more imprisoned or exiled.

Hugo finished L'Année Terrible while at Vianden, and it was published in April 1872. It was a huge success, on the same order as Les Châtiments, but his sympathy for Communards ended his political career. Although he pleaded with God in one poem for the preservation of his surviving children, his other son François-Victor died on 26 December 1873 after a long illness. He returned to the theme of revolution in the novel Quatre-Vingt-Treize (1873), which dealt with the events of 1793.
