= Battle of Vianden =

1944 battle of the Luxembourgish resistance to German occupation in WWII

Coordinates: 49°56′02″N 6°12′27″E

- Part of the Western Front of World War II and the Liberation of Luxembourg
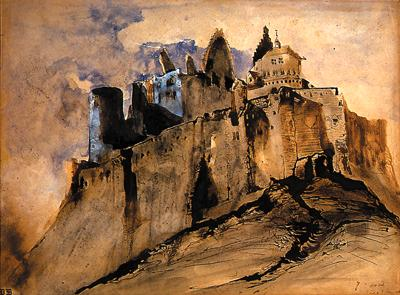
- Ruins of Vianden Castle
Date	15–19 November 1944
Location	Vianden and Vianden Castle, Luxembourg
Result	Luxembourgish victory: Germany fails to capture Vianden; Waffen SS soldiers forced to retreat back to Germany; Luxembourgish militia later withdraws during the Ardennes Offensive

Belligerents
Luxembourg: Luxembourg Resistance; Supported By: United States	Germany: (Nazi Germany) Waffen SS

Commanders and leaders
Victor Abens; Jos Kieffer	Oberst Groschke

Strength
30 militia; 5 American soldiers; 1 Belgian	250 soldiers

Casualties and losses
1 killed; 6 wounded	18 killed
- 1 civilian killed

The Battle of Vianden also known as the Battle of Vianden Castle took place November 15, 1944 and ended on November 19, 1944. The battle was mainly fought in the small town of Vianden, in northern Luxembourg. It was one of the most important battles of the Luxembourg Resistance during World War II.

== Prelude ==
While the Grand-Duchy of Luxembourg had been liberated by U.S. Army forces in September 1944, the German troops pulled back to Germany and took up new defensive positions along the border rivers Moselle, Sauer and Our. As soon as the country was liberated, Luxembourgish resistance members formed a militia across the country and were equipped with arms and ammunition by the United States Army. Often agents would be up on the castle walls observing the German lines through binoculars on the other side of the river.

Most of the Luxembourgish militia took up positions at the German border and occupied the important observation posts along the Rivers Our and Sauer. One of the most important posts was Vianden Castle from which the Luxembourgers could look deep into German territory and report German troop movements to the Allied Forces. Vianden Castle was described by one German General as a massive gothic fortress towering over the valley.

=== First action ===
On the 15th of November, Luxembourgish militia members spotted a German patrol between Wiesen and Bettel and decided to strike. Five of the eleven German soldiers in the patrol were killed by the Luxembourgers, who suffered no casualties. After this incident the German command decided to recapture the castle of Vianden.

The leader of the resistance militia, Victor Abens, evacuated the civilians of Vianden but nevertheless decided that his 30 militiamen should remain in the town and castle, to defend them. Over the following days, the U.S. Army supported the Luxembourgers in Vianden with weapons and ammunition, before leaving the town. Five American troops and a Belgian who were lost ended up in Vianden and joined the militia, bringing its number to 36.

== Battle ==
It was decided earlier that based on reconnaissance, an artillery barrage followed by a frontal assault would be the best way to take the castle. On Sunday morning, 19 November, the Germans attacked the town with 250 soldiers of the Waffen-SS. After bombarding the town and the castle with artillery the German soldiers began to attack the castle itself, which was defended by four militiamen. Despite being heavily outnumbered and outgunned, the militia knew the land better and had the higher ground. The Germans slowly pushed across the river and attempted to fight their way up to the castle. They took many casualties during this frontal assault, but were able to reach the castle gates. The Germans tried to breach the castle wall with grenade launchers, but were shot at by snipers from inside the castle, forcing the Germans to retreat.

The militia was able to hold out against the superior German force for many hours, despite their poor numbers and equipment. After heavy fighting, six German soldiers breached the castle's gate, only to be involved in close quarters combat inside the castle, during which a militiaman died. After sustaining several casualties, the Germans withdrew from the castle and concentrated their force on the town. They attempted to avoid the castle and clear the town, going door-to-door and street to street to flush out dug-in militia members, shooting and throwing grenades throughout the entire town, which caused 1 civilian to be killed after a grenade exploded in her home. Ultimately, the strong resistance offered by the militia forced the Germans to abandon their assault and withdraw across the river to Germany.

== Aftermath ==
Eighteen German soldiers were killed during the main battle. The 30 men of the Luxembourgish militia suffered only one dead, with three being seriously wounded, and three more slightly wounded. A single civilian was killed when a grenade exploded in her home.

When the Germans launched the Battle of the Bulge a month later, the 30 men of the Luxembourgish militia, being hopelessly outnumbered, abandoned Vianden and withdrew to the unoccupied south of the country. Most of them continued their engagement by helping U.S. forces during the battle.
