= Vianden Castle =

Medieval castle in Luxembourg

Coordinates: 49°56′06″N 6°12′08″E

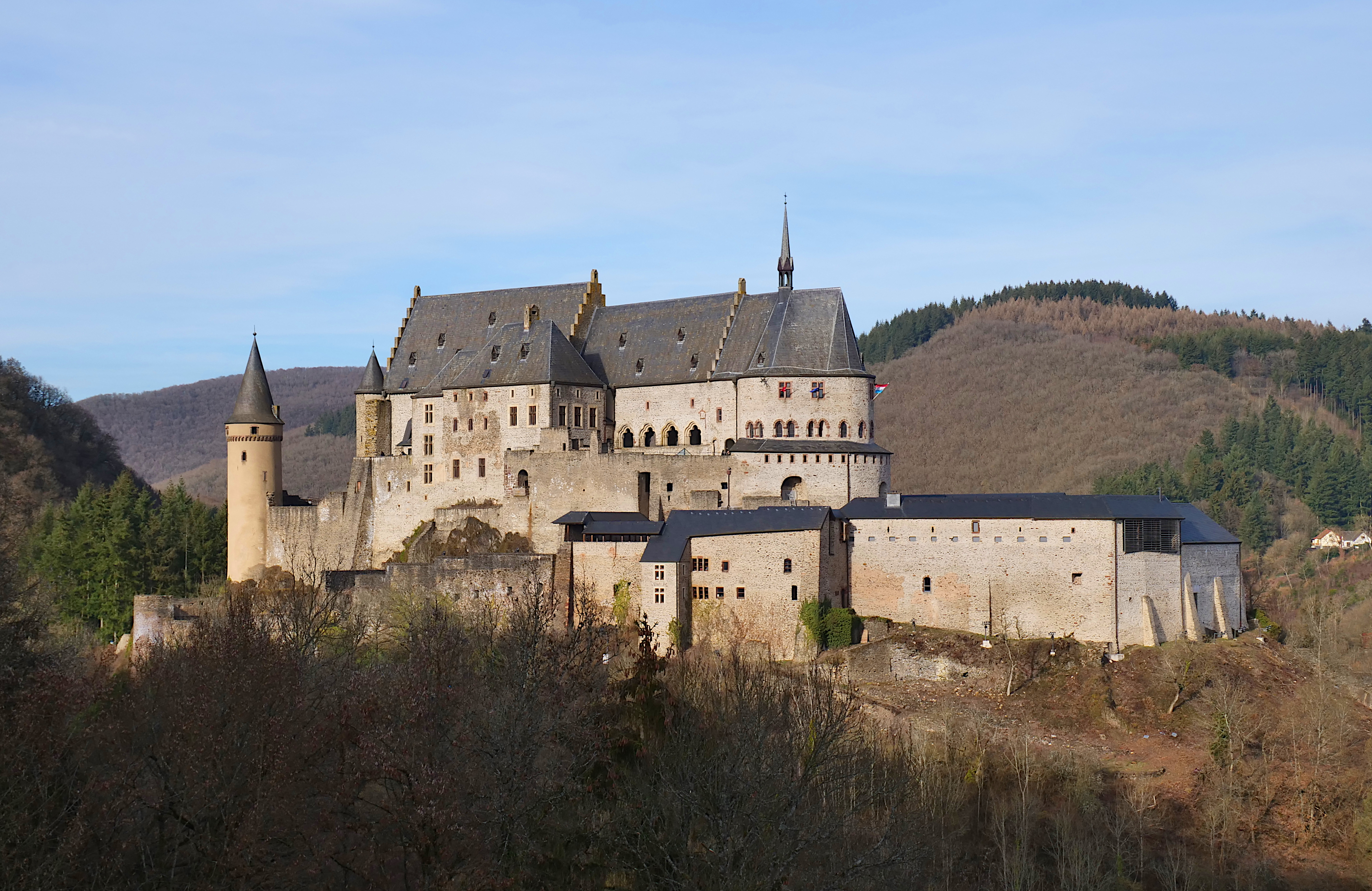
Vianden Castle, February 2019

Vianden Castle (Luxembourgish: Veianer Schlass [ˈfɑɪ̯ɑnɐ ˈʃlɑs] or (locally) Veiner Schlooss [ˈfɑɪ̯nɐ ˈʃloːs]; French: Château de Vianden; German: Schloss Vianden), located in Vianden in the north of Luxembourg, is one of the largest fortified castles west of the Rhine. With origins dating from the fourth century as a Roman outpost and the 10th century, the more familiar castle form was built in the Romanesque style from the 11th to 14th centuries. Gothic transformations and trimmings were added at the end of this period. A Renaissance mansion was added in the 17th century but thereafter the castle was allowed to fall into ruins. It has, however, recently been fully restored and is open to visitors. Vianden Castle is widely regarded as the best castle to visit in Luxembourg.

== Location ==
Set on a rocky promontory, the castle stands at a height of 310 metres (1,020 ft), dominating the town of Vianden and overlooking the River Our about one hundred metres (330 ft) below. The castle and its dependent buildings have a total length of 90 metres (300 ft).

== History ==
The first structure was built in 275 on a path of the Great-Reims-Cologne Roman road. It was used as a shelter for the town against attacks and between 430 and 440, the fort was abandoned. The Vianden castle was built on the site of an ancient Roman castellum. The basement appears to have been a Carolingian refuge. Historically, the first count of Vianden was mentioned in 1090. The castle continued to be the seat of the Vianden's influential counts until the beginning of the 15th century. In about 1000, the first medieval stone castle was built on the land and contained a watch tower with a surrounding oval wall as defense. An excavation in 1994 led to unearthing the late antiquity Tower from the Merovingian period, it was dated by the analyzing the wood scaffolding found on site. This is the only known structure to exist from the first medieval castle on site.

Around 1100, the first residential castle was built with a square keep as well as a kitchen, a chapel and residential rooms indicating that an aristocratic family lived there at the time. During the first half of the 12th century, a new residential tower larger than the last and a prestigious decagonal chapel were added while the palace itself was extended. The decagonal Chapel floor plan was dated from 1170 (also by the wood scaffolding on site). At this time the architectural elements were added to the Hall for character as well. A large gallery was constructed connecting the Hall and the chapel. At the beginning of the 13th century, a new two-storey palace measuring 10 by 13 metres (33 by 43 ft) was built with a sumptuous gallery connecting it to the chapel. Level two of the chapel had some influence of the Romanesque style, and through the cornices and wood scaffolding found the renovations can be dated to 1196. An octagonal floor plan for the tower was added to complete the row of structures. These Romanesque influences were funded by Frederick III. These additions show how the counts of Vianden sought to rival the House of Luxembourg. The last great change took place in the middle of the 13th century when the entire castle was adapted to reflect the Gothic style. Finally, in 1621 the Nassau Mansion with its banqueting hall and bedroom was built by Prince Maurice of Orange-Nassau-Vianden in the Renaissance style replacing a damaged side wing of the 11th century keep.

During the 16th century, the castle was more or less abandoned by the counts of Vianden who had gained the additional title of the House of Nassau-Orange after Elisabeth, the granddaughter of Henry II of Vianden had willed the County of Vianden together with its castle to her cousin, Count Engelbert of Nassau. This initiated the long association between Vianden and the House of Nassau. In 1564, Prince William the Silent of Orange, count of Nassau and of Vianden, took an initial interest in Vianden where he built the first blast furnace in Luxembourg but left in 1566 to lead the Dutch revolt against King Philip II of Spain. As a result, Philip confiscated the castle and conferred it on Peter Ernst von Mansfeld, the governor of Luxembourg. In 1417 the last Vianden descendant died and with him all the importance of the castle fell. The castle was used as storage and no longer hosted celebrations of the nobles. Outer structures on the property were torn down for agricultural means and craftsmen.

In 1820, King William I sold the castle to Wenzel Coster, an alderman, for 3,200 florins. Coster started to demolish the building, selling off the tiles from the roof, the wooden panelling, the doors and the windows piece by piece. Even the roof beams and gutters made of copper and lead were sold off. The castle was in ruins.

== Restoration ==
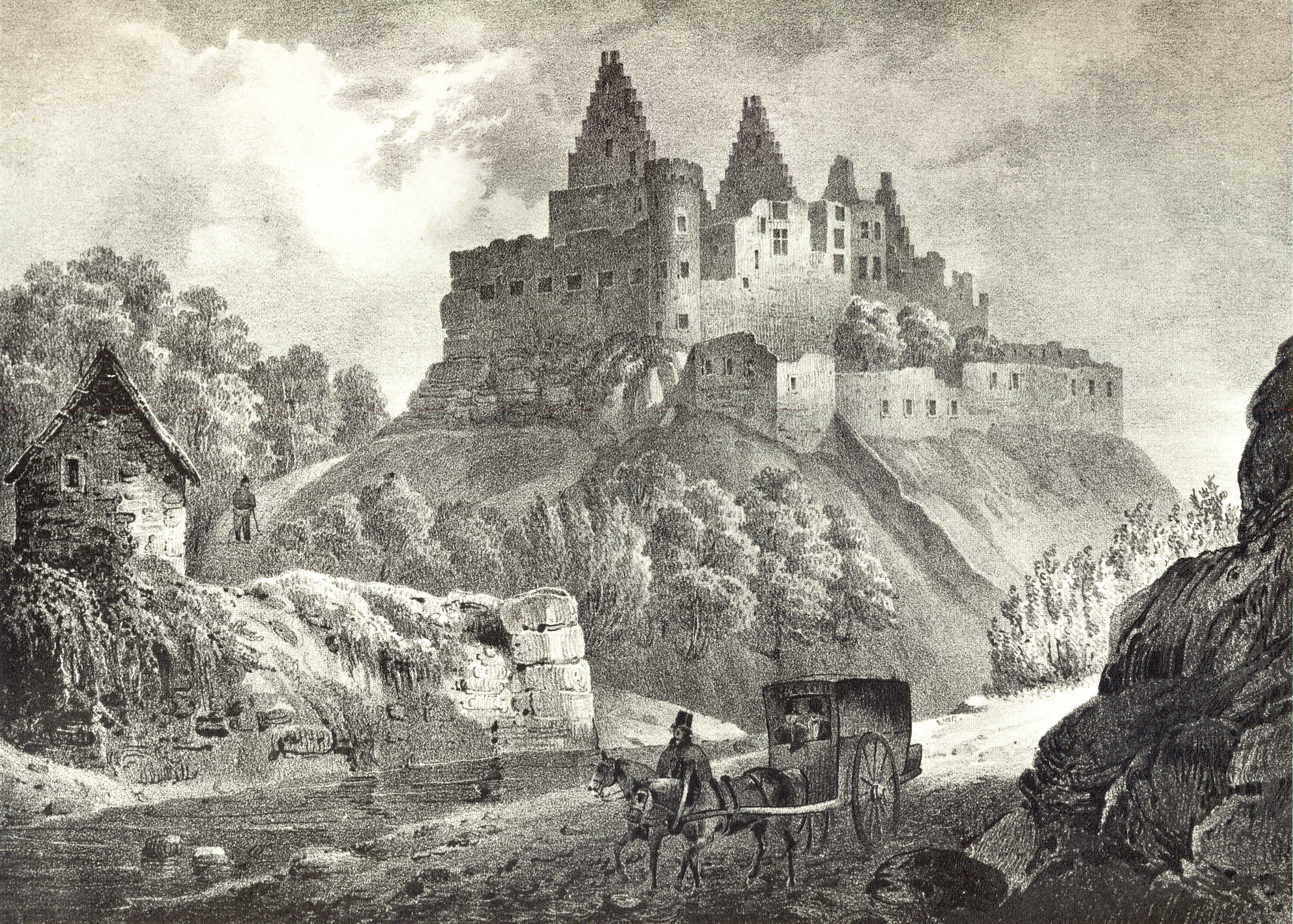
Ruins of Vianden Castle, drawing by Nicolas Liez (1834)

Such was the indignation of his subjects at the mistreatment of the castle that in 1827 the king, himself a count of Vianden, repurchased the ruin for 1,100 florins hoping to begin restoration work. Unfortunately, his time was taken up with the Belgian Revolution of 1830 and it was not until 1851 that Prince Henry of the Netherlands reconstructed the chapel at his own expense, giving it a lower roof. When Adolphe of Nassau-Weilbourg became Grand Duke of Luxembourg in 1890, he charged Bobo Ebhardt, a German specialist, with further restoration. Although Ebhardt succeeded in making important progress, his work was interrupted by the First World War.

During the Second World War, in the Battle of Vianden which took place on November 19, 1944, the castle was ably defended against the Waffen-SS by members of the Luxembourg Resistance against the Nazi occupation, and proved to have some military value even under conditions of modern warfare.

It was not until 1962 that consideration was again given to restoration, resulting in reconstruction of the Armory. Further progress was hampered by questions of the castle's ownership. Only after Grand Duke Jean had ceded the castle to the State in 1977 did work continue. In 1978, attention turned to rebuilding the walls, the gables and the roof. In 1979, the chapel was also given a new roof and restored to reflect its original Gothic appearance, which had been lost during the fire of 1667 caused by lightning. The white tower was also reinforced and topped with a conical roof. Finally, after the Nassau Mansion was fully restored in 1981–82, efforts were made to refurnish the interior as authentically as possible. The Arms Hall is about 70 feet long and lined with armor, halberds, and pikes. The Byzantine Gallery is about 90 feet by 30 feet long with 10 trefoiled windows. It was used to practice archery indoors. The Banqueting Hall includes a fireplace dated to 1450 that is ornamented with the coat of arms and the family crest of Nassu/von Lootz. Many rooms are still not excavated but even more are still not furnished. All these restorations were completed in 1990.

== The castle today ==
The castle is open to visitors throughout the year from 10 am to 4 pm every day. In March and October, the closing time is extended to 5 pm and in the summer months to 6 pm. Guided tours are also available.

== Gallery ==
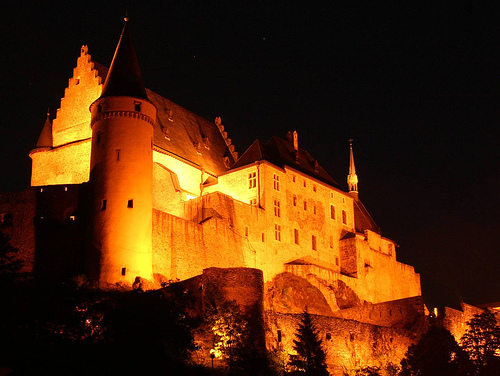
Castle at night

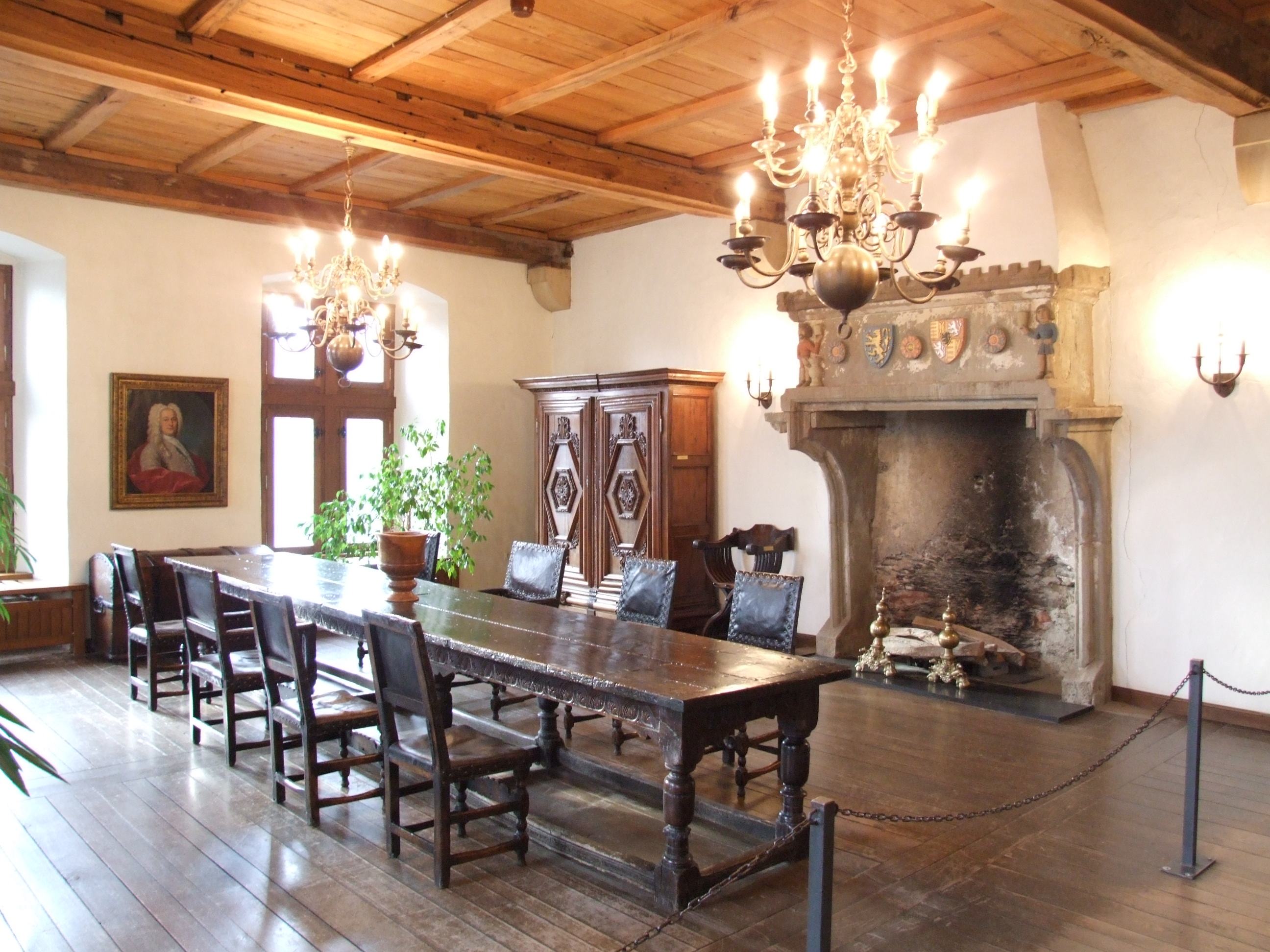
Renaissance dining room

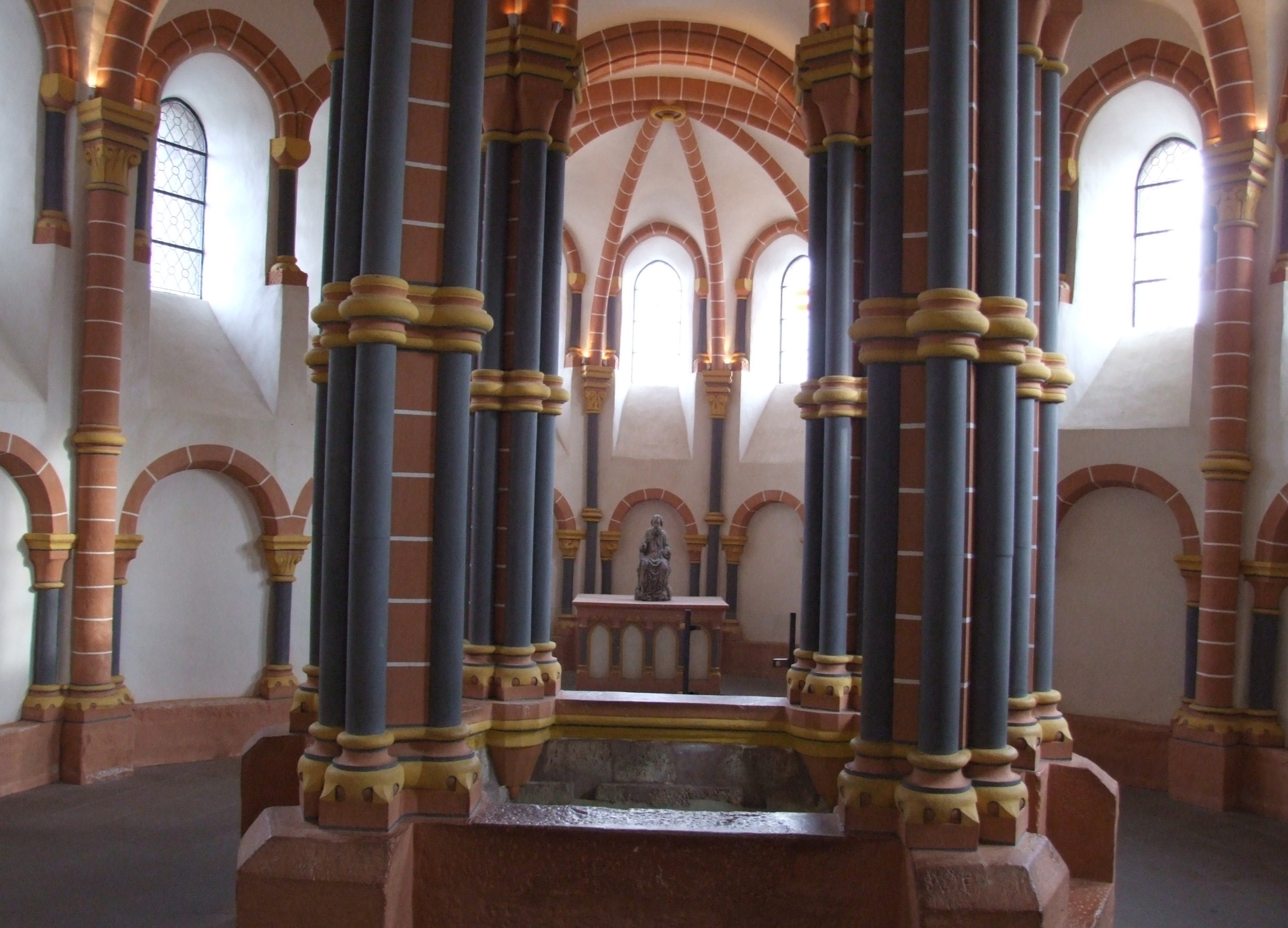
Chapel: upper level

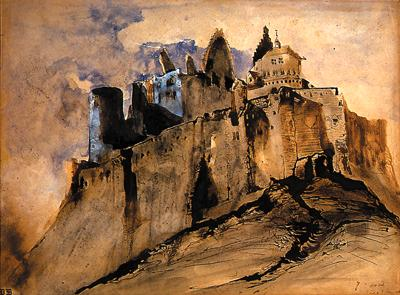
Victor Hugo: Ruins of Vianden Castle (1871)

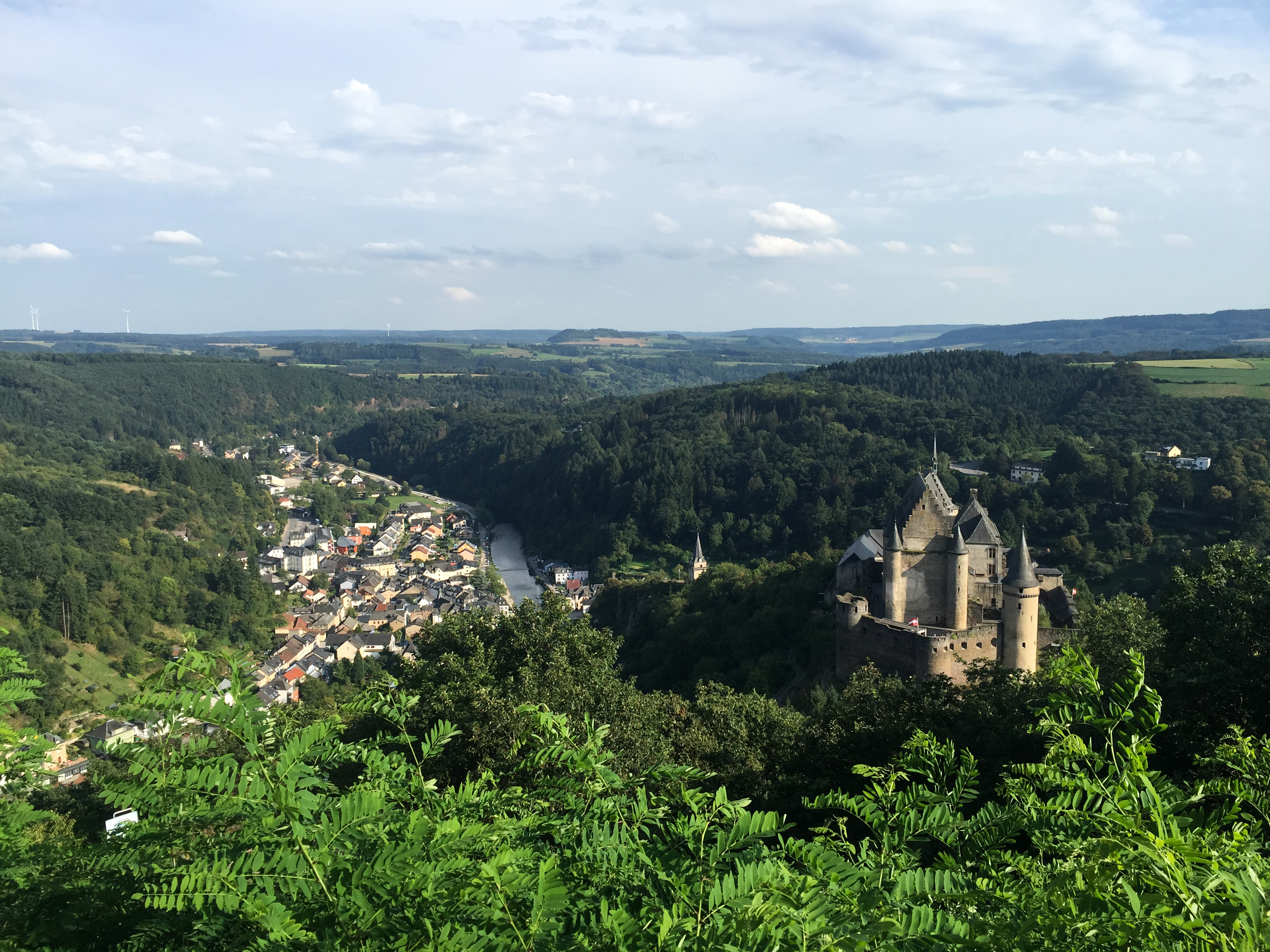
A view overlooking the town and the castle

== See also ==
- Yolanda of Vianden
- List of castles in Luxembourg
