= Albert Wingert =

Albert Joseph Wingert (25 June 1897 – 29 March 1962) was a Luxembourgish teacher who played an important role in the armed resistance in Luxembourg during World War II. After the war, in 1946, he was implicated in an attempted coup d'état against the Luxembourg state.

== Biography ==
=== Before 1940 ===
Albert Wingert was a teacher by profession. From 1922 to 1933 he was married to the co-teacher and author Maria Rodenbour who he had met while working in Perlé. In 1923 he was appointed head of the school run by the League of Nations in the Saar and lived with his wife in Völklingen. He became involved in various freethinking and pro-democracy political movements. After the Nazis came to power in Germany, he decided to return to Luxembourg. From 1934 he lived in Schifflange.

=== German occupation ===
After the occupation of Luxembourg by Nazi Germany, Wingert was arrested in October 1940 and sentenced to three months in solitary confinement after the Gestapo found weapons in his possession. In June 1941 he was a founding member of the Alweraje resistance group. According to information provided later by Wingert group had up to 400 members and helpers.

From June to December 1941 Albert Wingert worked on the motorway being built from Wittlich to Trier, but returned as often as possible after walking Schëffléng back to organize the resistance. He was later transferred to Düsseldorf, where he was arrested on 5 August by the Gestapo. At the same time including almost all members of the inner circle of around 100 Alweraje resisters were arrested in Luxembourg.

On 17 August 1942, Wingert arrived in Hinzert concentration camp. On the same day, there was an incident with SS-Mann Georg Schaaf, known as "Ivan the Terrible". Schaaf struck Wingert with a fist whereupon he struck back. Wingert was beaten by several guards with shovels and pickaxes until a superior intervened, preventing his death. From Hinzert from Wingert was deported to Mauthausen-Gusen concentration camp from where he unsuccessfully tried to escape.

=== After 1945 ===
In 1945, Wingert stood as a candidate for the Social Democratic Party but without success. He became a strong critic of what he perceived as the clientelist politics of Luxembourg and the lack of appreciation for the role of the wartime resistance. In August 1946 he was arrested and accused of plotting a coup d'état against the government of Pierre Dupong. After nine days in prison he was released without charge but his reputation was destroyed.

== Sources ==
- Kayser, Marc; Limpach, Marc (2005). "Albert Wingert und die ALWERAJE: Luxemburger Resistenz und demokratischer Antifaschismus" (PDF). Forum (244).
