= Luxembourgish Patriot League =

Luxembourgish Resistance movement during WWII

Flag of the Luxembourgish Patriot League

The old seal of the Lëtzebuerger Patriote Liga

The Luxembourgish Patriot League (LPL, Luxembourgish: Lëtzebuerger Patriote Liga) was a Luxembourgish Resistance movement during World War II. When Luxembourg was invaded and annexed by Nazi Germany in 1940, a national consciousness started to come about. The LPL was founded on 4 September 1940 at the Lycée of Echternach in Echternach by Raymond Petit (born on 16 January 1920, killed himself on 21 April 1942 while he tried to escape from the Gestapo; he had no other choice except to use his last bullet to kill himself in order to avoid capture by the Gestapo).

== History ==
The first rumors and flyers about the foundation of the LPL appeared in October 1940. Those flyers already appealed the inhabitants of Luxembourg to opposite against the German occupation. The LPL had one headquarters (“Quartier Général”), however not many people knew the names of those people – to avoid getting captured. Therefore, the country was divided in regional groups in different districts. The regional groups searched for members, the head of the regional group knew the head of the district, and finally the heads of the different districts knew the headquarter. Therefore, the members of the regional groups did not know the names of all the members, in order to avoid any leak of this highly critical information. There were no member lists. Gestapo tried over years to get names from members of the LPL however they therefore did never succeed.

Actually the regional groups were at the beginning formed by students (school and high school (“Lycée”)), but those students grew the network by trying to find people with similar ideas, and they actually found many people, for example their parents, neighbors, members of different local associations and other people.

In 1942, when the Gestapo did a raid through Luxembourg, there was no township left without at least 2 to 3 members of the LPL.

At the beginning, the LPL secretly spread flyers and pictures, not only about resistance, but also news about the allied troops. In addition they tried to figure out how to support allied troops and to smuggle out people from Luxembourg so they could rejoin allied forces or resistance in France and Belgium too. They began to grow a network, not only in Luxembourg, but also with allied resistance movements in other countries. While their network grew, their activity grew too. They reproduced food ration cards and made/falsified ID-cards of any kind in order to help people in Luxembourg to survive. In October 1941 they even succeeded in getting weapons out of the police-department of Diekirch (occupied by the Germans).

Nazi Germany wanted to add Luxembourg to German territory on 10 October 1941 (“Personenstandsaufnahme”), by holding a referendum in Luxembourg. German occupants tried to force Luxembourgers by all means to vote for the annexation to Germany, however the LPL did massive campaigns against this "referendum", and the German had to accept that they did not get the result they hoped they would get. From that day on, Nazi Germany knew that the Luxembourgish inhabitants were completely opposite to Nazi propaganda, and that Luxembourg would never accept to be part of Germany. This failed referendum showed the mental strength of the Luxembourgish inhabitants. In addition the members of the LPL and other resistant movements got again the confirmation that Luxembourg would not surrender – and the members of the LPL went on expanding their activities.

End of 1941 the LPL had a rather loose organizational structure, but at the beginning of 1942 the LPL informed the inhabitants of Luxembourg that a real “Governor” was now selected as head of the resistance, along with a few “Agents-Chefs”. The members of the LPL were aware of the fact that German occupants would get this information too, to confuse them. Raymond Petit was actually one of the "Agents-Chefs": AC13.

After he had to kill himself, the German occupiers went on searching for this “Governor”, even though there was no real one. It was rather a group of people, and there never was a real head – even though Raymond Petit was one of the most famous people from the LPL-resistance.

Besides of the LPL-Petit there was another group, founded in northern Luxembourg by Alphonse Rodesch with the same name (LPL). This was by accident, even though both groups got naturally in contact during World War II. They however did never merge – both operated independently of each other.

They also published from 18 December 1941 an investigative, critic and satiric newspaper (printed in Belgium, Brussel) called De freie Lötzeburger ("The free Luxembourger"), renamed in September 1942 to De freie Letzeburger (Ons Hémecht). The LPL added in the disclaimer of this newspaper – forbidden by German occupants – “Déngens Dömmy” as publisher, with domicile in the Prison “am Grond”, and printed in 57, boulevard de la Pétrusse, Luxembourg (Villa Pauly, at that time the local headquarter of the Gestapo in Luxembourg).

After the war, people who were member in the LPL and family members founded the Amicale L.P.L. – Lëtzebuerger Patriote Liga in order to regroup and find all the members of the LPL, create a union between the remaining family-members, defend the rights of their members and keep in memory the LPL and their achievements in World War II.

== Literature ==
- French: Hoffmann, Serge: Le mouvement de résistance LVL au Luxembourg, Archives nationales, 2004, 158 pages.
- French: Hermes, Tom: Witness of the Time; Luxembourg, ISBN 978-99959-664-1-6
- German: Muller, Carlo: Luxemburg im 2. Weltkrieg, Geschichte für die Primärschule. Luxembourg, 1997
- Luxembourgish: Krantz, Robert: Alex Wagner, politesche Schutzhäftleng am KZ Hinzert, Natzweiler-Struthof, Dachau : Meng Memoiren aus der preisescher Besatzongszäit 1940-1945; Luxembourg, Éditions du Rappel, L.P.P.D. - Comité Central, Imprimerie Centrale, 2010, ill. 220 S. ISBN 978-287978092-4
