= Luxembourg Resistance =

Resistance movements in German-occupied Luxembourg during World War II

When Luxembourg was invaded and annexed by Nazi Germany in 1940, a national consciousness started to emerge. From 1941 onwards, the first resistance groups formed in secret, operating underground and in defiance of the German occupation. Their covert activities included aiding political refugees and those evading conscription into the German forces, as well as disseminating patriotic leaflets to bolster the Luxembourgish population's spirits.

As with other countries, the origins and ideologies of the various Resistance groups were diverse. Motivations ranged from anti-fascism to independence. The political spectrum spanned from communists to clerical-conservative elements.

== Historical development ==
=== Overview ===
People who actively resisted the German occupation in Luxembourg were only a small minority (just like collaborators). The relationship between them and the wider population can be described as "symbiotic". The resistors, without the support of the population, would have struggled to operate, and without the Resistance's activity, the population might have succumbed to the German occupants' propaganda.

=== Early beginnings ===
German troops invaded the country on the morning of 10 May 1940 as part of the wider invasion of the Low Countries and France. By the end of the day, Luxembourg was almost entirely occupied. The Grand Duchess and the government politicians immediately went into exile. With no moves of a French counter-attack nor any news at all from the government, there was a general sense of abandonment in the population. However, their attitude towards the occupiers was robustly hostile from the beginning. Without real means of defence, they had to bend to the Germans' wishes, but little by little acts of sabotage and demonstrations of anti-Nazi sentiment appeared. Phone lines would be cut here and there; in many villages, discussions with the German soldiers turned into brawls from which the Germans had to flee. The consequences of these actions came soon. From late May, the first Luxembourgers were judged by military tribunals for physically fighting with German soldiers or causing offence to the Wehrmacht or Adolf Hitler.

In August, the Gauleiter Gustav Simon arrived in Luxembourg as Chef der Zivilverwaltung, taking over from the military administration. He implemented a "Germanisation" policy to prepare Luxembourg for complete annexation into Germany, which heightened Luxembourgish hostility towards the new regime. The "Spengelskrich" (Luxembourgish; "war of the pins") was one of the first episodes of this spontaneous public resistance. From 14 August 1940, many Luxembourgers publicly wore pins showing the Luxembourgish red lion, which they had worn recently in 1939 for the centenary festivities of Luxembourgish independence. Activists of the pro-German collaborationist Volksdeutsche Bewegung tried to tear off these pins, and fights would break out. The Gestapo intervened against the pin-wearers, calling them "provocateurs". Nevertheless, the wearing of pins continued throughout the occupation and many people found themselves in front of special tribunals, accused of anti-German agitation.

The demolition of the Gëlle Fra monument in October 1940 saw protests from many Luxembourgers. The Gestapo arrested around 50 protesters who were taken to the Villa Pauly, the Gestapo's headquarters in Luxembourg. Until autumn 1940, then, Luxembourgers protested against the German occupation and annexationist measures.

=== Organised groups ===
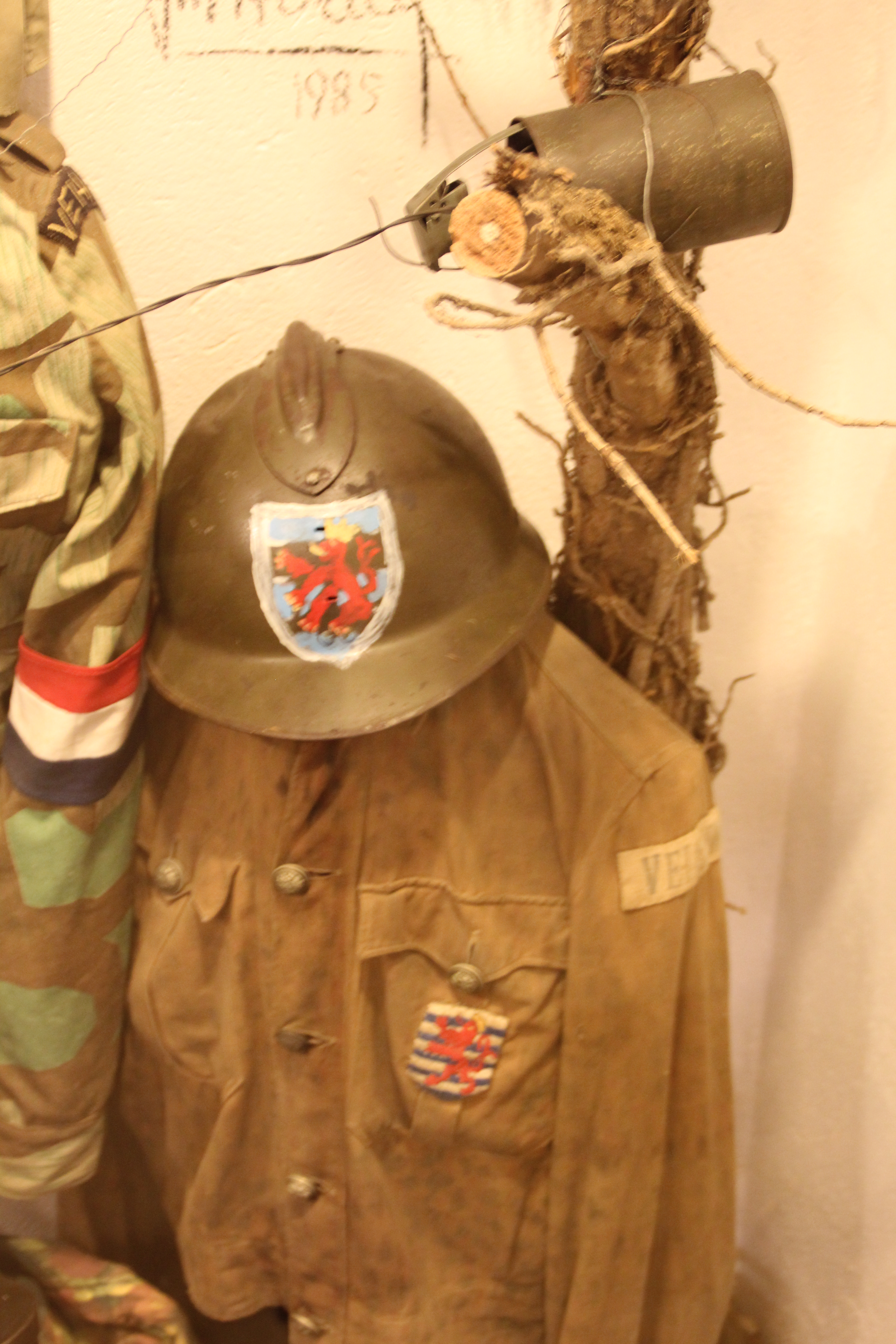
Improvised Luxembourg resistance uniforms, dating to 1944 or 1945, in the collection of the National Museum of Military History

In parallel with individual acts of protest, the summer of 1940 saw the first attempts to organise resistance to the German occupation on a more permanent level. The youth played a decisive role in this, both in schools as well as among young workers. Here, attachment to the idea of an independent Luxembourg as well as anti-fascism were strong motivators.

From August, the heads of the Catholic Scouts in the south of the country met in Esch-sur-Alzette and decided to engage in resistance against the Germans. Similar meetings later took place in Luxembourg City, Diekirch and Wiltz. Scout movement in Luxembourg would be banned and the organisation went underground, under the name Lëtzebuerger Scouten an der Resistenz (LS).

In late September, Raymond Petit, a student at the Lycée of Echternach, founded the group LPL, the Lëtzebuerger Patriote-Liga. Similarly, at the Lycée of Diekirch, Camille Sutor founded the Trei Lëtzeburger Studenten (TLS). The Lëtzebuerger Legioun (LL) was founded on 27 October 1940 by Aloyse Raths, a student at the École normale, in the village of Bissen. In November 1940 a retired customs officer, Alphonse Rodesch, founded a second movement with the name LPL in Clervaux, referring to the World War I movement of that name. In December 1940, Hubert Glesener, Eduard Heyardt and Pierre Fonck formed the LFB (Lëtzebuerger Fräiheets-Bewegong) in Rumelange: this organisation included Catholics, liberals and communists.

By the summer of 1941 other movements were formed around the country, especially in the south and south-west: in Bascharage, Albert Meyers founded the Lëtzebuerger Roude Léif (LRL); in Differdange, Tétange and Rumelange the LFK (Lëtzebuerger Fräiheets-Kämpfer) was formed. In Schifflange left-wing activists formed the "ALWERAJE", the only group willing to work together with the illegal Communist Party of Luxembourg. In Differdange, Josy Goerres created the Service de Renseignements et d’ Action des Patriotes Indépendants Luxembourgeois ("SRA-Pi-Men"). Another LFB group, the Lëtzebuerger Fräiheets- Bond, was formed in Dudelange.

All these groups quickly entered into contact with one another, and several mergers soon took place. First, the TLS merged with the LL, then in June 1941, the LS and LL merged to form the LVL (Lëtzebuerger Volleks-Légioun), the largest Resistance group. On the other hand, an attempt at cooperation between the LFK and LFB in Rumelange ended in betrayal and hundreds of arrests. Further arrests from November 1941 onwards decimated various resistance groups, with the result that the LVL, the LPL and the LRL became the most substantial remaining organisations, attracting the surviving members of the defunct groups.

The only political party to continue to operate underground was the Communist Party of Luxembourg (KPL). However, in August 1942 a police raid weakened communist resistance, and the schoolteacher François Frisch, who was close to the Communist politician Dominique Urbany, founded a new movement, the ALEF (the Aktiv Lëtzebuerger Eenheetsfront géint de Faschismus).

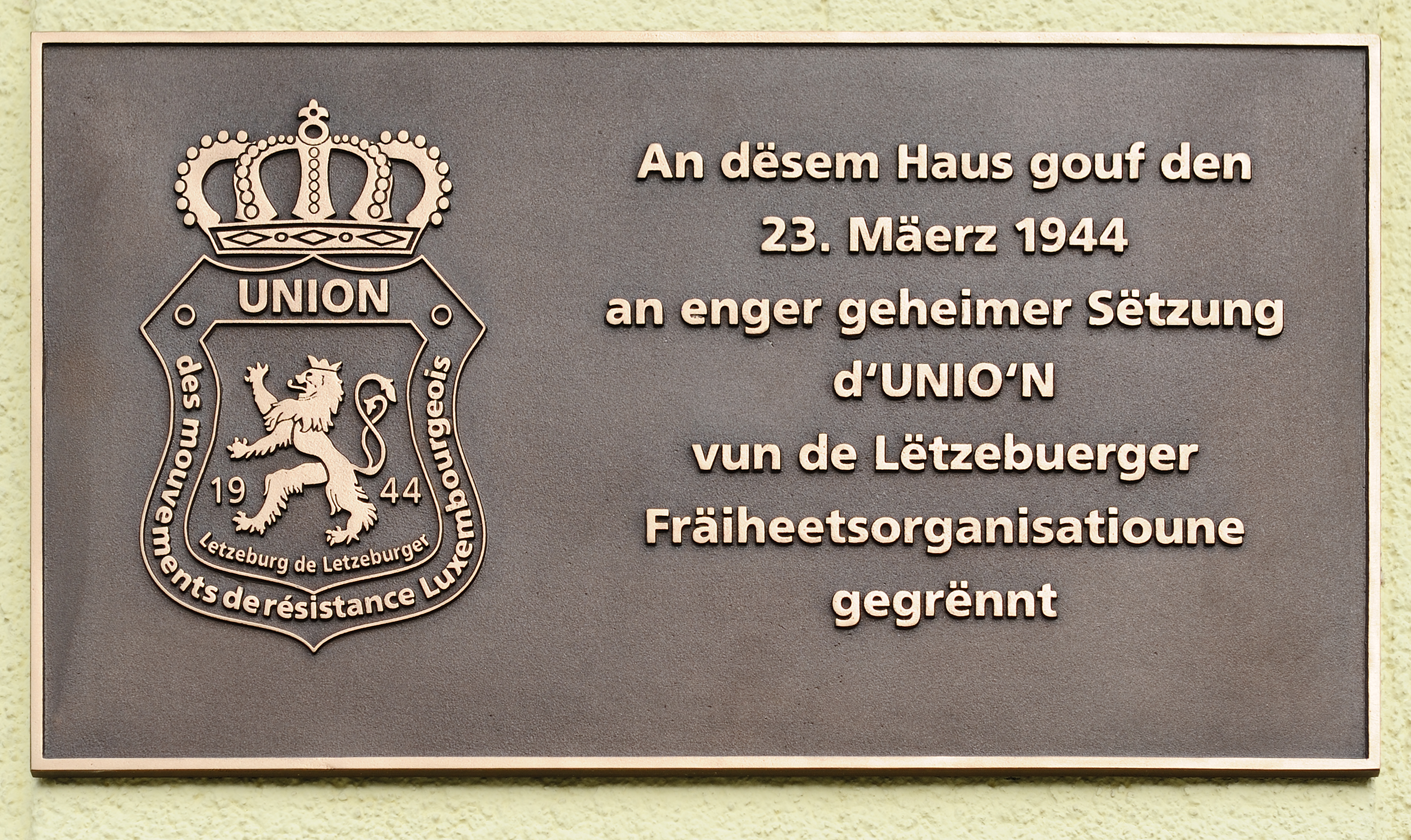
Plaque in Luxembourgish. "In this house the Union of Luxembourgish Freedom Organisations was founded in a secret meeting on 23 March 1944"

From 1943 at the latest, resistance members recognised a need to unify the various organisations. Already in October 1941, attempts had been made to coordinate the different groups' activities against the introduction of mandatory military service. But it was not until after the wave of arrests in 1943 and the executions in February 1944 that the Unio'n vun de Letzeburger Freihétsorganisatio'nen was created on 23 March 1944, uniting the LPL, LRL, and LVL, after long and difficult negotiations. Although the LFB was also a part of these negotiations, it initially chose not to join the Unio'n, but would do so later on 1 September 1944. The Unio'n was headed by a central committee composed of two delegates from each of the 3 member organisations.

=== Structure ===
Christian, liberal and patriotic groups (NS-designation: "Reaktion"):

Unio'n vun de Lëtzebuerger Fräiheetsorganisatiounen (Unio'n), 1944:

- Lëtzeburger Patriote Liga (LPL), 1940
- Lëtzebuerger Legio'n (LL), 1940 → Letzeburger Volleks-Legio'n (LVL), 1941
- Trei Lëtzeburger Studenten (TLS), 1941
- Lëtzebuerger Scouten ≈ Lëtzeburger Freihéts-Kämpfer (LFK), 1940
- Lëtzeburger Ro'de Lé'w, 1941
- Lëtzeburger Freihéts-Bond ≈ Lëtzeburger Freihéts-Bewegong (LFB), 1940
- Patriotes Indépendants ("PI-Men"), 1940

Communist and international-socialist groups (NS-designation: "Rotfront"):

- Aktiv Letzeburger Enhétsfront ge'nt de Faschismus (ALEF), 1940
- Kommunistesche Kampfgrupp Schëffleng ("Alweraje"), 1941

After the war, the LPPD was formed, an umbrella group of the resistance.

=== Multiple "resistances" ===
"The Resistance" never existed as a unified entity; instead resistance was constituted into several separate resistance organisations. The war did not unify Luxembourg any more than it had been previously, although more people became conscious of their national identity, and several collective victories, such as the 1942 Luxembourgish general strike and the failed referendum of 1941 proved that cooperation was possible. The resistance was above all a regional phenomenon: each organisation had its geographical base, and none operated across the whole country. While the different resistance entities were united in their common goals of freeing the country from Nazi German occupation and safeguarding Luxembourgish independence, they had different forms of organisation, ways of working, and political visions for a post-war Luxembourg.

Politically, two tendencies in the resistance can be distinguished, one left-wing (including the Communist Party of Luxembourg) and one right-wing (LVL, LPL Clervaux, Unio'n). There were also organisations that had no particular political programme, which mostly occupied themselves with practical matters; as well as a large number of resistants who were not affiliated to any organisation.

The Communist Party of Luxembourg (KPL) initially did not take hostilities against the occupation, due to its loyalty to the Soviet Union, which was not at war with Germany until June 1941. From May 1942, the KPL advocated the policy of the popular front against the occupation, but also continued to have other political goals in mind, and saw the social democrats as a political rival. The KPL saw the fight against the occupation as merely the first step towards a radical change of the social and political landscape.

The KPL was not the only organisation whose goals kept it from cooperating with other groups. The admission policy of the LVL stated that membership was forbidden to anyone who was a communist or a "drunkard". The right-wing resistance groups were generally to be found in the north, based among rural communities. Religious motivations were a significant factor for them, and they followed a "Marian cult" devoted to Grand Duchess Charlotte. At the same time, the LVL adopted the anti-Semitic ideas of Nazi Germany, and the Unio'n called for a Lebensraum for the Luxembourgish people in terms very similar to those found in Mein Kampf.

For the organised resistance, the prime motivating factor appears to have been nationalism, albeit influenced by socialism for those on the left, or by anti-parliamentary corporatism on the right. This becomes apparent in the resistance organisations' interpretation of history: an emphasis on the "Luxembourgish" emperors of the Holy Roman Empire, a glorification of John the Blind and the participants in the peasant war known as the Kleppelkrich, attacks on the "foreign domination" from 1443 to 1839.

== Activities ==
A Gestapo report from November 1941 states: "The activities of the illegal groups consist of illegal meetings, extensive propaganda activities, spreading so-called LPL-rings and LPL-pictures, procuring weapons and explosives, supporting family members of arrested persons, organising unauthorised emigration and joining enemy countries' armed forces." (Note: Original German: "Die Tätigkeit der illegalen Gruppen erschöpft sich in illegalen Zusammenkünften, ausgedehnten Propagandaaktionen, in der Verbreitung sogenannter LPL-Ringe und LPL-Bilder, in der Waffen- und Sprengstoffbeschaffung, in der Hilfstätigkeit für die Angehörigen von Festgenommenen, in der Organisierung der unbefugten Abwanderungsbewegung und des Eintritts in feindliche Wehrdienste.") This constitutes a fairly good summary of the activities of Luxembourgish resistance.

There were individual acts of sabotage, but in general, sabotage and open, armed resistance did not play a big role in the Luxembourg Resistance. There was no open fighting, except for resistance members fighting when arrest attempts were made. Weapons were acquired to aid the Allies in the liberation of Luxembourg, but this turned out to be unnecessary as the Germans left Luxembourg almost without a fight.

All resistance groups tried and managed to contact the government-in-exile, and many also made contact with Belgian and French Resistance groups.

=== Underground press ===
As elsewhere in German-occupied Europe, the underground press was an important part of resistance activity in Luxembourg. Mainly, the resistors' aim was to counteract the German propaganda that portrayed Luxembourg as an integral part of Germany, under the dictum Heim ins Reich. To this end, they printed flyers by hand or on machines, which were distributed to friends, colleagues and on the street, to spread counter-propaganda. From February 1941, the communist resistance started publishing the newspaper entitled Die Wahrheit. Together with the 19 editions of Ons Zeidong produced by Alwéraje in Schifflange, this left-wing press provided information to workers.

From summer of the same year, Luxembourgers working in the Belgian Resistance started producing De freie Lötzeburger, 17 editions of which appeared between October 1941 and August 1942. Written and printed in Brussels, each edition was transported to Luxembourg for distribution.

=== Border crossings ===
In localities close to the French and Belgian borders, the groups soon faced the problem of how to secretly cross the well-guarded border. Those wishing to leave the country included escaped prisoners of war, Allied pilots who had been shot down, or resistance members wishing to travel to Britain to join the Allied armed forces, and this made an organised network necessary. Additionally, from 1943, the Resistance helped numerous men dodge conscription into the Wehrmacht and escape into France and Belgium. An estimated 2,000 people were moved across the border of Luxembourg, and several resistance members were killed at these border crossings.

=== Intelligence and sabotage ===
Resistance members were aware of the value of intelligence for the British. The beginnings of intelligence work in Luxembourg were difficult, but attempts to send information to the British were made.

Reports by doctor Fernand Schwachtgen, and signed "John the Blind", mostly reached London via the "Famille Martin" network, founded in Marseille by Walter Hamber, an Austrian Jew living in Luxembourg. These contained much information of great value, including information on V-1 and V-2 rocket testing sites in Peenemünde, which led to the Allies bombing these on the night of 17 August 1943.

From August 1942, the Luxembourgish businessman Edouard Hemmer, residing in Belgium, worked with Jean Fosty of the Belgian network Zéro to set up the intelligence network "Organisation Tod", or OT. OT gathered information from Luxembourg, which was then transmitted to London through Zéro. In late April 1943, Hemmer was arrested, and OT ceased its activity.

From autumn of 1943, Luxembourgish intelligence was started up again. It was primarily Josy Goerres who saw the importance of political, economic and military intelligence. His reports generally reached the government-in-exile via Belgium; others were transmitted through the hands of the doctor and politician Charles Marx, who had close contact with the French Resistance and was located in Aude in southern France.

A few acts of sabotage were organised. In steel plants, there was a "spirit of sabotage", which contributed to slowing the rate of production. Two acts of sabotage resulting in trail derailments were organised at the initiative of Joseph Hittesdorf.

=== Fighting ===
400 men from Luxembourg, many of whom had refused to serve in, or who had deserted from, the Wehrmacht, fought in the French maquis, where they were particularly active in the regions of Lyon, Grenoble, and the Ardennes. Many were killed in the war. Others, like Antoine Diederich, rose to high rank in resistance groups. Diederich, known only as "Capitaine Baptiste", had 77 maquis soldiers under his command and is best known for attacking Riom prison, where he and his fighters freed 114 inmates who had been sentenced to death. Additionally around 500 men from Luxembourg left to fight in the Ardennes section of the Witte Brigade, where they formed the Red Lion Brigade. 74 of them died.

During the Battle of the Bulge most of the resistance members continued their engagement by helping the U.S. Forces during the battle. Shortly before however, resistance members fought alone in the only major open battle fought between the Luxembourgish Resistance against soldiers of the Waffen-SS during the Battle of Vianden.

=== Referendum and general strike ===
Two of the Resistance's most notable feats were the referendum of 10 October 1941, and the general strike of September 1942.

The planned census of 1941 contained three questions on people's nationality, native language and ethnicity. The German authorities intended for Luxembourgers to answer "German" to all three questions, thus accepting annexation by Nazi Germany. Resistance organisations spread awareness of the nature and significance of the upcoming census, and distributed leaflets strongly encouraging the population to answer Dräimol Letzebuerg ("three times Luxembourgish"). Initial results from straw polls showed that the population was following the advice by an overwhelming majority, and the actual census on 10 October was cancelled, which was widely seen as a propaganda defeat for the Germans.

The 1942 general strike came about as a result of the introduction of conscription into the German military for Luxembourgish males born between 1920 and 1927, announced on 30 August 1942.

== Notable members ==
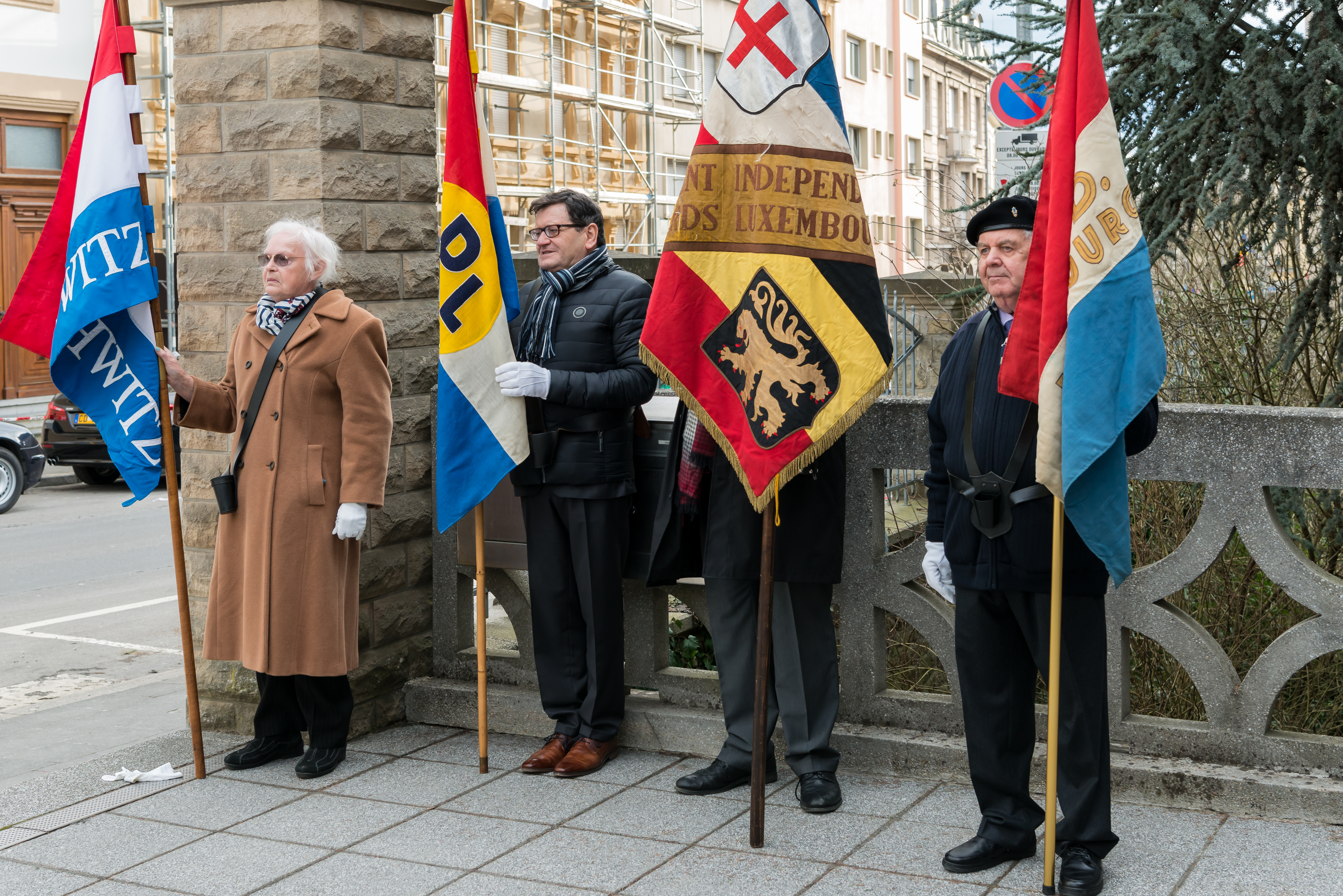
Members of resistance veterans' associations in Luxembourg City, 2016

- Victor Abens
- Lucien Dury
- Emile Krieps
- Charles Marx
- Aloyse Raths
- Ernest Toussaint
- Albert Wingert

== See also ==
- 1942 Luxembourgish general strike
- Battle of Vianden, the only major open battle fought between Luxembourgish resistance members and soldiers of the Waffen-SS
- German occupation of Luxembourg during World War II
- Luxembourgish collaboration with Nazi Germany
- Luxembourg in World War II
- National Resistance Museum, Luxembourg
- Dosbaach Bunker
