= Josef Ackermann (politician) =

German Nazi politician (1905–1997)

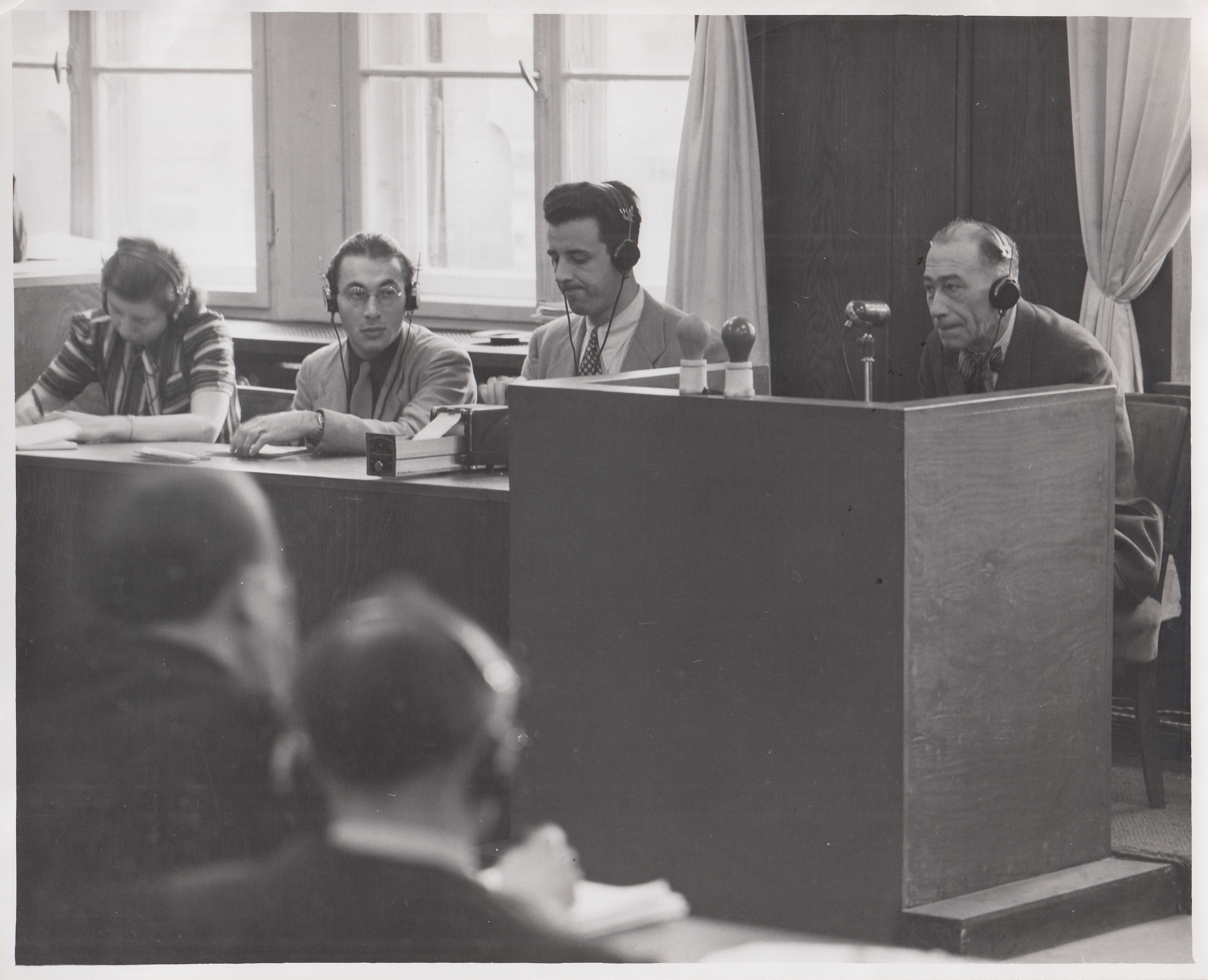
- Ackermann testifying at the Pohl Trial (1947)

Head of Aryanization Department Civil Administration Area of Luxembourg
- In office 1940–1944

Reichstag Deputy
- In office 9 December 1941 – 8 May 1945

Personal details
- Born: 26 April 1905 Arenberg-Immendorf, Kingdom of Prussia, German Empire
- Died: 5 March 1997 (aged 91) Vallendar, Rhineland-Palatinate, Germany
- Party: Nazi Party

Josef Ackermann (26 April 1905 – 5 March 1997) was a German Nazi Party politician and member of the Reichstag. He was also an SA-Brigadeführer in the Nazi Sturmabteilung (SA). During the Second World War, he was in charge of the Aryanization program in Luxembourg. Following Germany's defeat, he was extradited to Luxembourg and sentenced to prison.

== Nazi Party career ==
Born the son of a farmer in Arenberg-Immendorf (today, part of Koblenz), Ackermann attended primary and commercial trade school from 1911 to 1919. After joining the Nazi Party in 1925, he later became a Gauredner (English: Gau spokesman).

Following the 1933 Nazi seizure of power, Ackermann in 1936 was named Regional Inspector in Gau Koblenz-Trier (renamed Gau Moselland in 1942) under Gauleiter Gustav Simon. Ackermann unsuccessfully sought a nomination to the Reichstag for the elections in March 1936 and April 1938. On 9 December 1941, he was appointed to the Reichstag to succeed a deceased member, Detlef Dern, representing electoral constituency 21, Koblenz–Trier. Ackermann also was a member of the Sturmabteilung (SA), the Nazi paramilitary unit, in which he attained the ranks of SA-Oberführer on 9 November 1938 and SA-Brigadeführer on 9 November 1943.

After the conquest and occupation of Luxembourg by German troops in May 1940, Simon, in addition to Gauleiter, was named the Chief of Civil Administration (CDZ) for Luxembourg. He took Ackermann with him to be part of his staff and appointed him head of Department IV, which was in charge of the Aryanization of Luxembourgian Jewish assets.

In the spring of 1945, Ackermann and his wife fled to an air raid shelter in Arenberg that had spots reserved for Nazi Party members. A one-legged German soldier, who had recently been at the military hospital, became upset that Ackermann would be permitted entrance and protested. Ackermann punched the soldier in response. Angered by this, the shelter attendees refused entry to Ackermann and his wife.

== Post-war life ==
After the war, Ackermann was interned by the Allies and, a short time later, he was extradited to Luxembourg. According to documents from the Central Office of the State Justice Administration for the Investigation of National Socialist Crimes, he was sentenced to 10 years of hard labour on 21 July 1950, in Luxembourg. Following a clemency decision on 23 April 1951, his sentence was reduced to 7 years imprisonment. Ackermann was released and returned to Germany in the early 1950s when his prior years of internment were counted against the reduced sentence. He died in Vallendar in the Rhineland-Palatinate in March 1997.
