= Groß Glienicker See =

Lake in Berlin and Brandenburg, Germany

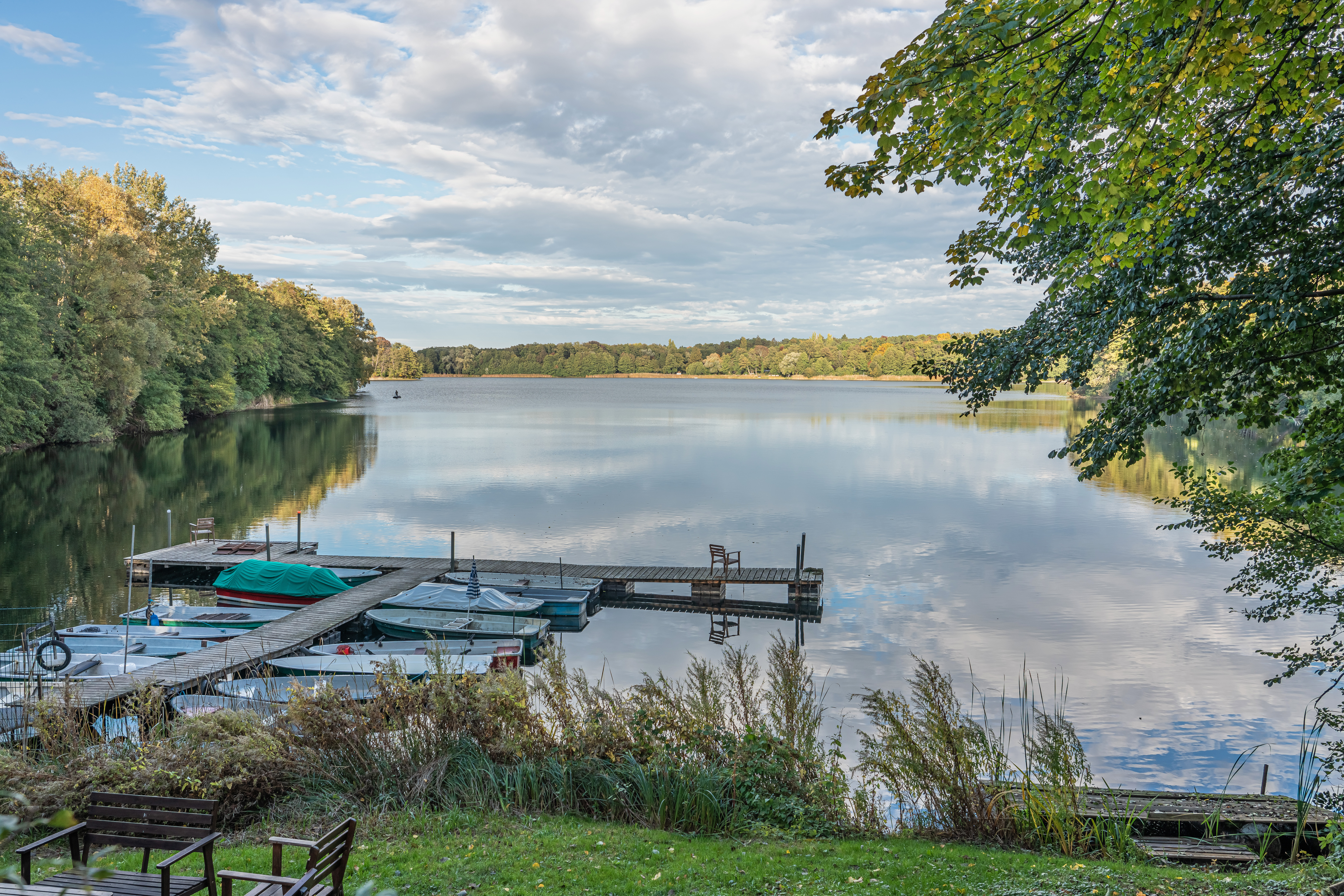

- Location within Brandenburg
- Location: Brandenburg / Berlin
- Coordinates: 52°28′0″N 13°7′0″E
- Basin countries: Germany
- Surface area: 0.66 km^{2} (0.25 sq mi)
- Average depth: 6 m (20 ft)
- Max. depth: 11 m (36 ft)
- Shore length^{1}: 5.2 km (3.2 mi)
- Surface elevation: 31.6 m (104 ft)
- Settlements: Berlin, Potsdam
- ^{1} Shore length is not a well-defined measure.

Groß Glienicker See (German pronunciation: [ˈɡʁoːs ˈɡliː.nɪkɐ zeː]) is a lake in the states of Brandenburg and Berlin, Germany. At an elevation of 31.6 m, its surface area is 0.66 km². The border between the city of Potsdam and the city of Berlin runs in a north–south direction through the center of the lake, with the Potsdam locality of Groß Glienicke on the left shore and the Berlin locality of Kladow on the right shore.

== Geology ==
Together with the Sacrower See to the south and the Heiliger See in Potsdam, Glienicker See forms a chain of glacial lakes. It lacks a surface outlet and is almost entirely fed by groundwater.

== The lake during the Cold War ==
The border between West Berlin and East Germany in the center of the lake was marked by buoys. The Berlin Wall on the west and south shores prevented access to or even a sight of the shore by East Germans. For those in West Berlin the lake was a popular place for swimming. One could swim (or in the winter walk over the ice) up to the buoys.

== Alexander Haus ==
Alexander House stands on the north-western side of the lake. The home was constructed in 1927 by Dr. Alfred Alexander on land leased from Otto von Wollank, with the intention of building a weekend house. The home was photographed by Lotte Jacobi the following year. Increasingly persecuted and unsafe in Nazi Germany, in 1936 the Alexanders fled to England.

From 1937-1944, the home was occupied by composer and music publisher Will Meisel and actress Eliza Illiard. The first member of the Alexander family to return to the home was Dr. Alexander's son, Hanns Alexander, in 1946. From 1952-2003, the Kühne and Fuhrmann families lived in the home. The house then fell into disrepair from 2003 onwards, until 2013 when writer Thomas Harding, the great-grandson of Alfred Alexander, discovered the building. The home was restored and given monument status in 2014. Harding wrote The House by the Lake (2015), detailing the history of the house, the village and the people who lived there.
