= Alfred Alexander =

Doctor and medical researcher

- Born: 7 March 1880
- Died: 15 May 1950 (aged 70)
- Occupation: Physician
- Spouse: Henny Alexander
- Children: Bella Jakobi, Elsie Harding, Hanns Alexander and Paul Alexander

Alfred Alexander (7 March 1880 – 15 May 1950) was a German physician who served as President of the Berlin Association of Doctors during the 1930s. He was a leading researcher into the cure for leukaemia. One of his patients was Sir Ivone Kirkpatrick. In 1935 he and his family fled Nazi Germany to England, where he established a medical practice, with a clinic in Harley Street. He died in 1950.

Alfred Alexander was married to Henny Alexander and had four children: Bella Jakobi, Elsie Harding, Hanns Alexander and Paul Alexander, all of whom lived in England after leaving Nazi Germany. He was awarded the Iron Cross for his medical service at Saverne during World War I.

For his 50th birthday party, he received regards from the glitterati of Berlin, including scientist Albert Einstein, Nobel Prize winner James Franck, artists Rudolf Grossman, Hans Purrmann and Emil Hertz, writers Leonhard Frank, Rudolf Kayser, Alfred Polgar, Walter Hasenclever and Jozsef Lengyel, and a large group of actors, dancers, singers and musicians.

As father to the war crimes investigator Hanns Alexander, Alfred Alexander is featured in Hanns and Rudolf, a dual biography by Thomas Harding (grandson of his daughter Elsie). Alexander is also a character in Harding's non-fiction book The House by the Lake (2015), which describes the house Alexander had built at Groß Glienicker See, the family's life there, and those who lived there after the Alexanders had fled the country.

== See also ==
- Alexander Haus

== Sources ==
- Groß Glienicke Kreis: Die Enteignung des Dr. Alexander
- Newsweek: 1 War Crimes Investigation Team
- Guardian: My Uncle the Nazi Hunter
