= Gustav Simon =

German Nazi Party official (1900–1945)

- Gauleiter of Moselland, Gustav Simon

Gauleiter of Gau Moselland (Gau Koblenz-Trier 1931-1941)
- In office 1 June 1931 – 8 May 1945
- Appointed by: Adolf Hitler
- Deputy: Fritz Reckmann
- Preceded by: Position created
- Succeeded by: Position abolished

Chief of the Civil Administration of Luxembourg
- In office 29 July 1940 – September 1944
- Deputy: Heinrich Christian Siekmeier
- Preceded by: Position created
- Succeeded by: Position abolished

Personal details
- Born: Gustav Johannes Simon; 2 August 1900 Saarbrücken, Rhine Province, Kingdom of Prussia, German Empire
- Died: 18 December 1945 (aged 45) Paderborn, Province of Westphalia, Allied-occupied Germany
- Cause of death: Suicide by hanging
- Party: Nazi Party
- Other political affiliations: National Socialist Freedom Party
- Education: Johann Wolfgang Goethe University
- Profession: Teacher
- Nickname: The Toadstool of Hermeskeil

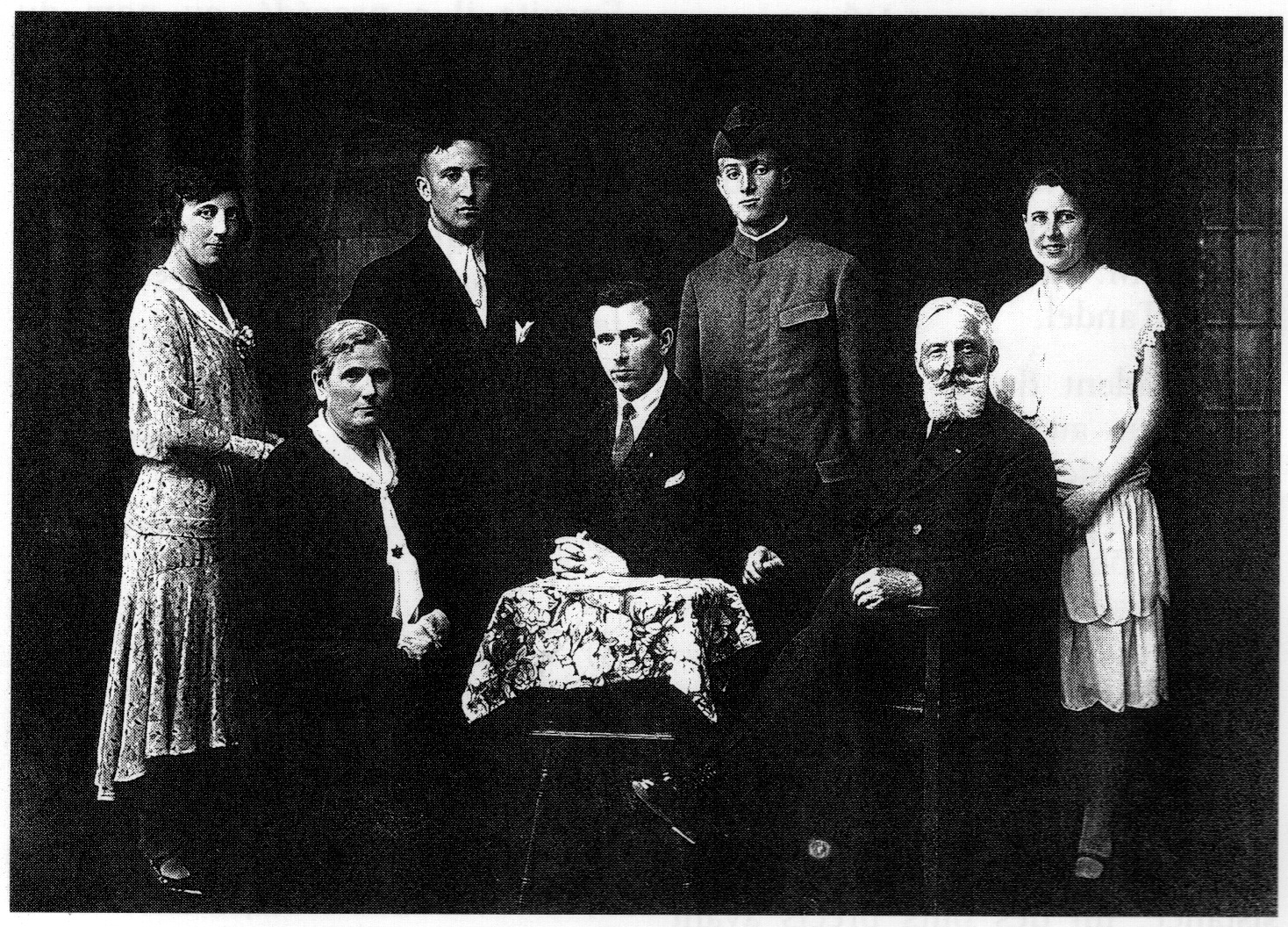
Gustav Simon (center) with family in the 1930s.

Gustav Simon (2 August 1900– 18 December 1945) was a Nazi Party official who served as Gauleiter of Gau Moselland from 1931 to 1945 and, from 1940 until 1944, as Chief of Civil Administration in occupied Luxembourg. In this position, he was chiefly responsible for the Holocaust in Luxembourg. After the end of the Second World War, Simon was arrested and died in custody but the circumstances of his death are disputed.

== Early years ==
Gustav Simon's father was a railway official. His parents farmed small plots on the Hunsrück. Simon went to a Volksschule in Saarbrücken, and thereafter underwent training as a schoolteacher in Merzig. Although he passed his teaching examinations, he was not able to secure a teaching job. He then decided to work towards obtaining his Abitur, and meanwhile he was employed as a railway assistant in Hermeskeil and as a customs broker from 1920 to 1922. He passed his Abitur, and studied economics and law at the Johann Wolfgang Goethe University in Frankfurt am Main from 1922 to 1925, planning to become a teacher. In 1923, while still a student, Simon was a member of a völkisch College Group (Völkische Hochschulgruppe) in Frankfurt, and was elected to the position of Second Chairman that year.

== Nazi Party career ==
In 1924, when the Nazi Party was banned after the failed Beer Hall Putsch, Simon joined the National Socialist Freedom Party, a Nazi front organization. After the Nazi Party was re-founded, Simon joined it on 14 August 1925, with membership number 17,017, thereby becoming one of the "Old Fighters" ("alte Kämpfer") who would later automatically be decorated with the Golden Party Badge. Shortly after joining, Simon founded the Hochschulgruppe Frankfurt of the National Socialist German Students' League and in 1927, he was chosen by the majority of students to be President of the General Students' Committee. In addition, he had already founded a local NSDAP local branch (Ortsgruppe) in Hermeskeil in autumn 1926. After completing his studies in May 1927, he was employed as a business teacher in Völklingen. Before a year was even out, though, he left the school and began working full-time for the Nazi Party at the invitation of Robert Ley, then the Gauleiter of the southern Rhineland.

Beginning in 1928, Simon quickly rose in the Party hierarchy. In 1928 he became NSDAP Bezirksleiter (District Leader) for the Trier-Birkenfeld district, and in 1929 for the Koblenz-Trier district. In November 1929, he was elected to the Koblenz City Council and the Landtag of Rhine Province. On 14 September 1930, he was elected a member of the Reichstag for electoral district 21, Koblenz-Trier, a seat he would retain until the fall of the Nazi regime in May 1945. On 1 June 1931, Adolf Hitler appointed him Gauleiter of the newly created Gau Koblenz-Trier when Ley's Gau was divided in two. In 1933 Simon published a Nazi newspaper, the Coblenzer Nationalblatt, and served as its editor-in-chief. After the Nazi seizure of power, he was appointed the president of the Rhineland Landtag on 10 April 1933 and became a member of the Prussian State Council in July 1933. In 1934 came an appointment as a Prussian Provincial councilor for the Rhineland and, in September 1935, he was made a member of the Academy for German Law. Unlike most other Gauleiters, Simon did not belong to the SA or the SS; however, he was a member of the National Socialist Motor Corps (Nationalsozialistisches Kraftfahrerkorps, NSKK) being promoted to NSKK-Gruppenführer on 9 November 1935 and NSKK-Obergruppenführer on 30 January 1939.

At the start of the Second World War, Simon was made a member of the Defense Committee for Wehrkreis (Military District) XII that included his Gau, which was renamed Moselland on 24 January 1941. On 16 November 1942, Simon was named Reich Defense Commissioner for the Gau. In this capacity, he had responsibility for civil defense, air defense and evacuation matters, as well as wartime rationing and suppression of black market activity.

Simon had the reputation of a notoriously corrupt administrator. Considered by many as one of the least able and most arrogant of the Gauleiters, his jurisdiction was riddled with corruption and nepotism. Due to his short stature and toxic personality, he was derisively referred to as the "Toadstool of Hermeskeil."

== Chief of Civil Administration in Luxembourg ==
After the German invasion and conquest on 10 May 1940, the Grand Duchy of Luxembourg first fell under the Military Administration in Belgium and Northern France, commanded by General der Infanterie, Alexander von Falkenhausen. Under this commander, Simon took over civil administration of Luxembourg on 25 July 1940. The military occupation status ended on 2 August 1940, when Simon was appointed Chief of Civil Administration (Chef der Zivilverwaltung, CdZ) by a decree from the Führer (Führererlass). His representative in this function was the Regierungspräsident (Government District President) of Trier, Heinrich Christian Siekmeier. Their job was to give the Grand Duchy of Luxembourg – now the CdZ-Gebiet Luxemburg – German administrative structures, and to prepare it to become an integral part of the Greater German Reich.

=== Political assimilation ===
On 6 August 1940, Simon ordered all police functions removed from the Luxembourg gendarmerie and entrusted to German police units. On 14 August, he proscribed references to the "State" or "Grand Duchy" of Luxembourg and suspended its constitution. On 26 August, the Reichsmark was introduced as legal tender and, on 20 January 1941, the Luxembourg franc was abolished. All existing political parties were banned and the only authorized political institution was the Volksdeutsche Bewegung (Ethnic German Movement) whose slogan was "Heim ins Reich" (Home to the Reich). Its declared aim was the full incorporation of Luxembourg into Nazi Germany. On 23 October 1940, Simon issued proclamations dissolving the Parliament and Council of State. In January 1941, all manual laborers were required to join the German Labor Front. On 30 August 1942, Simon ordered that all Luxembourger males born between 1920 and 1924 were subject to compulsory military conscription into the Wehrmacht. In protest, a general strike broke out the next day and was ruthlessly suppressed by Simon who declared martial law. He threatened striking workers with execution unless they returned to their factories, and 20 strike leaders were eventually executed at the Hinzert concentration camp. In addition, some 2,000 persons were arrested and 290 high school students who had participated were deported to "re-education" camps in Germany.

=== Germanization ===
In addition to the political assimilation, Simon pursued a harsh and unrelenting policy of cultural Germanization. On 6 August 1940, he ordered the closure of all French schools, and banned the use of both the French and Luxembourgish languages. German was declared the exclusive official language for government, education, the media, law and the economy. All commercial signs, building inscriptions, advertising and printed matter, as well as all traffic, street and road signs, were required to be in German. Violations were punishable by fine or imprisonment.

Additionally, on 31 January 1941, Simon issued orders that Luxembourgers with non-German or foreign given names were required to adopt the German version of that name or, if no such form existed, to select a German given name. Likewise, those whose surname had been of German origin, but later changed to a non-German form, were required to resume the original surname.

On 30 August 1942, Simon delivered a speech and announced the introduction of compulsory military service and the conferral of German citizenship upon the affected conscription years. In Alsace and Lorraine, the exact same step toward conscription had been taken just a few days earlier.

=== Jewish persecution and genocide ===
There were estimated to be about 3,500 Jews in Luxembourg at the beginning of the Nazi occupation and Simon immediately began the process of attempting to make the area Judenfrei. On 5 September 1940, he issued an order for the expropriation of the Jewish population. This was followed by the introduction of the Nuremberg Laws into Luxembourg. Jews were encouraged to emigrate voluntarily, principally to Vichy France or Portugal. In September 1941, the public wearing of the Star of David to identify Jews was ordered, and Jews were rounded up and confined to an internment camp near Troisvierges. By October 1941, only about 750 Jews remained in the country and forced deportations began to ghettos or extermination camps in the east. Nearly all were forcibly removed in eight transports between October 1941 and September 1943. It is estimated that of the 634 deported, only 36 survived. In total, about 1,945 of Luxembourg's Jews perished by the war's end.

== Capture and death ==
Simon fled Luxembourg on 9 September 1944, ahead of the advancing U.S. Army that entered Luxembourg City without a fight the next day. On 25 September 1944, Simon was made commander of the Nazi militia, the Volkssturm, in Gau Moselland. However, in spring 1945, the Allied offensive continued and the Gau's capital, Koblenz, fell on 19 March. Simon fled eastward and, when the war ended in May, he went into hiding in Upsprunge, a community in Salzkotten, Westphalia, using his mother's maiden name of Woffler and posing as a gardener. On 10 December 1945, he was seized by British Captain Hanns Alexander and a detachment of soldiers. The next day he was taken to a British Army prison in Paderborn where he unsuccessfully tried to kill himself by cutting his wrists.

Following his death on 18 December 1945, several contradictory rumors persisted about the place and the circumstances of Simon's end. The stories, however, can be grouped into two fundamental versions:

- The official version has it that Simon died in Paderborn, as the registry office there recorded on the death certificate (registration number 66/1946, February 1946). Simon is said to have hanged himself in his cell with a piece of rope fashioned from his bedding, shortly before he was to have been handed over to Luxembourg.
- The second, unofficial version has it that Simon died in Luxembourg. After the British Occupation Administration agreed to hand him over, he was to have been taken by car by two Luxembourgers from Paderborn to Luxembourg City so that he could be brought to book before a court there. Shortly before reaching Luxembourg, at Waldhaff, there was an incident provoked by Simon in which he was killed. This version has it that to cover up the murder, the media, among them the agency DANA (Deutsch-Amerikanische Nachrichtenagentur) and the Tageblatt, were furnished with information by Captain Alexander, about the "suicide in Paderborn."

In any event, on the morning of 20 December, Simon's body was taken to the prison in the Luxembourg City district of Grund, where it was photographed by the press, and then buried. Simon's premature death thwarted any trial. The murder version has been investigated in studies based on both British and Luxembourgish archival documents. Thomas Harding revealed that his great-uncle, Hanns Alexander, was believed by his family to have been involved in the murder:

Gustav Simon had been alive when Hanns picked him up from Paderborn prison, and that he did not hang himself, as Hanns had written in his field report. Instead, Hanns had then been joined by seven Luxembourg partisans, Captain Leone Muller among them, taken Simon to a forest outside of Paderborn and executed him. Having sworn an oath never to reveal what took place, Hanns was alleged to have covered up the murder, presenting the 'official version' at the press conference the next day in Luxembourg. This alternative account is bolstered by various inconsistencies with the official version: why, for instance, if Simon had committed suicide in prison on 18 December 1945, was a death certificate not issued until 8 February 1946, a full two months after his death? Equally, how could a man who was 1.6m high possibly hang himself from a bedpost that was 1.4m high? Even if such a feat was technically possible, how could the guard posted outside his door on suicide watch, for twenty-four hours a day, not have noticed what was taking place inside the cell? Finally, if the suicide had taken place, why had so many people come forward saying that the official version was untrue? According to this unofficial account, the murder was motivated either by Luxembourg collaborators, who did not want Simon to reveal their identities in court or by partisans, angry at Simon's treatment of the Luxembourg nationalists and Jews.

== See also ==
- List of people who died by suicide by hanging

== Sources ==
- Arndt, Ino: Luxemburg. In: Wolfgang Benz (Hg.): Dimension des Völkermords. Die Zahl der jüdischen Opfer des Nationalsozialismus. Sources and accounts of contemporary history, published by the Institut für Zeitgeschichte, Band 33, R. Oldenbourg Verlag, München 1991, S. 95–104, ISBN 978-3-486-54631-6.
- Dostert, Paul: Luxemburg zwischen Selbstbehauptung und nationaler Selbstaufgabe. Die deutsche Besatzungspolitik und die Volksdeutsche Bewegung 1940-1945. Diss. Freiburg, Luxembourg 1985.
- Kienast, E. (Hg.): Der Großdeutsche Reichstag. IV. Wahlperiode, Beginn am 10. April 1938, verlängert bis zum 30. Januar 1947. Berlin 1943.
- Miller, Michael D.; Schulz, Andreas (2021). Gauleiter: The Regional Leaders of the Nazi Party and Their Deputies, 1925 - 1945. Vol. 3 (Fritz Sauckel - Hans Zimmermann). Fonthill Media. ISBN 978-1-781-55826-3.
- Orlow, Dietrich (1973). The History of the Nazi Party: 1933-1945. University of Pittsburgh Press. ISBN 0-822-9-3253-9.
- Schneider, Volker: Gauleiter Gustav Simon, der "Moselgau" und das ehemalige SS-Sonderlager/KZ Hinzert. In: Hans-Georg Meyer/Hans Berkessel (Hg.): Die Zeit des Nationalsozialismus in Rhineland-Palatinate. Für die Außenwelt seid ihr tot. Hermann Schmidt, Mainz 2000, Bd. 2, S. 276–307, ISBN 978-3-87439-454-3.
- Spang, Paul: Gustav Simons Ende. In: Hémecht. Zeitschrift für Luxemburger Geschichte. Revue d'histoire luxembourgeoise 44 (1992) 3, S. 303–317.
