= 1948 Gatow air disaster =

1948 mid-air collision over Berlin, Germany

Accident
- Date: 5 April 1948
- Summary: Mid-air collision
- Site: near RAF Gatow Berlin, Germany; 52.474°N 13.138°E
- Total fatalities: 15
- Total survivors: 0

First aircraft
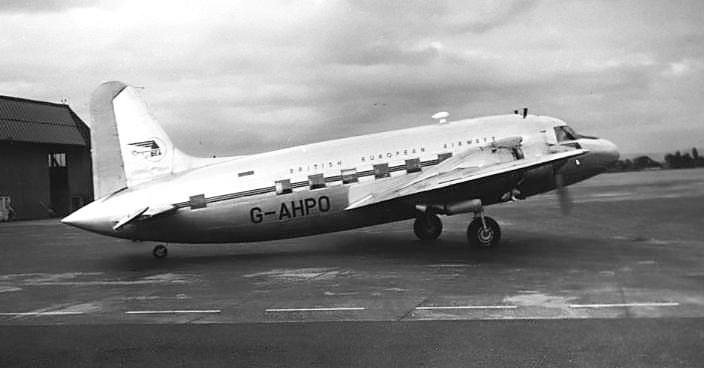
- A BEA Vickers Viking 1B similar to the aircraft involved in the incident at Manchester in August 1952
- Type: Vickers 610 Viking 1B
- Operator: British European Airways
- Registration: G-AIVP
- Flight origin: United Kingdom
- Destination: RAF Gatow
- Passengers: 10
- Crew: 4
- Survivors: 0

Second aircraft
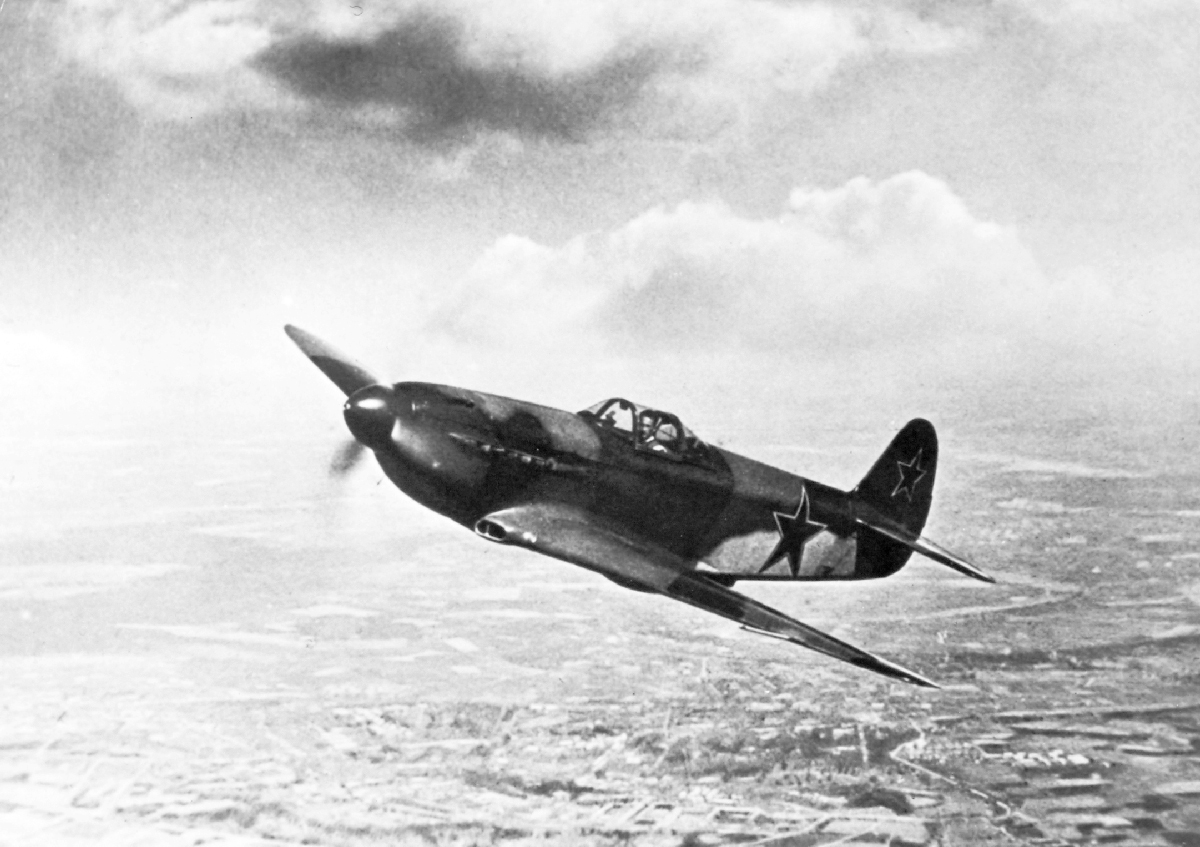
- A Yak-3 similar to the aircraft that caused the collision
- Type: Yakovlev Yak-3
- Operator: Soviet Air Force
- Passengers: 0
- Crew: 1
- Survivors: 0

The 1948 Gatow air disaster was a mid-air collision in the airspace above Berlin, Germany, that occurred on 5 April, sparking an international incident. A British European Airways (BEA) Vickers VC.1B Viking airliner crashed near RAF Gatow air base, after being struck by a Soviet Air Force Yakovlev Yak-3 fighter aircraft. All ten passengers and four crew on board the Viking were killed, as was the Soviet pilot. The disaster resulted in a diplomatic standoff between the United Kingdom and United States on one hand, and the Soviet Union on the other, and intensified distrust leading up to the Berlin Blockade in the early years of the Cold War.

== Historical background ==
The historical backdrop of the air disaster was the intensifying clash over the future of Berlin and Germany. At the end of World War II, the Allied Powers agreed to divide and occupy Germany, including the capital Berlin. Through a series of agreements it was decided to divide Germany and Berlin into four sectors; the Americans, British and French shared the western half of Berlin, while the Soviets occupied East Berlin. The division of Germany placed Berlin well inside the Soviet zone of occupation and supplies to West Berlin had to be brought in either overland or by air from the American, British and French zones in the Western half of Germany. Germany was jointly governed by the wartime allies through an Allied Control Council, which periodically met to co-ordinate events and discuss the future of Germany; while Berlin was jointly governed by the Allied Kommandatura.

In 1947, a tense diplomatic and military standoff began to unfold between the United States, the United Kingdom and the Soviet Union over the future of Germany. The Americans and Western European allies wanted to include the sectors of Germany which they controlled in the Marshall Plan, an economic plan to rebuild Europe after the devastation of the war. The Soviets perceived the Marshall Plan to be the foundation for an anti-Soviet alliance and pressured the Americans, British and French to back down. On 20 March 1948, the Soviet representative walked out of the meeting of the Allied Control Council, and on 31 March 1948, the United States Congress approved funding for the Marshall Plan. Soviet troops then began to block the corridor that brought supplies from the western zones of Germany to West Berlin. In response, an increased number of aircraft brought supplies by air from west Germany to Tempelhof airfield in the American sector and Gatow airfield in the British sector of Berlin. At the same time Soviet military aircraft began to violate airspace in West Berlin and harass (or what the military called "buzz") flights in and out of West Berlin. Despite the danger of flying in such conditions, civilian aircraft continued to fly in and out of Berlin.

== Flight details ==
The aircraft involved in the incident was a Vickers 610 Viking 1B with the registration G-AIVP; and had first flown in 1947. The BEA flight had a four-member crew, all of whom were former members of the Royal Air Force. There were ten passengers on board, most of whom were British.

== Crash ==
In the days preceding the incident, Soviet military aircraft had been buzzing American and British passenger aircraft while they passed through the western zones of the city. The Viking was on a scheduled commercial flight from London via Hamburg to RAF Gatow in the British Sector of Berlin. At approximately 2:30pm while the Viking was in the airport's safety area levelling off to land, a Soviet Yak-3 approached from behind. Eyewitnesses testified that as the Viking made a left-hand turn prior to its approach to land, the fighter dived beneath it, climbed sharply, and clipped the port wing of the airliner with its starboard wing. The impact ripped off both colliding wings and the Viking crashed inside the Soviet Sector, at Hahneberg, Staaken, just outside the British Sector (about 2.5 miles (4.0 km) northwest of Gatow), and exploded. The Yak-3 crashed near a farmhouse on Heerstrasse just inside the British sector. All the occupants of both aircraft died on impact.

It was also testified that the Yak pilot was doing aerobatics prior to the accident; the Soviet Air Force had not informed Royal Air Force air traffic controllers at Gatow of its presence. They claimed that the fighter was coming in to land at Dallgow, a nearby Soviet airbase (although examination of the wreckage showed that the undercarriage was still locked up, so this was unlikely).

Allied investigators later concluded that the "collision was caused by the action of the Yak fighter, which was in disregard of the accepted rules of flying and, in particular, of the quadripartite flying rules to which Soviet authorities were parties."

== Aftermath ==
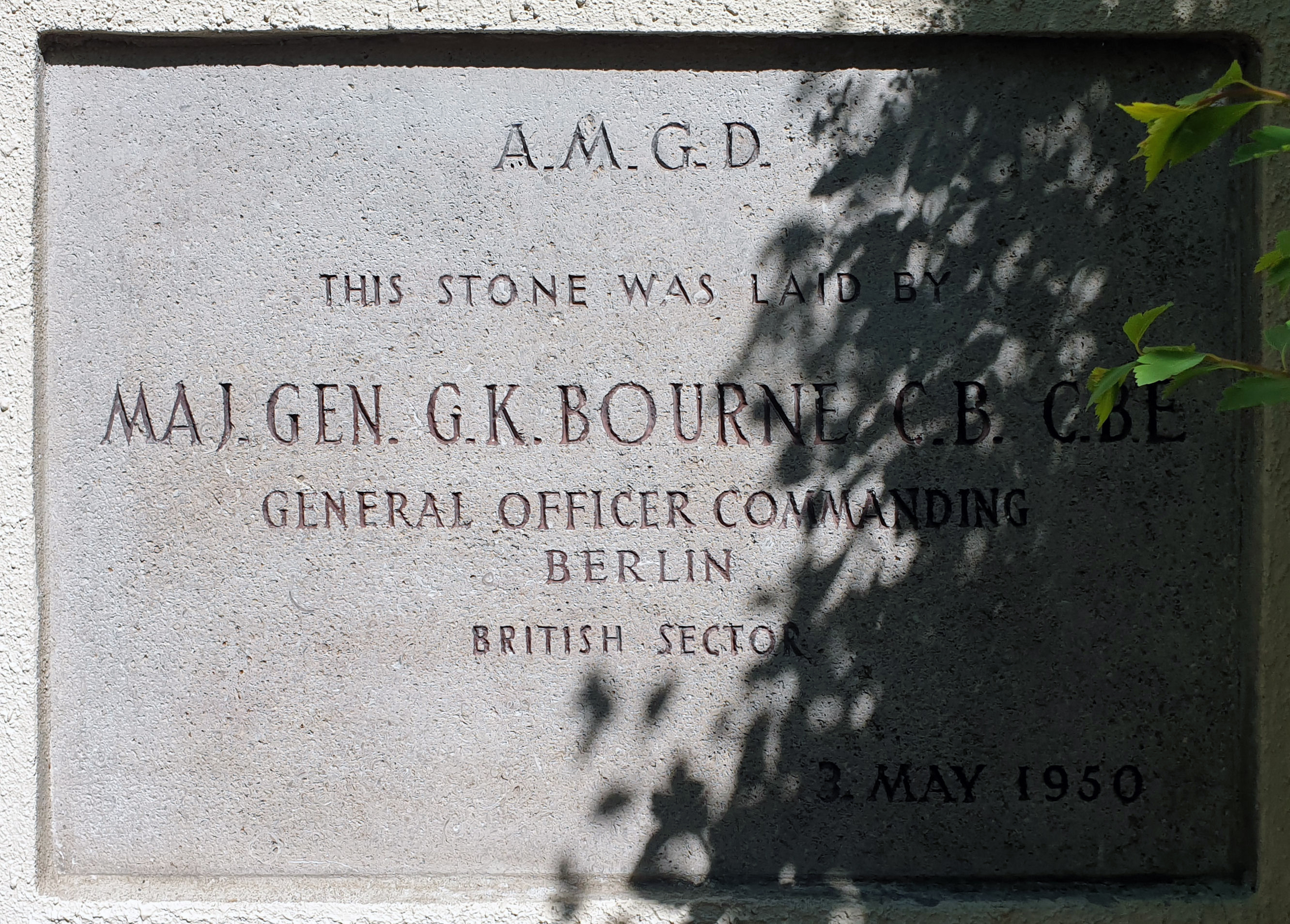
Memorial plaque in Berlin-Westend

Initially, there was a belief that the crash may have been deliberate on the part of the Soviet pilot. General Sir Brian Robertson, the British Military Governor of Germany, immediately went to see his Soviet counterpart, Marshal Vasily Sokolovsky, to protest. Sokolovsky expressed his regret at the incident and assured Robertson that it was not intentional, which Robertson appears to have believed; at any rate, he cancelled his earlier order to provide fighter protection for all British transport aircraft entering or leaving Gatow (the American authorities had issued a similar order, and they too cancelled it).

The British foreign office issued a statement that "A very serious view is taken in London of today's air crash in Berlin." Moreover, British officials felt the Soviet pilot had orders to behave in a provocative manner.

There was also some controversy as to the actions of the Soviets immediately following the crash. RAF fire engines and ambulances were sent from Gatow to the Viking crash site and, although initially allowed into the Soviet Zone, were later asked to leave. A few minutes after the crash, Soviet soldiers entered the British Zone and set up a cordon around the crashed fighter. Major-General Herbert, the British Commandant of Berlin, arrived and asked them to leave, but the officer in charge refused. A senior officer arrived later and agreed to the removal of all but a single guard, in return allowing a British guard to be placed over the wreck of the Viking.

== Enquiries ==
A British-Soviet commission of enquiry was set up on 10 April. The Soviet representative, Major-General Alexandrov, refused to hear the evidence of German or American witnesses, claiming that only British and Soviet evidence was relevant and in any case Germans were unreliable. On 13 April the British ended proceedings by saying they were unable to proceed on this basis.

Thereupon a British court of enquiry was convened by General Robertson and held in Berlin on 14–16 April. This found that the crash was accidental, that the fault in the crash was entirely that of the Soviet pilot, and that Captain John Ralph and First Officer Norman Merrington DFC of BEA were not in the slightest to blame for the crash. However, the Soviets announced that the fault was entirely that of the British aircraft, which emerged from low cloud and crashed into the fighter. The British enquiry heard that the Viking was flying at 1,500 feet (457 m), well below the cloud base of 3,000 feet (914 m).
