= Kladow =

- Quarter of Berlin
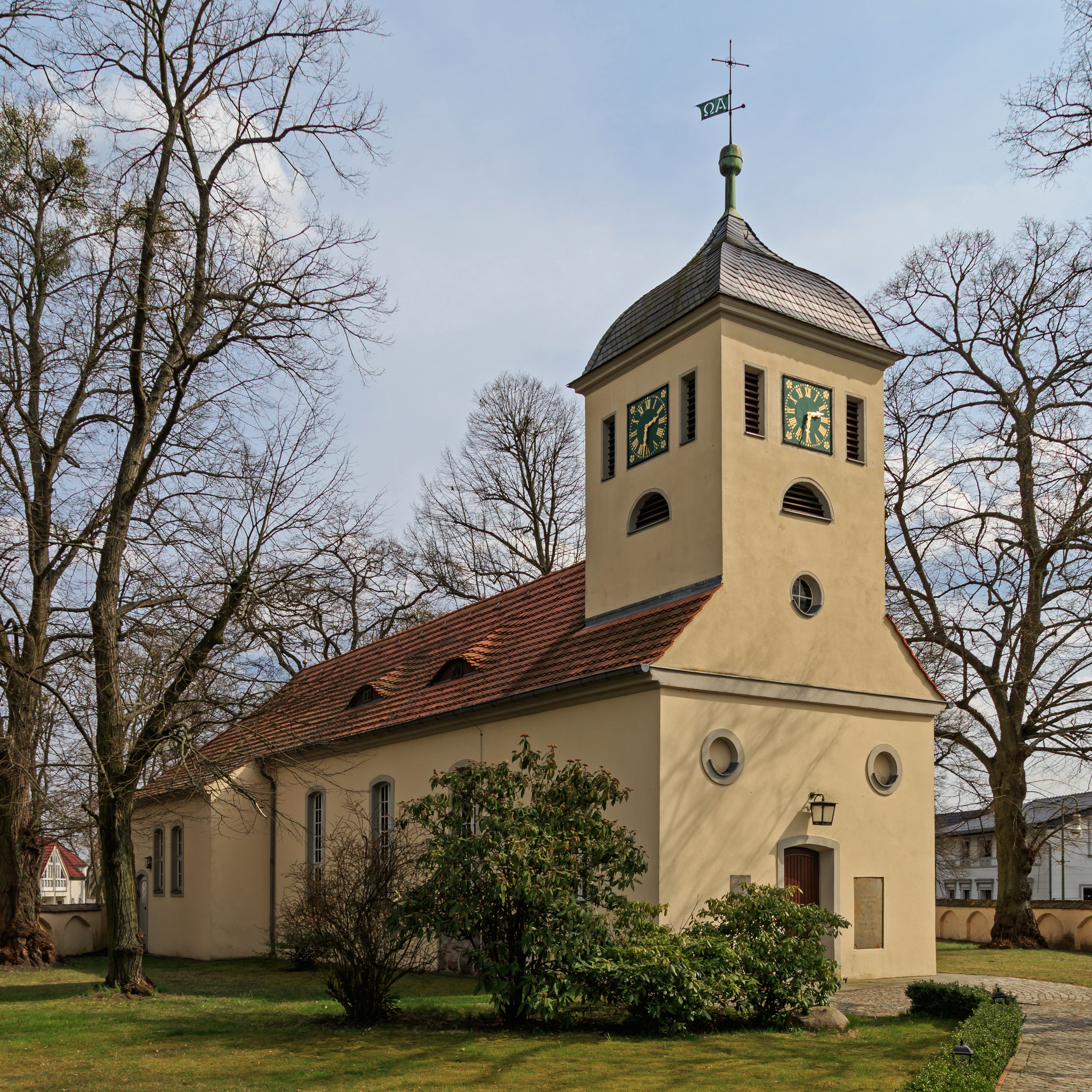
- Village church

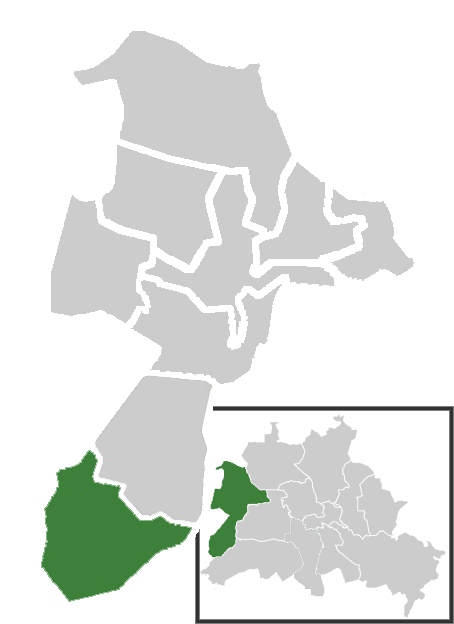
- Location of Kladow in Spandau district and Berlin
- Interactive map of Kladow
- Location within Germany Location within Berlin
- Coordinates: 52°27′11″N 13°08′34″E
- Country: Germany
- State: Berlin
- City: Berlin
- Borough: Spandau
- Founded: 1267

Area
  - Total: 14.8 km^{2} (5.7 sq mi)
- Elevation: 35 m (115 ft)

Population (2024-12-31)
  - Total: 16,548
  - Density: 1,120/km^{2} (2,900/sq mi)
- Time zone: UTC+01:00 (CET)
  - Summer (DST): UTC+02:00 (CEST)
- Postal codes: 14089
- Vehicle registration: B
- Website: Official website

Kladow (German pronunciation: [ˈklaːdoː]) is the southernmost district of the Borough of Spandau in Berlin, Germany.

== Geography ==
Located approximately 17 Km from central Berlin (Charlottenburg), the district of Kladow is bordered by the District of Gatow to the north, by the Havel to the east and southeast and by the State of Brandenburg (partly Potsdam) to the west and south west. The neighbouring village of Sacrow and main part of Groß Glienicke are located in Brandenburg. With around 11,500 residents, Kladow has managed to keep its village character, even though it is a part of the German capital.

== History ==
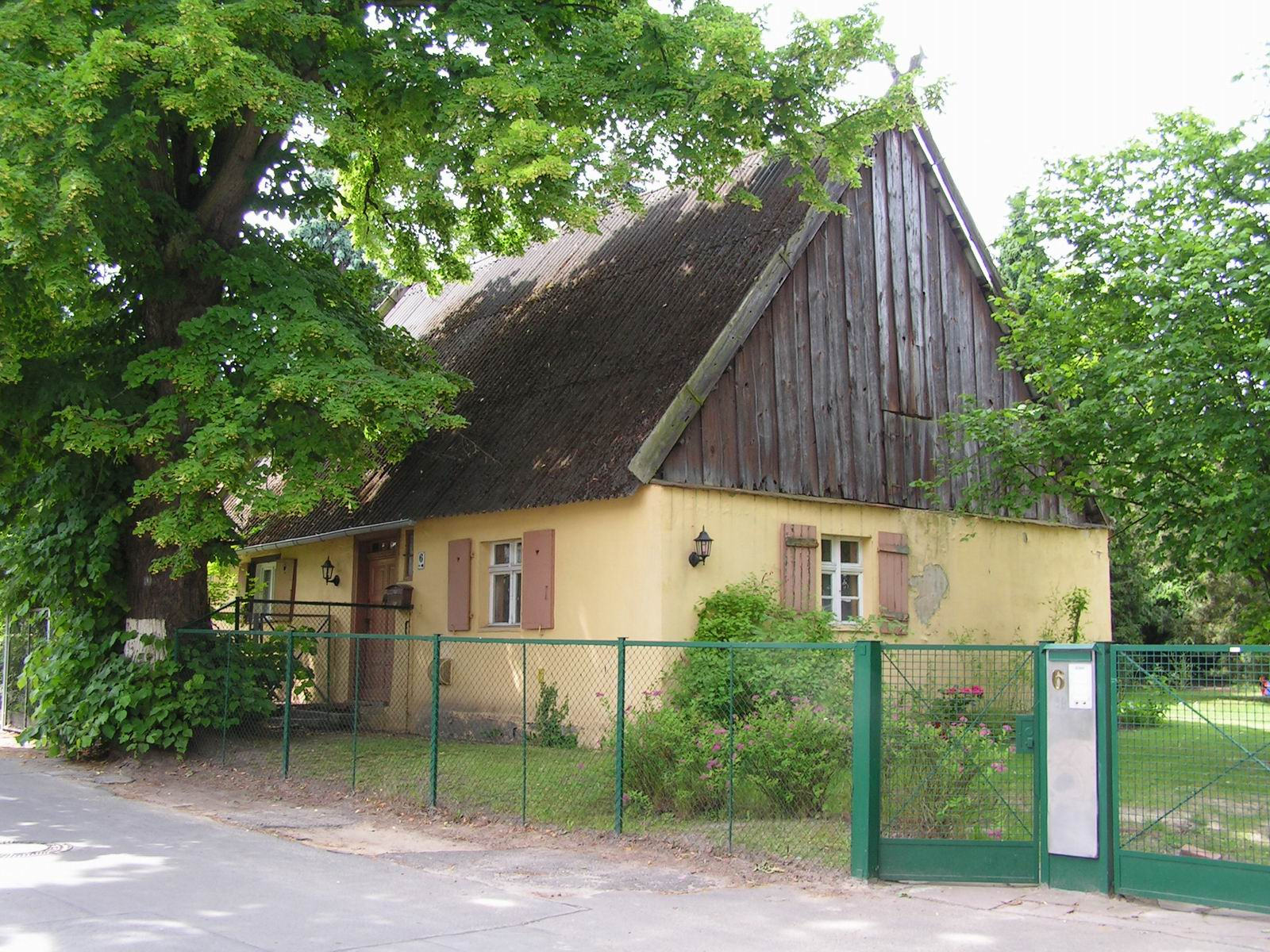
Kossätenhaus Sakrower Kirchweg 6/8

Kladow was first mentioned as Clodow in 1267, which makes it the oldest section of Spandau. Intensive settlement of what had previously been farming villages began in the early 19th century. At the border of Greater Berlin, Kladow was annexed into Spandau in 1920. Kladow has since 2003 contained part of the former airfield of RAF Gatow, which was, along with Tempelhof and Tegel, one of the three airports that made the Berlin Airlift possible.

Today, Kladow describes itself as a village in a city of millions. Buildings such as the Gut Neukladow (1800) and the Village Church (1818) date back to the 17th and 18th centuries, although there are also many new housing estates, such as the Finnenhaussiedlung erected in 1959/60. The newest housing estate in the area is the former Gatow Airport (most of which is again part of Kladow), known as the Landstadt for civil servants. With the opening of a new shopping center (The Cladow-Center), commercial activity has partially moved out from the village's center. Nevertheless, the area retains selection of stores and restaurants.

== Transportation ==
Kladow is well connected to the rest of Berlin with the Berlin Metro system. It was connected by bus as early as 1924, and it is now possible to reach the city centre in around 45 minutes using the Express Bus Line (X34). In addition, the F10 ferry travels hourly between Kladow and Wannsee.

Potsdam is around 40 minutes away by bus or by ferry to Wannsee and then S-bahn.

== Education ==
Education is provided in Kladow by a secondary school, the Hans-Carossa-Gymnasium; two primary schools, Grundschule am Ritterfeld and Mary-Poppins-Grundschule, and an independent Waldorf school, the Eugen Kolisko School.

== See also ==
- Groß Glienicker See
