= Seeburger Zipfel =

The Seeburger Zipfel (Seeburg strip), comprising Weinmeisterhöhe and part of Groß Glienicke, was a Brandenburgian salient into Greater Berlin's city boundary and as such part of a land swap between Britain and the Soviet Union regarding West Berlin. Since the major access roads to the RAF Gatow airfield ran through the territory of Seeburg, Brandenburg, which belonged to the Soviet Zone of Occupation, the British exchanged West-Staaken, part of the British Sector for the "Seeburger Zipfel" on August 30, 1945.
