= RAF Gatow =

Former air base in Berlin, Germany

RAF Gatow
- Gatow, Berlin in Germany
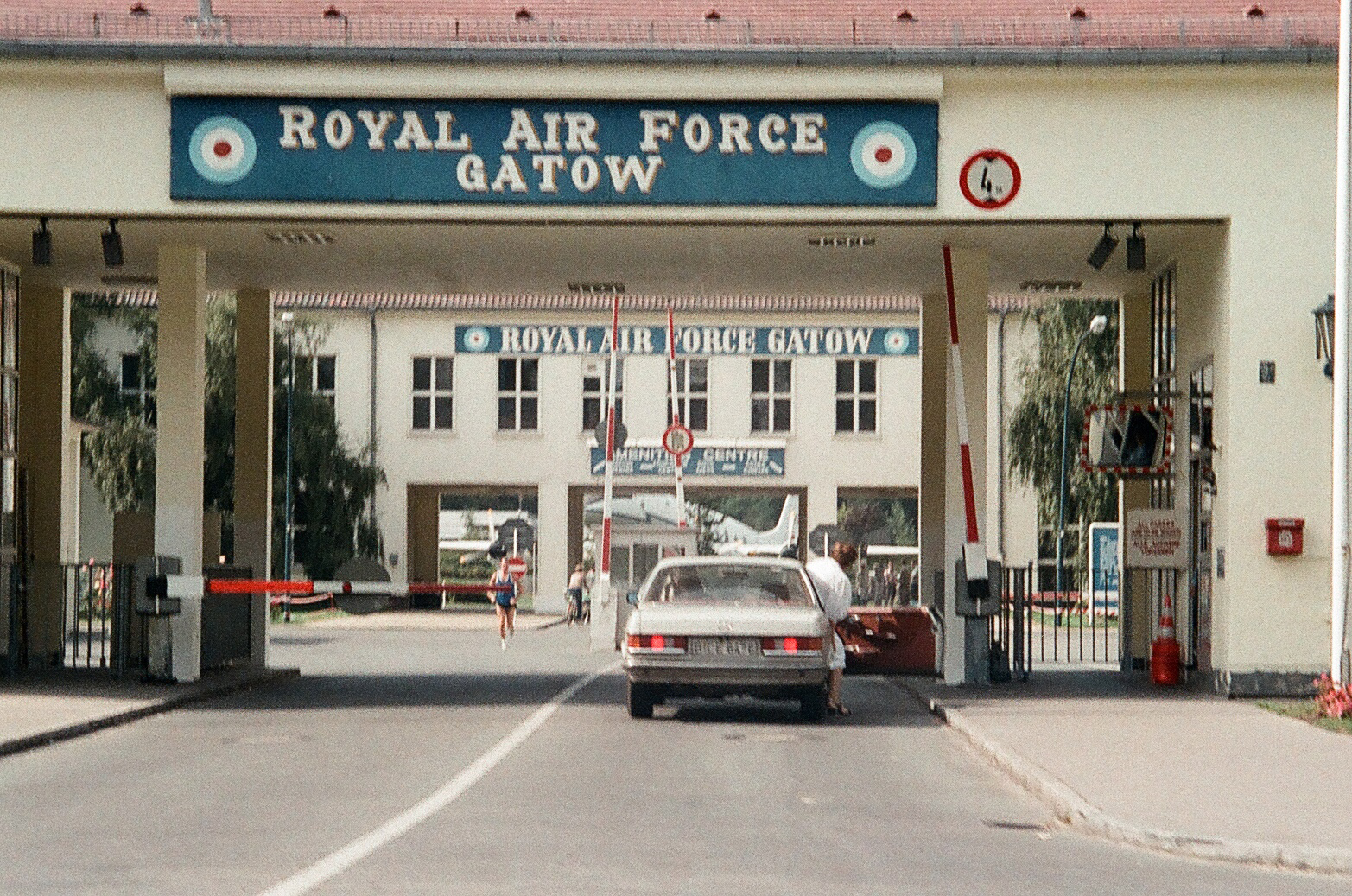
- The main gate of RAF Gatow in August 1983.

Site information
- Owner: Ministry of Defence (UK)
- Operator: Royal Air Force
- Controlled by: Royal Air Force Germany

Location
- Shown within Berlin RAF Gatow (Germany)
- Coordinates: 52°28′28″N 13°08′17″E

Site history
- Built: 1935
- In use: 1935–1995

Airfield information
- Identifiers: IATA: ~~GWW~~, ICAO: ~~EDBG~~
- Elevation: 49 metres (161 ft) AMSL
Runways
Direction	Length and surface
08R/26L	1,842 metres (6,043 ft) asphalt
08L/26R	Asphalt
- Note: Luftwaffe airfield opened by Adolf Hitler in 1935.

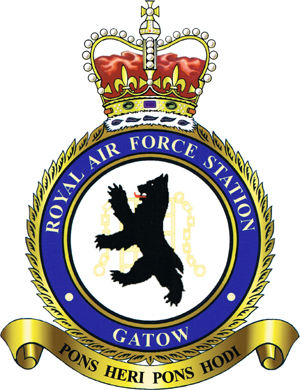
Station badge

Royal Air Force Gatow, or more commonly RAF Gatow, was a British Royal Air Force station (military airbase) in the district of Gatow in south-western Berlin, west of the Havel river, in the borough of Spandau. It was the home for the only known operational use of flying boats in central Europe, and was later used for photographic reconnaissance missions by de Havilland Canada DHC-1 Chipmunks over East Germany. Part of the former airfield is now called General Steinhoff-Kaserne, and is home to the Luftwaffenmuseum der Bundeswehr, the German Air Force Museum.

Also on the site of the former Royal Air Force station, but not part of General Steinhoff-Kaserne, is a school, the Hans-Carossa-Gymnasium, as well as houses for government employees of the Federal Republic of Germany. This part of the former airfield has since 2003 been part of the district of Berlin-Kladow.

== History ==
=== Luftwaffe use, 1934–1945 ===
The airfield was originally constructed in 1934 and 1935 by the Luftwaffe as a staff and technical college, Luftkriegsschule 2 Berlin-Gatow, in imitation of the Royal Air Force College at RAF Cranwell. The initial personnel came partially from the Naval Academy Mürwik. Opened on 1 April 1936, the air force college was renamed Luftkriegsschule 2 on 15 January 1940. Its satellite airfields were Güterfelde and Reinsdorf. Airborne flying training ended in October 1944, due to fuel shortages. From 5 March 1945, aircrew officer cadets were retrained as paratroops, for ground operations which had very high casualties.

Clues to the airfield's original use survive in the barrack block accommodation, each block of which was named after a famous German airman of the First World War, with the airman's bust above the entrance door. The architect was Ernst Sagebiel, an architect who worked full-time for the Luftwaffe and also designed Tempelhof Airport. Other surviving features during the entire period of the airfield's use as RAF Gatow (1945–1994) included light bulbs in the main hangars, many of which dated from the 1930s.

=== Royal Air Force and Army Air Corps use ===
==== 1945–1948 ====
Late April 1945, towards the end of the Second World War in Europe, the airfield was occupied by the advancing Red Army. Following the division of Berlin into four sectors, Soviet forces relinquished part of the airfield and access roads, the so-called Seeburger Zipfel to the British after the Potsdam Conference in exchange for West-Staaken on 30 August 1945. Earlier on 25 June 1945, 284 Field Squadron, RAF Regiment, arrived at Gatow by land via Magdeburg. Their reception by Soviet troops was extremely hostile, the Soviets attempting to confine 284 Field Squadron behind barbed wire fences, as the Squadron was said to have arrived "too early". This set the pattern for relations, with Soviet checkpoints being set up beside the airfield manned by fully armed and unfriendly troops. RAF Regiment officers occasionally surveyed Soviet positions by air from Avro Ansons, and the tour of duty of RAF Regiment detachments at Gatow was limited to six months, because of the constant activity occasioned by the Soviet presence and the Berlin Airlift.

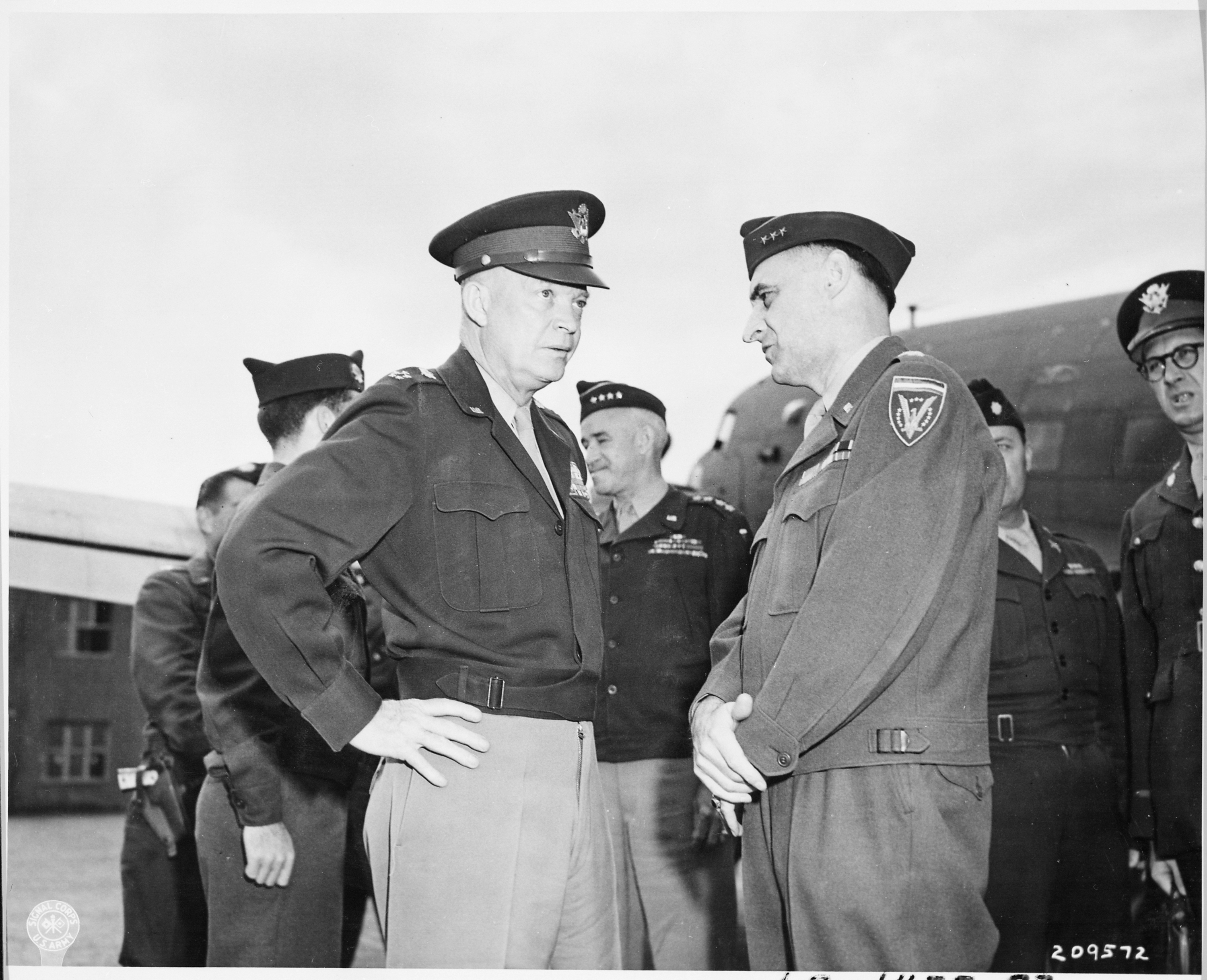
U.S. Army Generals Dwight D. Eisenhower and Lucius D. Clay at RAF Gatow during the Potsdam Conference in 1945

The first landing by a Royal Air Force aircraft was by Avro Anson serial number PW698 on 2 July 1945 at 11.55 hours. Initially, Gatow was called Intermediate Landing Place No. 19, but on 19 August 1945 was renamed Royal Air Force Gatow, or RAF Gatow for short. The Station was given the Latin motto Pons Heri Pons Hodie, which may be translated as A bridge yesterday, a bridge today.

Among the aircrew who flew in to RAF Gatow was the then RAF Navigator Errol Barrow. During his distinguished RAF career, Barrow was posted to the personal flight of the Commander-in-Chief of the British occupation zone in Germany, Sir Sholto Douglas, as his Navigator. Douglas and Barrow became friends, and Douglas made Barrow Godfather to his only child. Barrow went on to be instrumental in achieving Barbados' independence and was the first and third Prime Minister of Barbados.

RAF Gatow was also used as a civilian airport for a limited time. In 1946, British European Airways (BEA) inaugurated an RAF Northolt – Hamburg – Gatow scheduled service at a frequency of six flights a week, using Douglas DC-3 ("Pionair" in BEA terminology) and Vickers VC.1 Viking piston-engined aircraft.

==== Berlin Airlift, 1948–1949 ====
The Station was modernised with a 2,000 yards (1,800 m) long concrete runway, using 794 German workers, in March 1947. Along with the American airfield of Tempelhof and the French airfield of Tegel, RAF Gatow played a key role in the Berlin airlift of 1948. Initially, about 150 Douglas Dakotas and 40 Avro Yorks were used to fly supplies into Gatow. By 18 July 1948, the RAF was flying 995 tons of supplies per day into the airfield.

Alongside the Royal Air Force and various British civil aviation companies, the United States Air Force, the Royal Australian Air Force (RAAF), the Royal Canadian Air Force (RCAF), the Royal New Zealand Air Force (RNZAF) and the South African Air Force all flew supplies into RAF Gatow during the Airlift.

On 20 June 1980, the Royal Australian Air Force presented a Douglas Dakota to RAF Gatow in commemoration of its role. Its aircrew included Air Marshal David Evans, an Australian airlift veteran. As only British, French and American aircraft were allowed under international law to fly inside the Allied Air Corridors, the Dakota received the RAF serial number ZD215. The Dakota is still at Gatow, inside the German Air Force barracks.

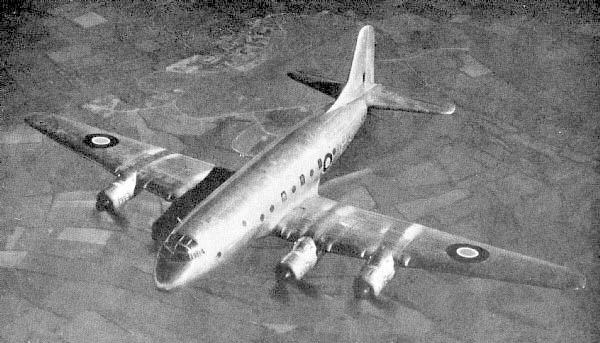
An RAF Handley Page Hastings

In November 1948, the latest RAF transport aircraft, the Handley Page Hastings, was added to the squadrons flying into RAF Gatow and some aircrews and aircraft were redeployed to train replacement aircrews. Many of these were based at RAF Schleswigland, near Jagel, which is currently used by the German Air Force and the Marineflieger. A Hastings aircraft, which served on the airlift and was later RAF Gatow's 'gate guardian' until the station's closure, is now preserved in the Alliierten Museum. By mid-December, the RAF had landed 100,000 tons of supplies. In April 1949, commercial airline companies involved in the airlift were formed into a Civil Airlift Division (co-ordinated by British European Airways) to operate under RAF control. Apart from BEA itself, these included a number of Britain's fledgling independent airlines as well, such as the late Sir Freddie Laker's Air Charter, Harold Bamberg's Eagle Aviation and Skyways. By mid-April, the combined airlift of all nations' operations managed to make 1,398 flights in 24 hours, carrying 12,940 tons (13,160 t) of goods, coal and machinery, beating their record of 8,246 (8,385 t) set only days earlier.

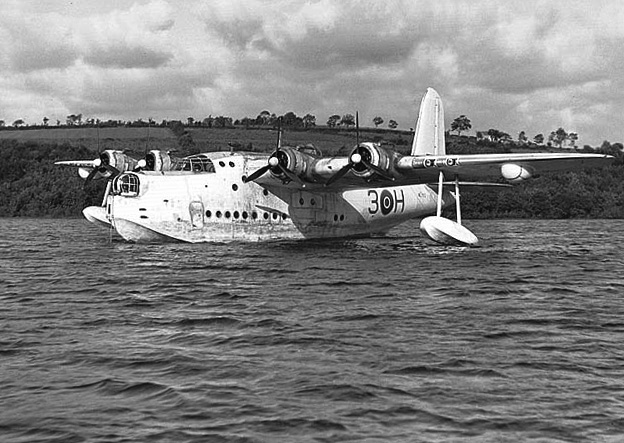
A Short Sunderland similar to those used during the Berlin Airlift

RAF Gatow has the unique and unlikely distinction of being the base for the only known operational use of flying boats in central Europe, during the Berlin Blockade, on the nearby Wannsee, a lake in the Havel river. On 6 July 1948, the RAF began using 10 Short Sunderland and 2 Short Hythe flying boats, flying from Finkenwerder on the Elbe near Hamburg to Berlin. These were supplemented by the flying boat operations of Aquila Airways, an early post-war British independent airline that became an operating division of British Aviation Services. The flying boats' specialty was transporting bulk salt, which would have been very corrosive to other aircraft, but was not as corrosive to the flying boats because of their anodised skins.

The novel Air Bridge by Hammond Innes is partially set in RAF Gatow at the time of the Berlin Airlift, and is notable for its accurate descriptions of the Station, including corridors and rooms within it. Some of the descriptions were still accurate some 40 years after the book's publication.

==== 1949–1994 ====
After the Berlin Blockade, RAF Gatow served as an airfield for the British Army's Berlin Infantry Brigade, and was prepared to revert to its role as a supply base, if another Berlin Airlift to West Berlin ever became necessary.

BEA moved to Tempelhof Airport in 1951, where most of West Berlin's commercial air transport operations were concentrated from then on. Gatow's non-military use after 1950 included several official visits by Queen Elizabeth and other members of the British royal family, which frequently took place over the years. The airport also handled trooping flights operated by British independent airlines such as British United Airways, Britannia Airways and Autair/Court Line under contract to the MoD.

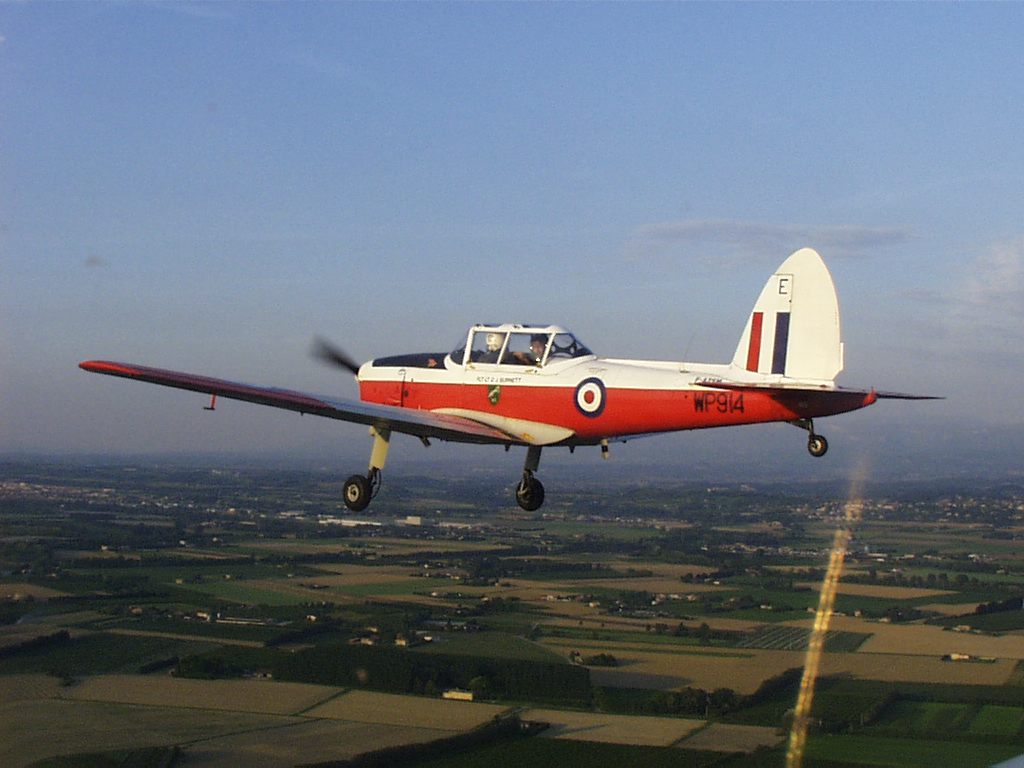
A De Havilland Chipmunk T10

The RAF Gatow Station Flight used two de Havilland Canada DHC-1 Chipmunk T.10s, one of which is now owned by the Alliiertenmuseum, to maintain and exercise the British legal right under the Potsdam Agreement to use the airspace over both West and East Berlin, as well as the air corridors to and from West Germany to the city.

In the 1950s the base was also an important centre for intelligence gathering by Royal Air Force Linguists monitoring on a 24/7 basis Soviet air traffic broadcasts from its bases all over Eastern Europe.

These aircraft were also used for reconnaissance missions in co-operation with The British Commander-in-Chief's Mission to the Soviet Forces of Occupation in Germany, commonly known as BRIXMIS. Known from 1956 as Operation Schooner and then Operation Nylon, they were authorised, at the highest level, on an irregular basis to carry out covert photographic reconnaissance flights. All flights had to be notified to the Berlin Air Safety Center (BASC), a quadripartite organisation responsible for authorising all flights in the three Air Corridors and the Berlin Control Zone (BCZ). All the Chipmunk Flight Notification Cards in the BASC were stamped by the Soviets "Safety of Flight Not Guaranteed" due to their interpretation of the 1946 Agreement as excluding flights outside West Berlin. Within the BCZ were many Soviet and East German military airfields and other installations.

After the fall of the Berlin Wall, Chipmunk reconnaissance flights soon ceased and the two Chipmunks were flown to RAF Laarbruch, in Western Germany to await disposal action. Chipmunk WG466 was flown back to Berlin Tempelhof from RAF Laarbruch on 30 July 1994 and was donated to the Alliiertenmuseum in Berlin. It is currently on loan to the Luftwaffenmuseum der Bundeswehr at Gatow, WG486 is still in RAF service with the Battle of Britain Memorial Flight.

RAF Gatow was from 1970 also used by the UK's Army Air Corps, 7 Aviation Flight AAC, later renamed No. 7 Flight AAC being based at the station initially flying four Westland Sioux (UK-built Bell 47) and later three Westland Gazelle AH.1 helicopters. A Signals Unit (26SU) was also based at RAF Gatow and on the Teufelsberg in the Grunewald. 26SU was a specialist Signals Intelligence unit operated by the RAF on behalf of GCHQ Cheltenham tasked with monitoring Warsaw Pact military communications over East Germany and Poland.

==== Escapes to Gatow from East Germany ====
At least three successful escapes were made from East Germany to RAF Gatow.

On 9 April 1978 the two East German brothers Lothar and Dieter Weber defected by flying a Zlin Z-42M light aircraft of the Gesellschaft für Sport und Technik (GST – an East German paramilitary training organisation) with the call sign DM-WNX to RAF Gatow. The escape had been planned over the previous three years. The aircraft was dismantled and returned to East Germany over the Glienicker Brücke with painted slogans such as "Wish you were here".

On 24 June 1979 an East German glider landed at RAF Gatow, its pilot seeking political asylum. The glider was handed back to East Germany at the Glienicke Bridge four days later. The flying control surface lock for the rudder bore the message "remove before the next escape".

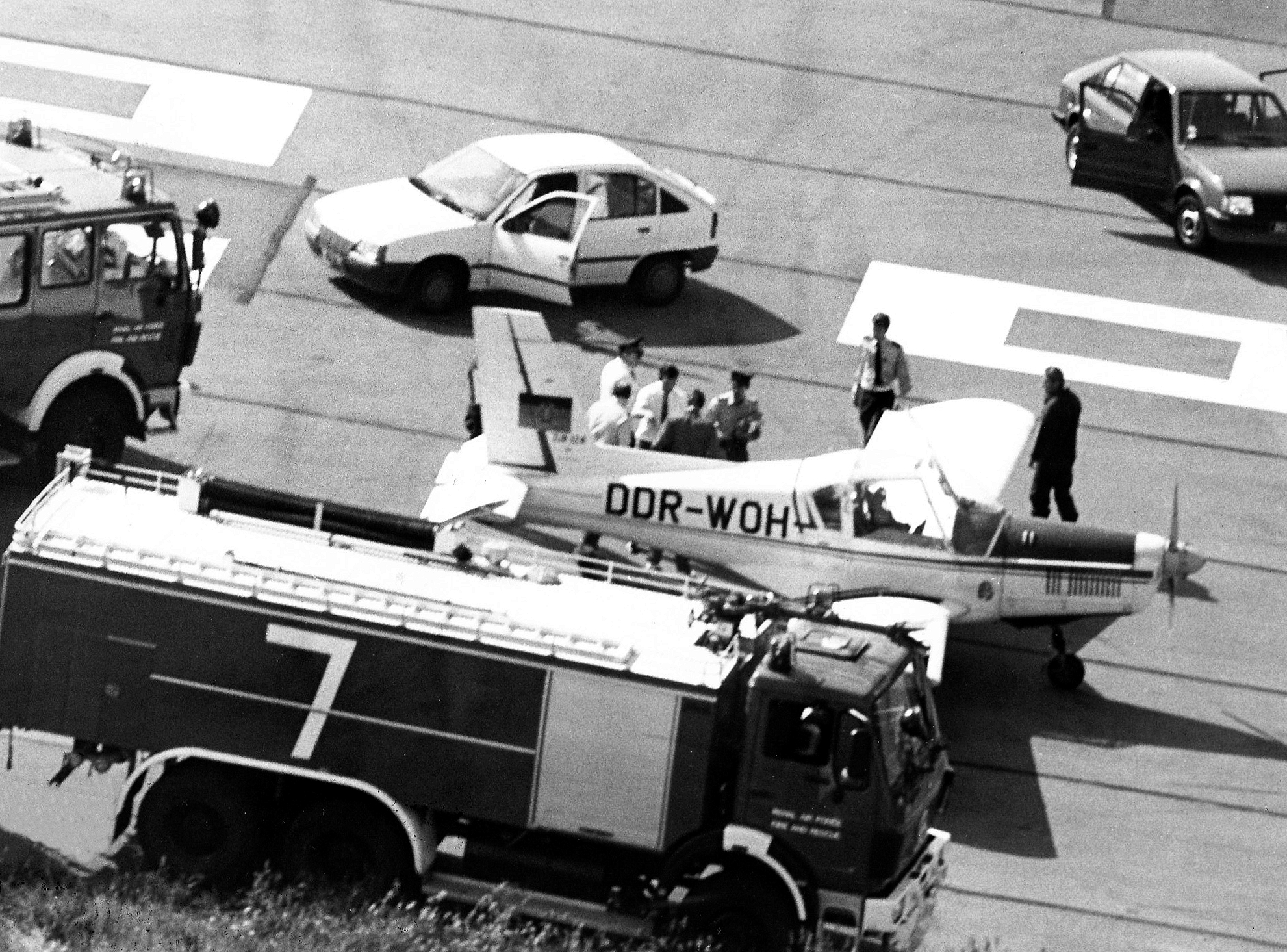
Zlin Z-42M DDR-WOH shortly after landing at RAF Gatow Jul 1987

On 15 July 1987, a young East German, Thomas Krüger, defected by flying a Zlin Z-42M light aircraft of the Gesellschaft für Sport und Technik. His first words to the RAF Police were a request for political asylum. He was handed over to the civil authorities and received West German citizenship. His aircraft, registration DDR-WOH, was dismantled and returned to the East Germans (by road) by RAF station flight personnel, complete with humorous slogans painted on by RAF airmen such as "Wish you were here", "Come back soon". DDR-WOH is still flying today, but since 1991 under registration D-EWOH.

==== East German invasion plans ====
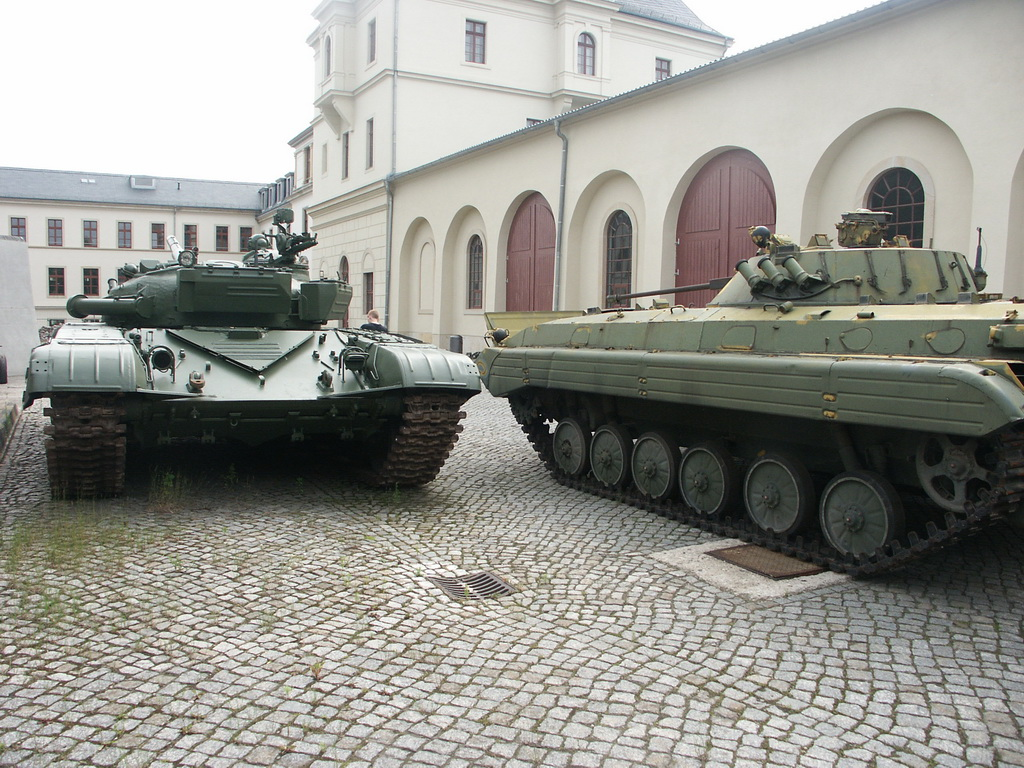
An NVA tank and armoured personnel carrier

The closest military neighbour to RAF Gatow was a tank unit of the National People's Army (NVA) of East Germany. This was located immediately opposite the airfield, behind the section of the Berlin Wall which ran along the western side of the airfield, and was clearly visible from RAF Gatow's control tower. The Berlin Wall section opposite Gatow was not in fact a wall, but a wire fence. East Germany claimed that this was a "military courtesy", but nobody at RAF Gatow believed this, thinking that it was instead intended to make a military invasion easier. This surmise was confirmed after the reunification of Germany, when the East German invasion plans for West Berlin, codenamed "Operation CENTRE" were found. Grenzregiment 34 "Hanno Günther" of the Grenztruppen der DDR was allocated the task of attacking and occupying RAF Gatow. The invasion plans were continually updated, even in 1990 when it was clear that East Germany would soon cease to exist.

== Closure ==
Following the reunification of Germany, the British ceded control of the station on 18 June 1994. The Station Flight and its two Chipmunk T.10s was disbanded on 30 June 1994. The station was handed back to the German Air Force on 7 September 1994.

The airfield was kept operational for a very short time, and then closed to air traffic in 1995. The western end of the two runways was later removed to make way for housing, leaving only the eastern portions, cut mid-field on a diagonal line. The remaining portions are used for the outdoor aircraft display.

The history of RAF Gatow and of western forces in Berlin from 1945 to 1994 is told in the Allied Museum.

== 1989 RAF Garrison ==
Below is the RAF's garrison of the station in 1989:

- RAF Gatow Headquarters
- Gatow Station Service Squadron
- RAF Gatow Station Flight
- Air Traffic Control
- Catering Squadron
- Security Squadron
- No. 26 Signals Unit RAF
- Berlin Detachment RAF Provost & Security Services (Germany)
- Royal Engineers Special Project Team (This was an ad hoc unit created to work on OP FRESH AIR based in Hanger 7 from 1987 to 1991)

== Current use by the German Air Force and the Hans-Carossa-Gymnasium ==
The airfield is now called General-Steinhoff Kaserne. Units now based there are Bw Fachschule Berlin-Gatow, Fernmeldeaufklärungsabschnitt 921, Luftwaffenunterstützungskompanie Gatow, Kommando 3 Luftwaffendivision, Luftwaffenmusikkorps 4 and Truppenambulanz Berlin-Gatow.

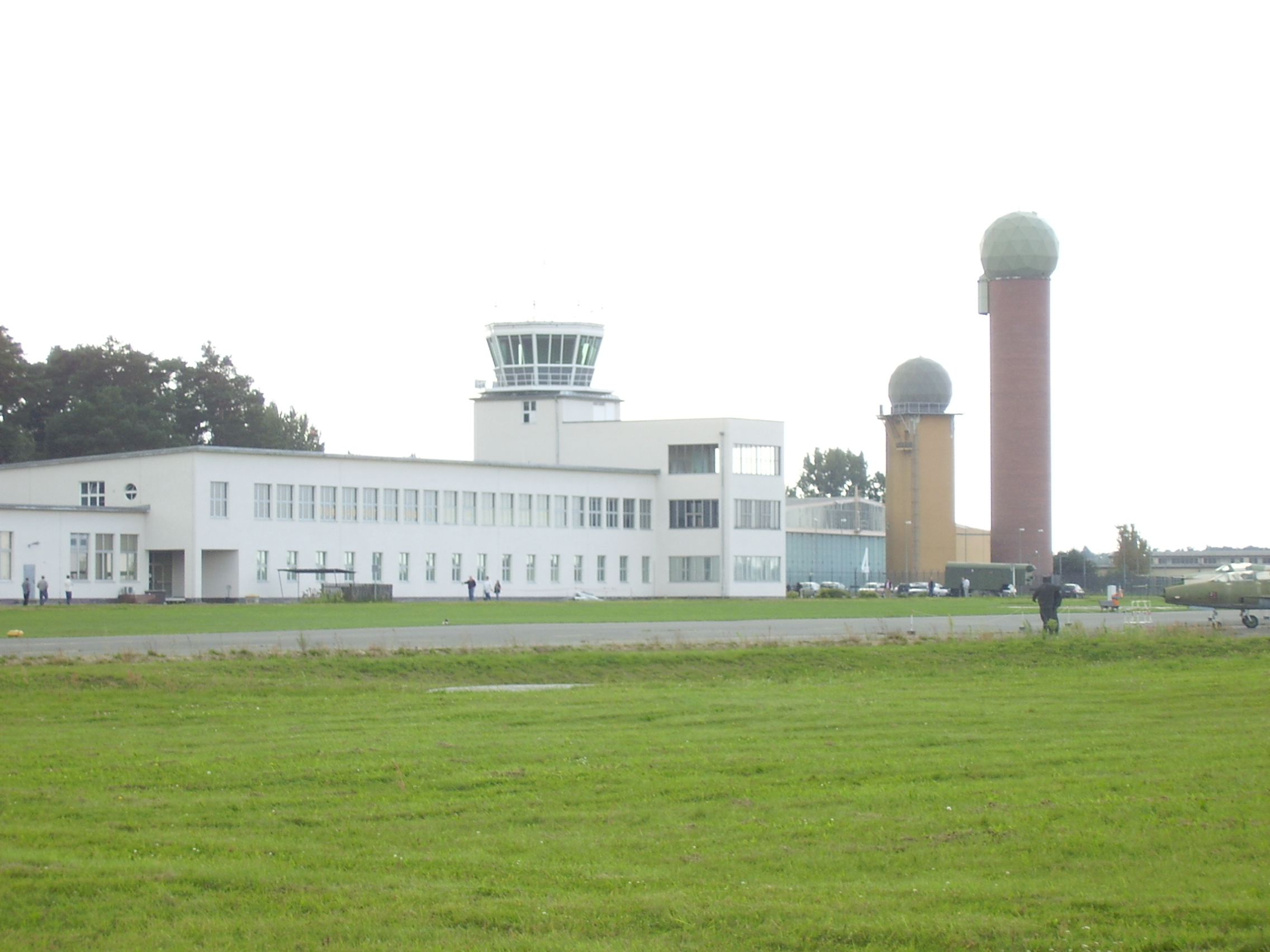
Gatow today.

Also on the site of the former RAF station, but not part of General-Steinhoff Kaserne, is a school, the Hans-Carossa-Gymnasium, and houses for government employees of the Federal Republic of Germany. Since 2003, this has been part of the district of Berlin-Kladow.

The General-Steinhoff Kaserne is also home to the Luftwaffenmuseum der Bundeswehr, the museum of the Air Force which has many displays (including historic aircraft) and much information on German military aviation and the history of the airfield. Admission to the museum is free. The museum, which is run by the German Air Force, is under the technical and administrative chain of command of the Militärgeschichtliches Forschungsamt or MGFA (Military History Research Institute).

== Accidents and incidents ==
- On 18 March 1947, a Hawker Tempest II (PR853) belonging to No. 16 Squadron RAF (piloted by W/O Angus Mackay) crash landed at Berlin-Kladow less than a mile away from RAF Gatow. The pilot survived.
- On 5 April 1948, a BEA Vickers 610 Viking 1B (registration: G-AIVP) operating that day's scheduled flight from Northolt via Hamburg to Berlin collided during its approach to RAF Gatow head-on with a Soviet Air Force Yakovlev 3 fighter, which was performing aerobatics in the area at that time. As a result of the collision, the Viking spiralled out of control and crashed 1.9 miles from the airport on East German territory with the loss of all 14 lives (four crew, ten passengers) on board the aircraft. The Soviet fighter pilot was killed in the accident as well. The subsequent investigation established the Soviet fighter pilot's action, which contravened all accepted rules of flying and the quadripartite flying rules to which Soviet authorities were parties, as the cause of the accident.
- On 15 March 1949, a Skyways Avro 685 York I freighter (registration: G-AHFI) crashed on approach to RAF Gatow, as a result of losing its port wing. This caused the aircraft to dive into the ground, killing all three crew members.

== See also ==
- West Berlin
- Berlin Airlift
- Berlin Wall
- Ernst Sagebiel

== Bibliography ==
- Durie, William (2012). The British Garrison Berlin 1945 - 1994: nowhere to go ... a pictorial historiography of the British Military occupation / presence in Berlin. Berlin: Vergangenheitsverlag (de). ISBN 978-3-86408-068-5. OCLC 978161722.
- Kevin Wright and Peter Jefferies "Looking down the corridors-Allied aerial espionage over East Germany and Berlin 1945–1990",2015, ISBN 978-0-7509-7947-4.
