= Heiliger See =

Lake in Potsdam, Brandenburg, Germany

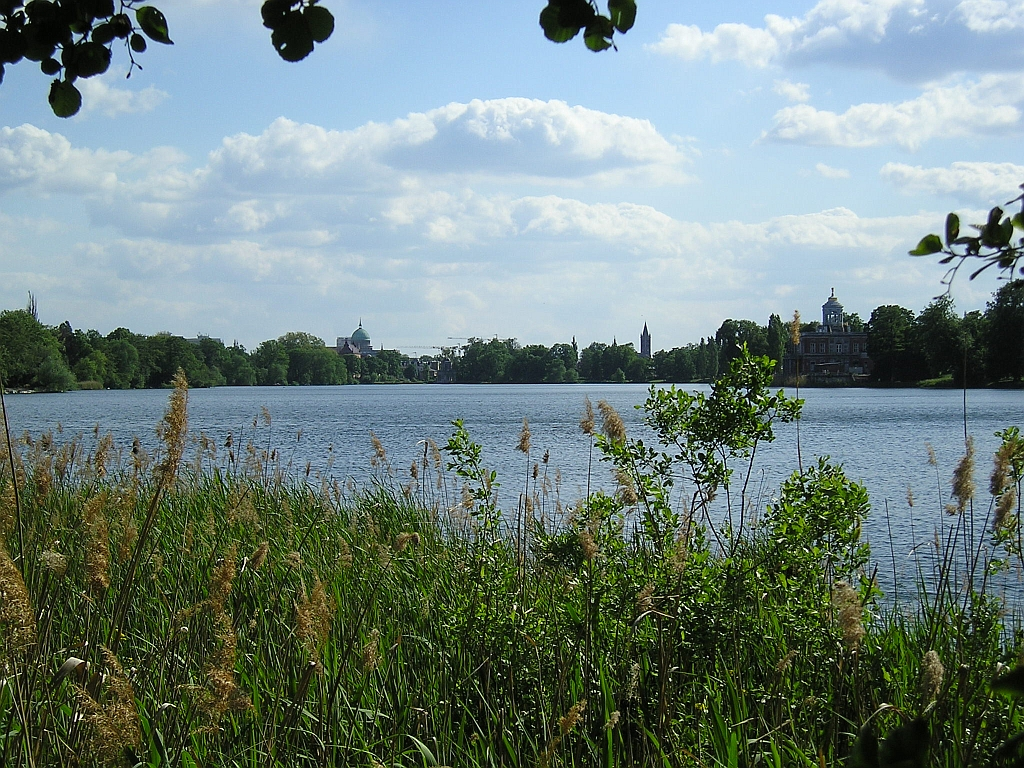

- Location within Brandenburg
- Location: Potsdam, Brandenburg
- Coordinates: 52°24′43″N 13°4′16″E
- Primary outflows: Hasengraben
- Basin countries: Germany
- Surface area: 0.34 km^{2} (0.13 sq mi)
- Max. depth: ca. 11 m (36 ft)
- Shore length^{1}: 3.4 km (2.1 mi)
- Surface elevation: 29.4 m (96 ft)
- ^{1} Shore length is not a well-defined measure.

Heiliger See (English: Holy Lake) is a lake within the city limits of Potsdam, Brandenburg, Germany, located northeast of the city center and bordering the historic park known as the New Garden. Together with the lakes Sacrower See and Groß Glienicker See to the north it forms a chain of lakes resulting from a glacial tunnel valley. The lake is 1.5 km long and 300 metres wide on average.

Because of its picturesque location amidst the historic parks and palaces of Potsdam, with the Marmorpalais on its west shore and Cecilienhof near the north shore, the lake is a popular goal for excursions and has an attractive residential area on its eastern shore.

There are numerous unofficial bathing and relaxation points along the banks, specifically nudist sunbathers cluster along the north shore in several small meadows formed by gaps in the trees.

It has a connection to Lake Jungfernsee and thus to the Havel River's extensive network of waterways via the Hasengraben, a short canal where the water is kept dammed up to maintain a high water level for the lake. This is done to keep the wooden piles on which the Marmorpalais is built from being exposed to the air and drying out.

The lake suffers from an overload of biomass, especially from falling leaves which are decomposed by bacteria on the shallow bottom, depleting the lake of oxygen in the process. In summertime the depths can be virtually without oxygen, causing dead ecological zones.

Despite this, divers have encountered certain fishes whilst diving, such as pike, eels, perch, and the common rudd, in the period of time between May and September.

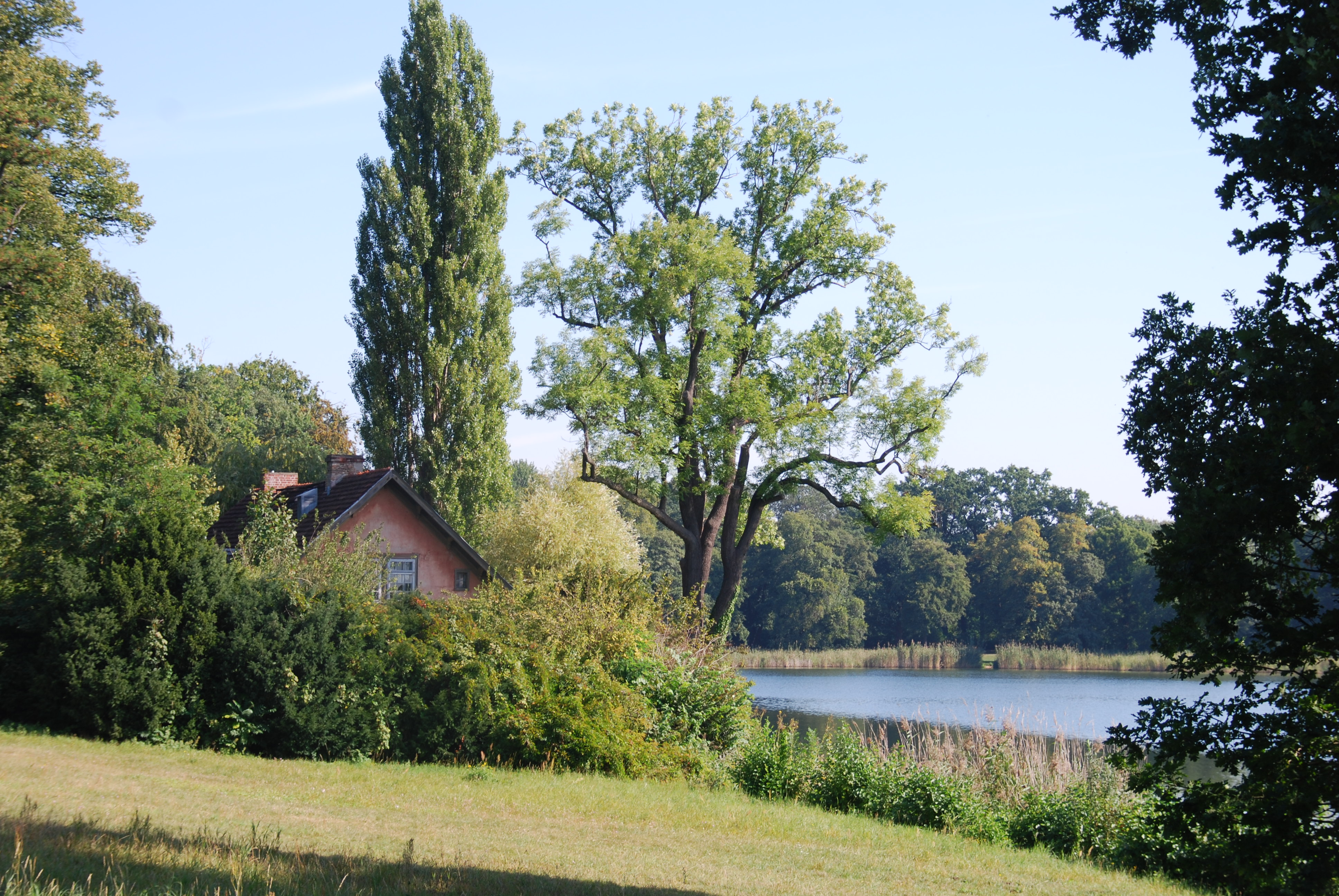
Heiliger See, with the so-called “Red House” on the left

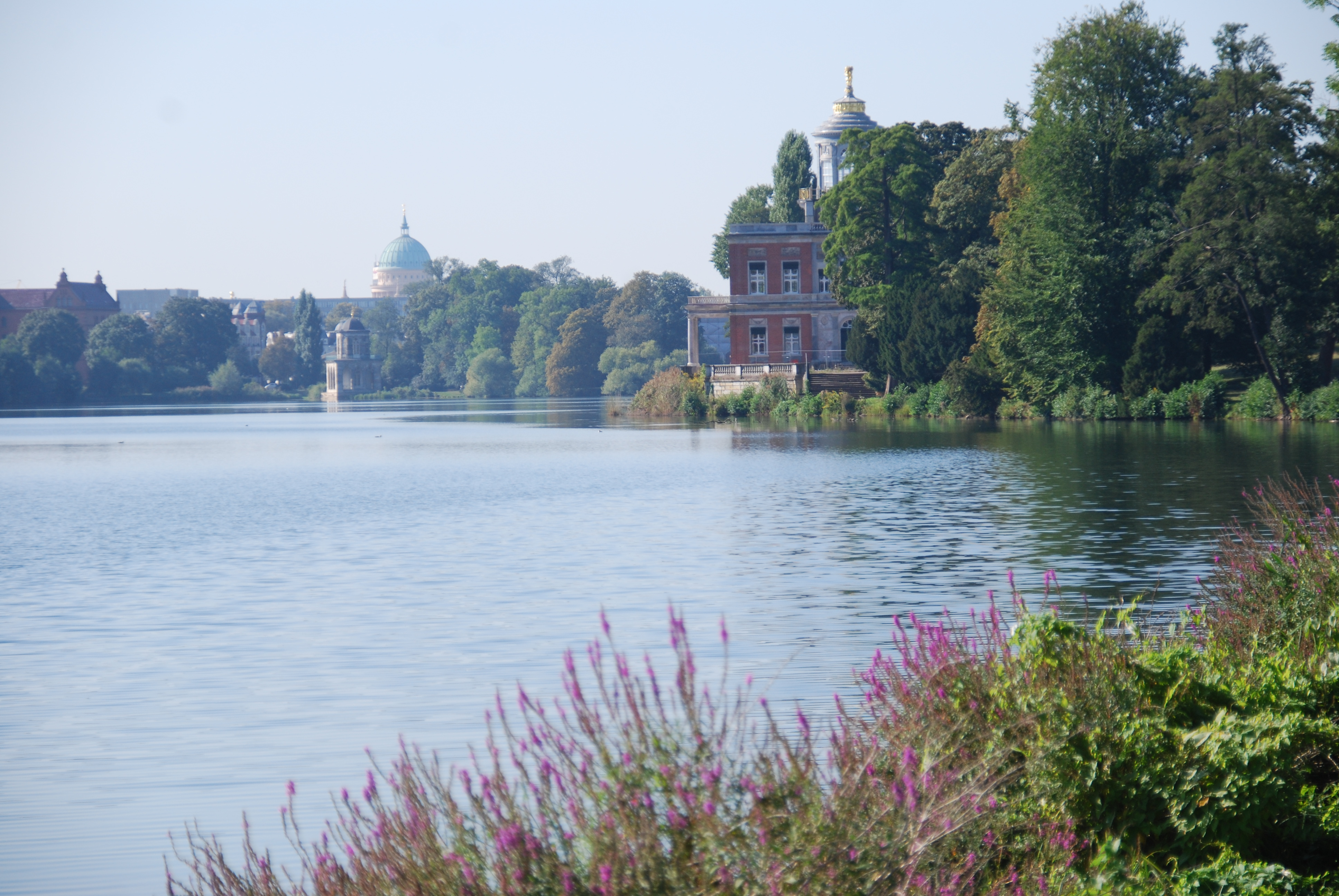
Heiliger See, with the Marmorpalais in the center-right background

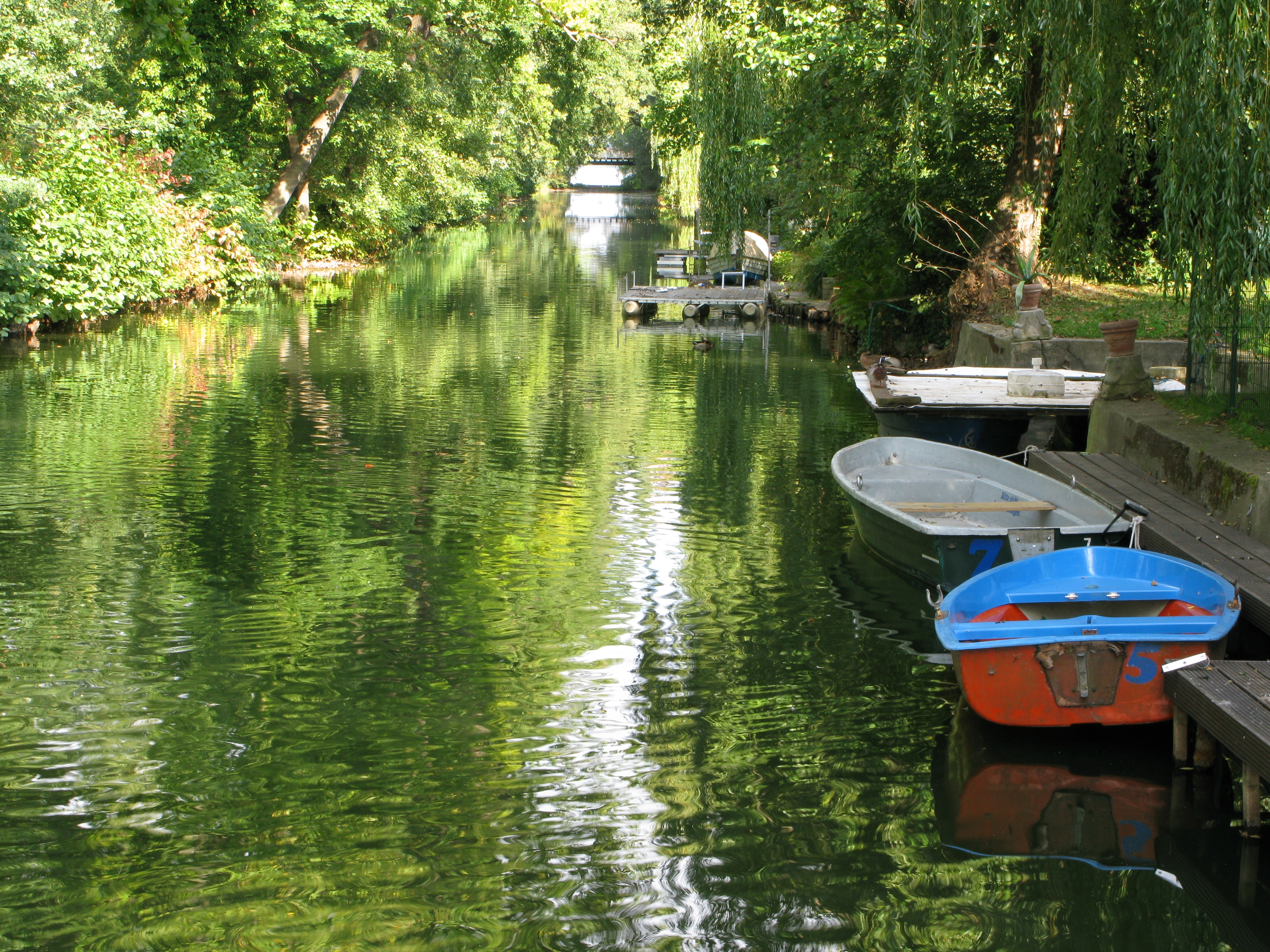
The Hasengraben lake outlet

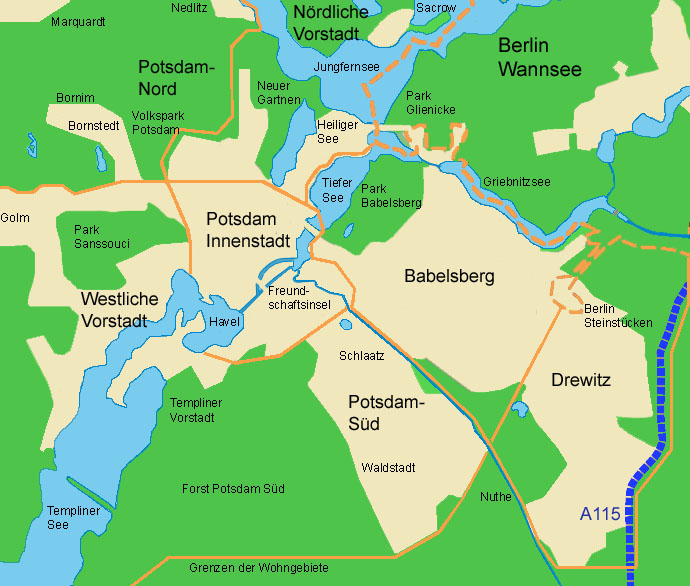
The Heiliger See is to the north between Neuer Garten and Tiefer See.

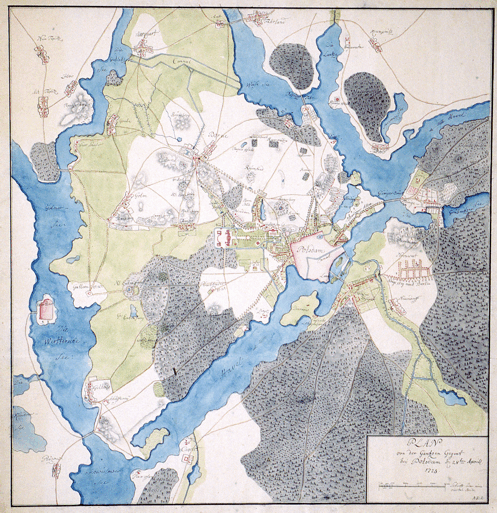
Historical map from 1773 showing the Heiliger See (in the upper right quarter) in the context of the Potsdam waterways.
