= Groß Glienicke =

Village in Brandenburg, Germany

Coordinates: 52°28′N 13°07′E

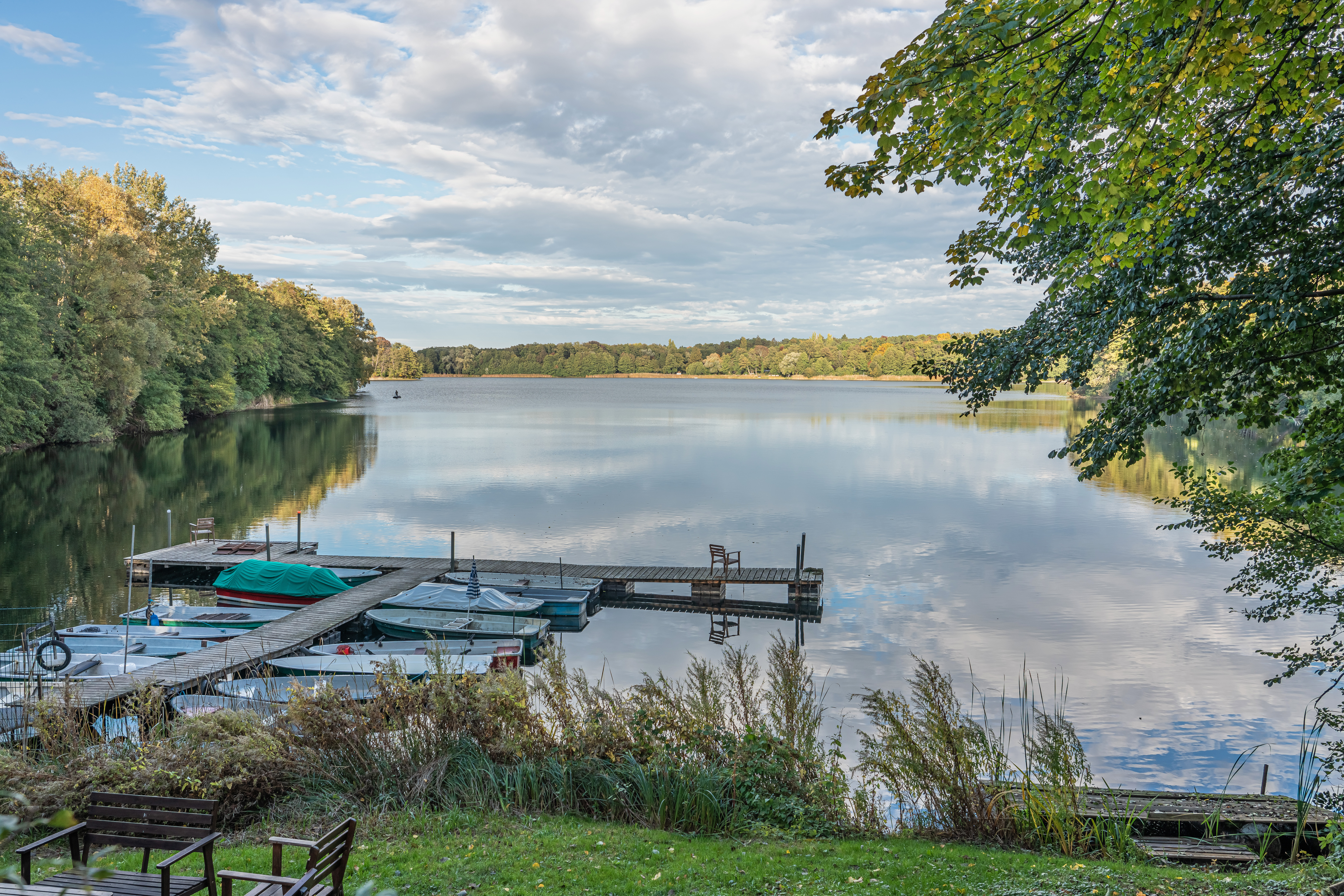
The Groß Glienicker See

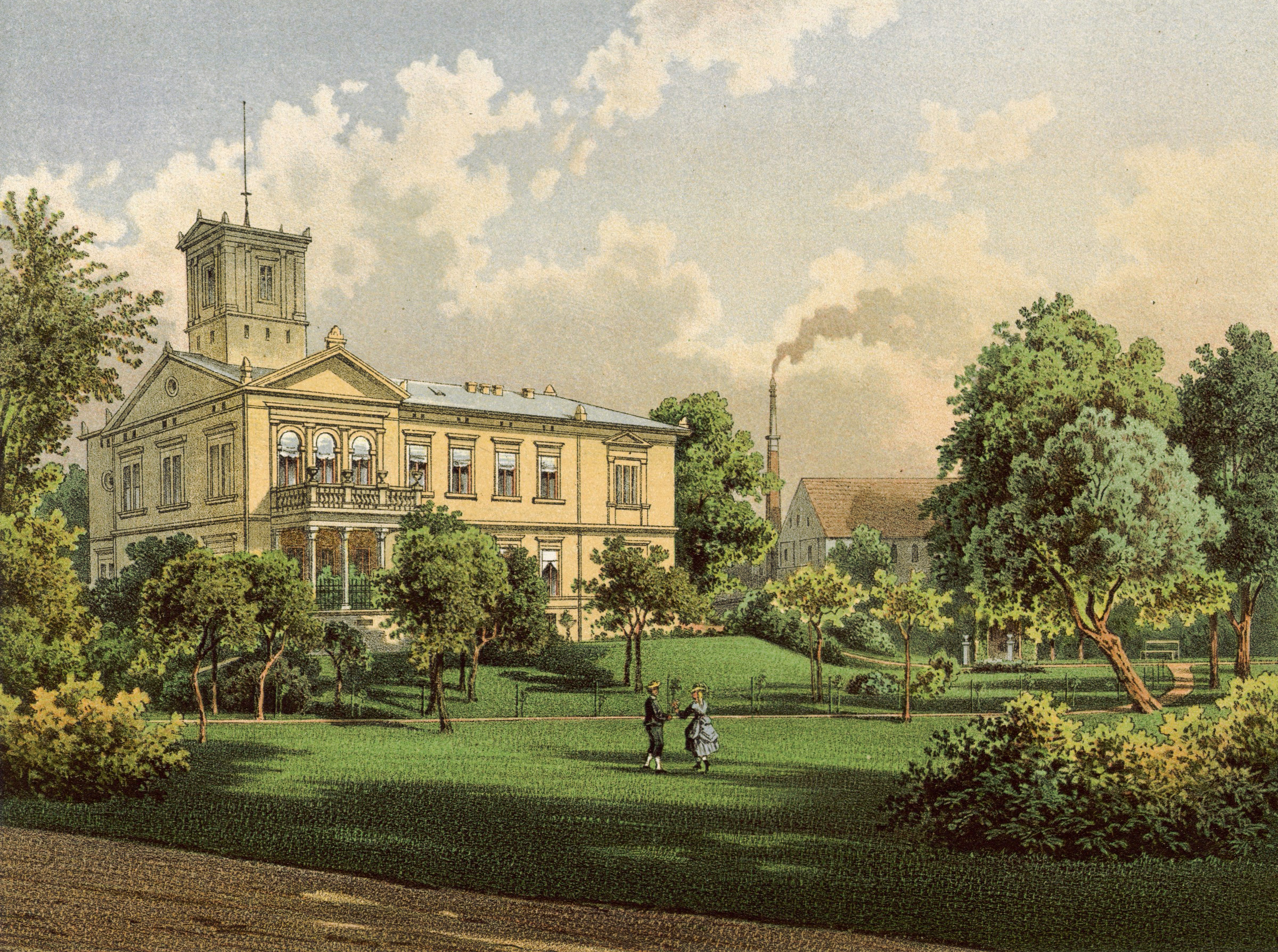
Palace Groß-Glienicke, around 1860, Edition by Alexander Duncker

Groß Glienicke (German pronunciation: [ɡʁoːs ˈɡliːnɪkə], lit. 'Big Glienicke') is a village located both in Berlin and Potsdam, the capital of the German state of Brandenburg. Until 2003, when it was merged into Potsdam, the Brandenburg—and main—side, was an autonomous municipality. The Berlin side is part of Kladow in the Spandau district.

== Overview ==
The district contains an area of 6.37 square miles (16.5 km^{2}) and has a population of 3,172 inhabitants. The principal geographic feature is the Groß Glienicker See (lake). The former Saxon Crown Prince Georg, who had renounced his royal heritage to become a Jesuit priest, drowned in the Groß Glienicker See on May 14, 1943, allegedly murdered by the Gestapo. The area is largely forested and surrounded by historic manor houses and former royal estates.

== See also ==
- Seeburger Zipfel
- Lily Pincus
