= Sacrower See =

Lake in Potsdam, Brandenburg, Germany

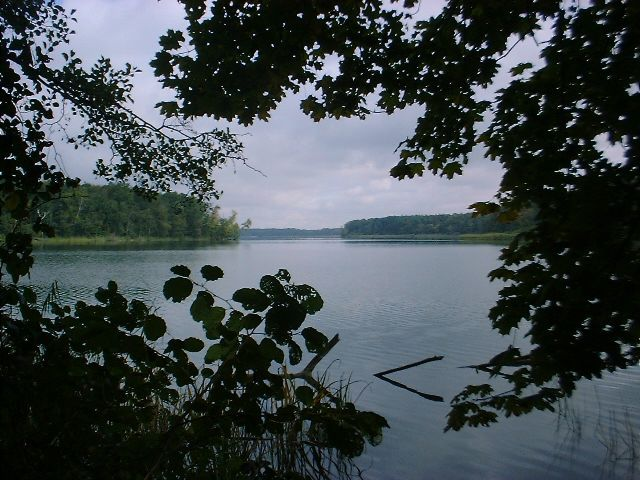
- view to the northeast from the south shore

- Location within Brandenburg
- Location: Potsdam, Brandenburg
- Coordinates: 52°26′N 13°06′E
- Basin countries: Germany
- Max. length: 2.8 km (1.7 mi)
- Max. width: 406 m (1,332 ft)
- Surface area: 0.667 km^{2} (0.258 sq mi)
- Surface elevation: 29.4 m (96 ft)

The Sacrower See (German pronunciation: [ˈzakʁoːɐ zeː]) is a German lake in the northern part of Potsdam in the State of Brandenburg.

== Overview ==
The Sacrower See, with the Groß Glienicker See 0.7 km to the north and the Heiliger See 1.6 km from Potsdam, forms a chain of lakes which flow into the extensive network of Havel River waterways.

The lake extends in a north-south direction for over 2.8 km. Its widest point is 406 m and its narrowest 190 m. Sacrow, a district of Potsdam, is located on the southeastern shore. The remaining shore is forested and part of the Königswald Nature Preserve.

During the Cold War, the lake was part of the border isolating West Berlin and kept under close East German surveillance. In 1986 Rainer Liebeke of Gotha drowned in Sacrower See when attempting to escape to West Berlin.

== See also ==
- Weißer See
