= Civil Administration Area of Luxembourg =

Nazi German military administration, 1940–1944

Civil Administration Area of Luxembourg CdZ-Gebiet Luxemburg Zivill Administratiouns Gebitt vu Lëtzebuerg Territoire du chef de l'administration civile en Luxembourg
- 1940–1944
- Flag Coat of arms

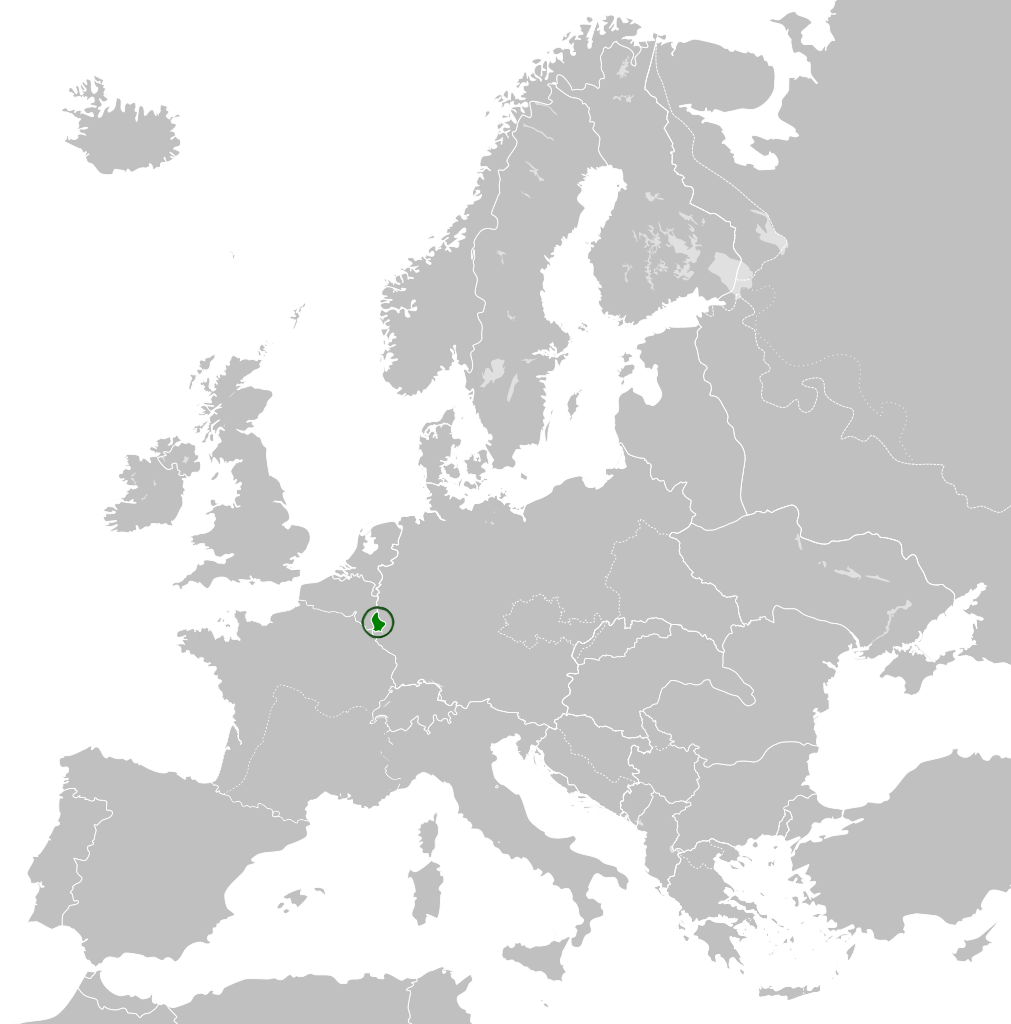
- Status: Civil administration under German occupation
- Capital: Luxembourg City
- Common languages: German (official language from 6 August 1940 onwards); Luxembourgish; French (banned from 6 August 1940 onwards)
- Chief of the Civil Administration
  - 1940–1944: Gustav Simon
- Deputy Chief of the Civil Administration
  - 1940–1944: Heinrich Christian Siekmeier
- Historical era: World War II
  - Established: 29 July 1940
  - Disestablished: 9 September 1944

Population
  - 1940: 290,000
- Currency: Reichsmark (declared legal currency on 26 August 1940 and declared the only legal currency on 20 January 1941); Luxembourgish franc (no longer legal currency on 20 January 1941 and after)
Preceded by	Succeeded by
Military Administration of Luxembourg	Luxembourg
- Today part of: Luxembourg

The Civil Administration Area of Luxembourg (German: CdZ-Gebiet Luxemburg), also translated as the Territory of the Chief of Civil Administration of Luxembourg, was an administrative division of Nazi Germany. Following the 1940 German conquest of Luxembourg, the country was subsequently de facto annexed and made part of Gau Moselland.

== History ==
Gustav Simon was appointed Chief of Civil Administration (German: Chef der Zivilverwaltung, CdZ) by the Oberkommando des Heeres on 21 July 1940. Luxembourg was then included in CdZ-Gebiet Luxemburg on 29 July. While initially subordinate to the military commands in Belgium and Northern France, Simon was confirmed in his appointment on 2 August by Adolf Hitler himself, indicating that he reported directly to the Führer and no one else. This granted him a wide degree of autonomy with regards to the military and civil authorities of Nazi Germany.

Simon, who was also the Gauleiter of the neighbouring Gau Koblenz-Trier, later Moselland (Gauleiter being a title denoting the leader of a regional branch of the Nazi party), led a propaganda and later terror campaign, known as Heim ins Reich, to convince the population that they were ethnic Germans and a natural part of the Third Reich. His objective was "to win Luxembourg back over to the German nation as soon as possible". He was convinced that Luxembourgers only needed a level of education and enlightenment in order to voluntarily declare their loyalty to Germany. He deduced this from his belief that they were, in fact, German "by blood and by descent". To the Gauleiter, Luxembourgish independence was an "absurd idea", which existed only because the monarchy and government had nurtured it: if the Luxembourgers were shown evidence of their belonging to the German nation, the will to be independent must disappear.

=== Germanification ===
The administration of Simon arrived in Luxembourg fully persuaded that the "German-ness" of the Luxembourgers merely lay under a thin external layer of French influence. This in turn meant that, with a bit of determined "unraveling" by his administration, the German character of the population would essentially reveal itself.

Simon had two clear goals:

- The Nazification and Germanisation of Luxembourg, i.e., the extinction of everything that was not of German origin, like French names and words of French origin or a French way of life
- The destruction and dismemberment of the Luxembourgish state institutions, and the country's incorporation into the Third Reich

His first series of decrees made this policy very clear:

- 6 August 1940: German became the only official language, and the usage of the French language was banned. The ban applied to official and administrative usage as well as everyday life. French expressions of courtesy such as "Bonjour", "Merci", "Monsieur", "Madame", etc. were included: people greeting each other had to say "Heil Hitler".
- Autumn 1940: The political parties and independent labour unions, the Parliament and the Conseil d'Etat were dissolved. All civil society organisations and the press were subjected to Nazi control.
- By the end of 1940 German law was introduced including the Sondergerichte and the Nuremberg Laws.
- 31 January 1941: French-sounding family names, first names, and the names of streets, towns, shops and companies were Germanised, that is, translated into their German counterpart or simply replaced by something more Germanic. Henri became Heinrich, Dupont became Brückner.
- 18 February 1941: Wearing a beret (a traditional cap from the French Basque Country) was forbidden.
- From May 1941 many Luxembourgish youth were ordered to participate in the Reich Labour Service.
- On August 30, 1942, the Gauleiter, Gustav Simon, delivered a speech, he announced the introduction of compulsory military service and the conferral of German citizenship upon the affected conscription years. In Alsace and Lorraine, the exact same step toward conscription had been taken just a few days earlier.

A massive propaganda campaign was launched to influence the population, while not only dissidents and critics but also teachers, officials and leading business figures were threatened with losing their jobs unless they joined Nazi organisations, which led to much increased recruitment from all professions. A central registry documented the personal opinion regarding the Nazi regime of almost every citizen. People who were openly opposed to the regime lost their jobs or were deported, mainly to eastern Germany and in the worst cases sent to the death camps where many of them died.

In October 1941, the German occupiers took a survey of Luxembourgish civilians who were asked to state their nationality, their mother tongue and their racial group, but contrary to German expectations, 95% answered "Luxembourgish" to each question. The refusal to declare themselves as German citizens led to mass arrests.

The occupation authorities attempted to cover Luxembourg with a net of political, social and cultural organisations, such as also existed in Germany, including the Hitler Youth, the League of German Girls, the Winterhilfswerk, the National Socialist Women's League, and the German Labour Front.
