= Hanns and Rudolf =

Book by Thomas Harding

Hanns and Rudolf: The German Jew and the Hunt for the Kommandant of Auschwitz
- Author: Thomas Harding
- Subject: Hanns Alexander and Rudolf Höss
- Genre: Biography
- Publisher: Penguin Random House
- Publication date: 2013
- Pages: 384
- ISBN: 978-0099559054

Hanns and Rudolf: The German Jew and the Hunt for the Kommandant of Auschwitz is a dual biography of Hanns Alexander and Rudolf Höss by the British-American journalist Thomas Harding.

== Reception ==
Hanns and Rudolf was a The Sunday Times bestseller in hardback and paperback in the UK, and a bestseller in Israel and Italy.

== Awards and honours ==
- 2015 Jewish Quarterly-Wingate Prize joint winner
- 2013 Costa Book Awards, shortlisted (Biography)
- 2014 Waterstones Non Fiction Book of the Month
- 2013 Book of the Year in The Sunday Times, Times, Telegraph, New Statesman, Observer and Guardian newspapers
- 2013, August Times Book of the Week

== Editions ==
- First UK edition: Hanns and Rudolf: The German Jew and the Hunt for the Kommandant of Auschwitz, Random House, Great Britain, 2013, ISBN 978-0099559054
- First US edition: Hanns and Rudolf: The True Story of the German Jew who tracked and Caught the Kommandant of Auschwitz, Simon & Schuster, New York, 2013. ISBN 978-1476711850
- German translation by Michael Schwelien : Hanns und Rudolf: Der deutsche Jude und die Jagd nach dem Kommandanten von Auschwitz, DTV, 2014, ISBN 978-3423280440

== Adaptations ==
In May 2014 it was announced that Hanns and Rudolf had been optioned by The Ink Factory Films and that the company was in talks with Sir Ronald Harwood to adapt the book. It was subsequently announced in May 2019 that the book had since been optioned by Altitude Film Entertainment.
