= Thomas Harding (writer) =

Author, journalist, and documentary maker

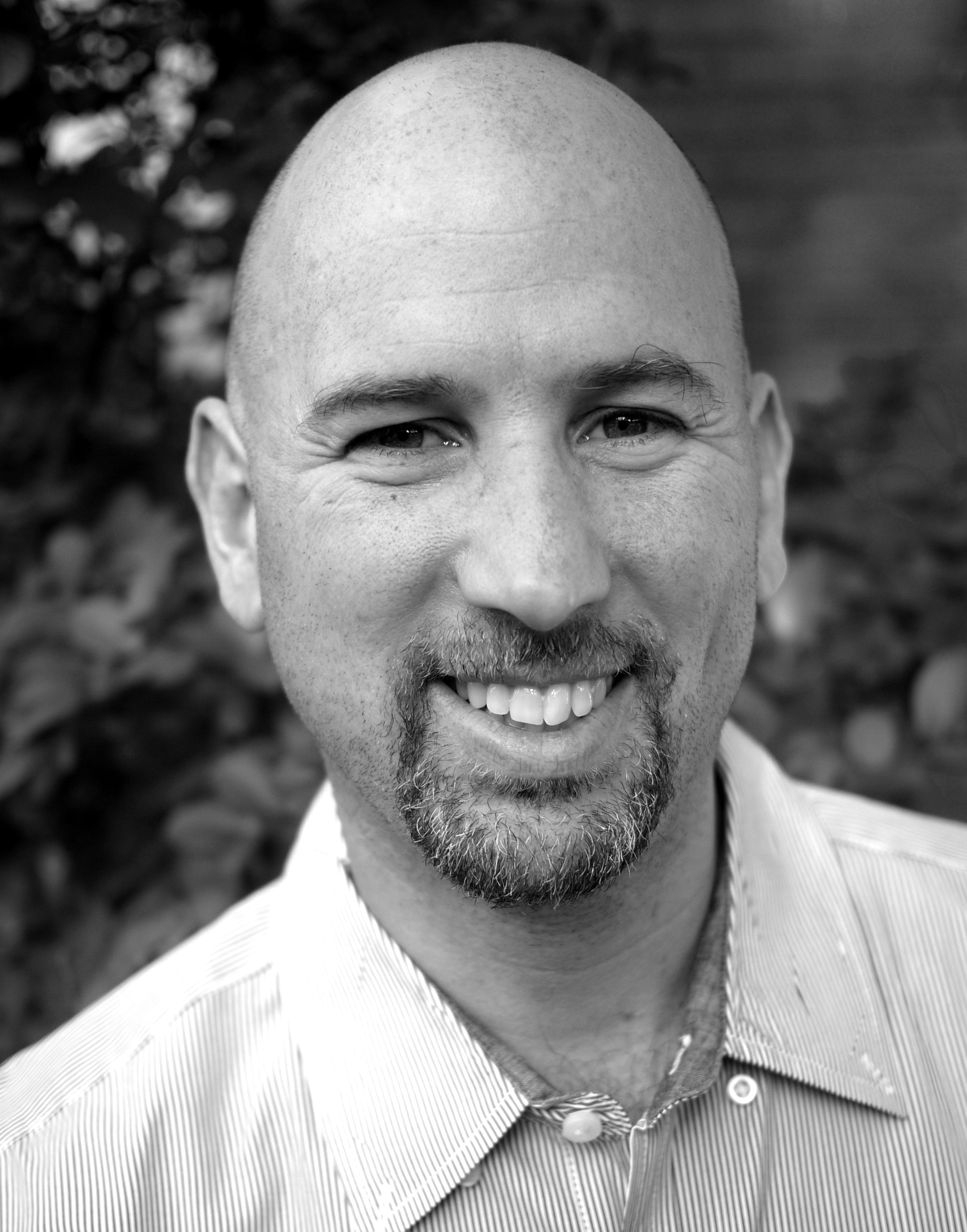
- Born: 31 August 1968 (age 58)
- Education: Corpus Christi College, Cambridge
- Occupations: Author and journalist
- Writing career
- Genre: Non-fiction

Thomas Harding (born 31 August 1968, London) is a non-fiction author, journalist, and documentary maker. He holds joint British, American and German citizenship.

== Life and career ==
Harding was educated at Westminster School in London and then studied anthropology and political science at Corpus Christi College, Cambridge. Alfred Alexander is his great-grandfather. He is the great-nephew of Hanns Alexander. It was only after Alexander's funeral in 2006 that Harding learned what he had done during the Second World War.

=== Early work ===
Harding and his wife were joint CEOs and co-founders of the Oxford Channel, a local television channel operating under a restricted service licence. In 2000, the board voted to sell the station and its operating company to Milestone Group. The station is no longer operational.

In December 2006 Harding became co-owner and publisher of the Shepherdstown Observer in West Virginia. In 2010 the newspaper won a Freedom of Information Act case before the West Virginia Supreme Court, which resulted in referendum petitions being released to it. While in the US, he helped develop the American Conservation Film Festival (ACFF), in partnership with the National Conservation Training Center.

In 2010 he convinced John Doyle, a delegate in the West Virginia House of Delegates, of the need for a state law protecting reporters' privilege not to reveal their sources; the reporters' shield bill sponsored by Doyle was passed by the West Virginia House and Senate in March 2011. In March 2011 he sold his interest in the paper.

=== Writing ===
Harding's book Hanns and Rudolf: The German Jew and the Hunt for the Kommandant of Auschwitz was released in 2013. It won the Jewish Quarterly-Wingate Prize and was shortlisted for the Costa Book Award. His next book, Kadian Journal, was published in 2014; it is about his son, who died in a cycling accident. Doron Weber of the Washington Post described it as "a fine, brave book."

The House by the Lake, an account of the five families, including his grandmother, who lived in Alexander Haus, a house in Berlin, was published in 2015. Harding, local residents and his family, saved the building from demolition and established a charity to set it up as a cultural and historical centre. The book was shortlisted for the Costa Book Award for Biography in 2015 and longlisted for the Orwell Award in 2016.

Blood on the Page was published in 2018. It is the investigation of the 2006 murder of the London-based author Allan Chappelow and the man found guilty of the crime, Wang Yam. The murder trial was the first in modern British history to be held in secret. It won the Crime Writers' Association Gold Dagger for Non-Fiction. Harding's next book was Legacy, published in 2019. It tells the story of J. Lyons and Co.

In 2020, Harding released two books for young readers: Future History: 2050, and a picture-book adaptation of his 2015 The House by the Lake. In 2022, Harding published the book White Debt on an uprising by enslaved people in Demerara in 1823; the Guardian gave the book a positive review.

In 2023, Harding's second picture book was published, The House on the Canal, in collaboration with the illustrator Britta Teckentrup. The book focuses on the history of the Anne Frank house. Also in 2023, Harding's book The Maverick was published, a biography about the Austrian-Jewish publisher George Weidenfeld; it received favorable reviews from the Wall Street Journal and the Washington Post. In 2025, Harding's eighth adult non-fiction book was released, The Einstein Vendetta, about the murder of Albert Einstein's relatives in Florence, Italy, during World War II.

== Bibliography ==
- Hanns and Rudolf: The German Jew and the Hunt for the Kommandant of Auschwitz (London: Penguin Random House, 2013)
- Kadian Journal – A Father’s Story (Random House, 2014)
- The House By The Lake: Berlin. One House. Five Families. A Hundred years of History (Random House, 2015)
- Blood On The Page: A Murder, a Secret Trial, a Search for the Truth (Random House, 2018)
- Legacy: One Family, a Cup of Tea, and the Company who took on the World (Random House, 2019)
- The House By The Lake – picture book (Walker Books, 2020)
- Future History: 2050 (Jacoby & Stuart, 2020)
- White Debt: The Demerara Uprising and Britain’s Legacy of Slavery (Weidenfeld & Nicolson, 2022)
- The House On The Canal – picture book (Jacoby & Stuart, 2023)
- The Maverick: George Weidenfeld and the Golden Age of Publishing (Weidenfeld & Nicolson, 2023)
- The House On The Farm – picture book (Jacoby & Stuart, 2023)
- The House By The Park – picture book (Jacoby & Stuart, 2025)
- The Einstein Vendetta: Hitler Mussolini and a True Story of Murder (Michael Joseph, 2025)
