= Hanns Alexander =

Nazi hunter who arrested Rudolf Höss in 1946

- Born: 6 May 1917; Berlin, Germany
- Died: 23 December 2006 (aged 89); London, England
- Known for: Nazi hunter

Hanns Alexander (6 May 1917 – 23 December 2006) was a German Nazi hunter who tracked down and arrested Gustav Simon, a Nazi Party official, and Rudolf Höss, the Kommandant of Auschwitz.

== Life ==
A German Jew, Alexander was born in Berlin to father Alfred Alexander and mother Henny. He grew up with his twin brother Paul in a wealthy household. His father was a prominent physician who counted many well-known actors, artists, and scientists, including Albert Einstein, among his friends and patients. In 1936, after being tipped off that he was on a Gestapo arrest list, Alfred remained in London where he was visiting a daughter, and managed to help the rest of his family emigrate to England via Switzerland.

In September 1939, after the outbreak of the Second World War, Alexander volunteered for the British Army, but was refused as an enemy alien. He managed to join the Royal Pioneer Corps as a private in 1940, attended officer training in 1943, and in 1945 was an interpreter at interrogations of guards and staff at the newly liberated Bergen-Belsen concentration camp.

"Gripped by a righteous anger," and having learned that Rudolf Höss, the former Auschwitz Kommandant, had gone into hiding, Alexander asked his superiors for permission to track down fugitive war crimes suspects, but was denied. He embarked on a search for Höss in his spare time, and when the "No. 1 War Crimes Investigation Team" was formed by the British government in mid-1945 he was asked to join, and became a full-time Nazi hunter. His first major success was tracking down and arresting in December 1945 Gustav Simon, who was, as the Nazi Gauleiter in the Moselland Gau from 1940 until 1944, the Chief of the Civil Administration in Luxembourg, which was occupied at that time by Nazi Germany. In Luxembourg, Simon was responsible for the early and speedy deportation of the Jewish population, and the executions of resistance fighters.

Alexander arrested Rudolf Höss on 11 March 1946 in Gottrupel (Germany), where he lived disguised as a gardener and called himself Franz Lang. Höss's wife had given up his address after Alexander beat her teenage son and threatened to send him to Siberia — something he would not have been able to do. Höss initially denied his identity "insisting he was a lowly gardener, but Alexander saw his wedding ring and ordered Höss to take it off, promising to cut off his finger if he didn't. Höss' name was inscribed inside. The Jewish soldiers accompanying Alexander began to beat Höss with axe handles. After a few moments and a minor internal debate, Alexander pulled them off."

After the war, Alexander had a long professional career as a merchant banker at S.G. Warburg. He died in London at age 89.

His story is told in the book Hanns and Rudolf by Thomas Harding.
