= Gau Moselland =

Administrative division or Nazi Germany

Coordinates: 50.35°N 7.59°E

- Gau of Nazi Germany
- 1931–1945
- Flag Coat of arms

- Nazi Germany by 1944
- Capital: Koblenz
- Government
- Gauleiter
  - 1931–1945: Gustav Simon
- History
  - Establishment: 1 June 1931
  - Disestablishment: 8 May 1945
Preceded by	Succeeded by
Rhine Province; Luxembourg	Rhineland-Palatinate; Luxembourg
- Today part of: Germany; Luxembourg

The Gau Moselland, formed as Gau Koblenz-Trier in June 1931, was an administrative division of Nazi Germany from 1933 to 1945 in the Prussian Rhine Province. Before that, from 1931 to 1933, it was the regional subdivision of the Nazi Party in that area. On 24 January 1941, the Gau was renamed Gau Moselland, Mosel being the German name of the river Moselle. Following the 1940 German conquest of Luxembourg, the country was subsequently made a part of Gau Moselland.

== History ==
The Nazi Gau (plural Gaue) system was originally established in a party conference on 22 May 1926, in order to improve administration of the party structure. From 1933 onwards, after the Nazi seizure of power, the Gaue increasingly replaced the German states as administrative subdivisions in Germany.

At the head of each Gau stood a Gauleiter, a position which became increasingly more powerful, especially after the outbreak of the Second World War, with little interference from above. Local Gauleiters often held government positions as well as party ones and were in charge of, among other things, propaganda and surveillance and, from September 1944 onward, the Volkssturm and the defense of the Gau.

The position of Gauleiter in Moselland was held by Gustav Simon for the duration of the existence of the Gau while Fritz Reckmann served as his deputy during this time. Simon, unpopular even with many Nazi Party members because of his arrogance and nepotism, attempted to brutally suppress all resistance to the Germanisation of Luxembourg. He escaped and hid at the end of the war but was arrested by the British Army in December 1945 and was found hanged in his cell.
