= Liberation Government =

Government of Luxembourg, 1944–1945

The Liberation Government was formed on 23 November 1944, when the government in exile came to Luxembourg from London and felt forced to include members of the Unio'n vun den Fraiheetsorgansatiounen, the umbrella group of the Luxembourgish Resistance which had been maintaining order since the liberation by American troops on 10 September 1944, in order to tame its critics.

On 23 February 1945 Robert Als and the aide-de-camp to the Grand-Duchess, Guillaume Konsbruck were added, as well as on 21 April 1945 Nicolas Margue, who was returning from resettlement.

One problem was that out of 55 pre-war Deputies, only 25 remained. The rest had been killed, resettled, or were suspected of collaboration with the Nazis. The government only wanted to organise new elections to the Chamber of Deputies when the war was over and people had returned from deportation. It therefore took decisions based on the laws of 1938 and 1939, which gave it increased powers in times of crisis. This provoked heavy criticism, so the government established a Consultative Assembly, which apart from the remaining Deputies also included members of the resistance.

21 October 1945 saw the first elections since the liberation, which provided the National Union Government on 14 November.

== Return ==
On 23 September 1944, only two weeks after the liberation of the capital by the US Army, the Luxembourgish government returned from exile. It was confronted with grave material and moral difficulties. The immediate priorities were the population's food supply, the provision of coke for heavy industry, purges, the repatriation of deported Luxembourgers and reconstruction.

Before the liberation of the country's territory, the Allies had recognised the Luxembourgish government in London as the sole legal representative of the Grand Duchy. However, after their return from exile, the four ministers found their authority greatly limited, even contested. On the one hand, politicians had to bow to the military interests of the Allies as long as the war against Nazi Germany was still ongoing. The Allies sent a mission of Supreme Headquarters Allied Expeditionary Force, composed of American, British, Canadian and Luxembourgish officers. After the Liberation, this commission was de facto the supreme military and civil authority in Luxembourg. On the other hand, the Resistance movements, who sought moral legitimacy, contested the government's powers. To remedy the authorities' lack of power, the Unio’n's militia maintained order and arrested collaborators, which gave rise to abuses. The Resistance movements which were gathered in the Unio’n saw themselves as existing outside and above the traditional parties. In an appeal to the Grand Duchess, they demanded a new government. They accused the "London men" of being sluggish and unenthusiastic in their efforts to repatriate deported countrymen, and to punish collaborators. In response, Pierre Dupong decided to enlarge his government by including men who had lived in the country during the occupation. On 23 November 1944, Pierre Frieden joined the government to replace the minister for education, Nicolas Margue, who was still abroad after having been deported in the war. On 23 February 1945, the public prosecutor Robert Als was appointed minister for the interior and took over from Victor Bodson the difficult portfolio of purges. Guillaume Konsbruck, an officer and aide de camp to the Grand Duchess, became minister for agriculture. After his return from deportation, on 21 April 1945, Nicolas Margue rejoined the government, taking over the departments of agriculture and repatriation.

In the immediate aftermath of the war, the government worked without a parliament. When the Chamber of Deputies had its first session after the war on 6 December 1944, only 25 Deputies out of 55 were present. The rest were either still imprisoned in Germany, deceased, or suspected collaborators. However, the government wanted to await the end of the war and the return of the deported and political prisoners before calling elections. In the meantime, it relied on the laws of 28 September 1938 and 29 August 1939 to legislate. These expanded the government's powers to create new laws if the legislature was unable to carry out its functions. To give itself greater legitimacy, and to provide a forum for public discontent, the government decided to create a Consultative Assembly. This sat for 18 sessions between 20 March and 16 August 1945. Composed of former Deputies and representatives of the Resistance, the Assembly became the principal tribune for opposition to the government. On 31 May, Dupong defused the conflict by announcing legislative elections for 21 October 1945.

== Foreign policy ==
By choosing exile and actively taking the Allied side, the Luxembourgish government had broken with its traditional security policy based on neutrality. After Liberation, it followed through with a reorientation of its foreign policy. On 26 June 1945, the Grand Duchy signed the United Nations Charter in San Francisco, becoming a founding member of the new organisation. This was a highly symbolic act, as it reflected the government's wish to participate in international politics. It was also this desire to assume international responsibilities which made the government introduce obligatory military service by decree of 30 November 1944. The gradual creation of an army with the help of the British would allow Luxembourg to participate in the occupation of Germany, and to be a party to the military agreements of the post-war period. In 1944, in the euphoria of the Liberation, the introduction of conscription encountered wide support among the population.

== Domestic policy ==
In the first days of the Liberation, the Unio’n's militia, which had given itself police powers, proceeded to arrest hundreds of collaborators or suspected collaborators. To put these imprisonments on a legal footing and reduce arbitrary arrests, the government stipulated by decree of 12 October 1944 that only the minister for justice, advised by a special commission, could order internment. By July 1945, the number of political prisoners had reached over 5,000. These were put to work in reconstruction or demining. On 30 November 1944, the government started a massive investigation into the attitude and actions of the civil servants who remained in place during the occupation. This was later extended to other professional categories. The administrative purge led to 20,000 cases being opened, of which 80% were closed without any action.

On 16 December 1944, the country was surprised by the Ardennes Offensive. The Germans breached the American front, which had stabilised along the Our and the Sûre, and re-occupied the northern half of the country. It was not until 22 February that the last German soldier had left the Grand Duchy's territory. The battle of the Ardennes devastated the Oesling and the region around Echternach, displaced large numbers of the population and worsened the food supply situation. Confronted with a state of emergency, the government created several institutions to allow it to intervene in the economy: the Office of Prices, the Supply Commissariat, the General Commissariat for Reconstruction, the Office for War Damages. Yet it also kept several of the measures introduced by the occupier concerning taxation and supply. The decree of 26 October 1944 stipulated that the measures taken by the occupiers before 10 September 1944 with regards to taxes, fees and charges would continue to be applicable. The German tax system, initially conceived to sustain the Nazi war effort, could also be used to finance reconstruction and the compensation of war damages. In addition, a special wealth tax of 5% was introduced. The difficulties of supply obliged the government to introduce rationing measures and to restrict consumption.

Despite this austerity policy, strikes were rare. Through social reforms, the government mitigated the negative consequences of the post-war period. The decree of 30 December 1944 introduced a minimum wage. The creation of a National Labour Conference, which included representatives of business-owners, workers and the government, made it possible to resolve social conflicts by consensus. This institution replaced the National Labour Council, created in 1936. Unemployment remained under control. The workers of the mining and steel industries, in which production had ceased due to lack of fuel, were employed in reconstruction work. The government tried to avoid being too strict in monetary policy while still minimising inflation. The decree of 14 October 1944 regulated the exchange of Reichsmarks and Luxembourgish francs. The Reichsmark, which had been introduced by the German occupiers at the rate of 1:10, was now worth 5 francs, but the first batch of 100 Reichsmarks were converted at 10 francs. Belgium provided Luxembourg with the required notes for the operation. While the government ably dealt with the various socio-economic problems of the post-war period, it seemed unable to overcome one major worry: that of the repatriation of 30,000 Luxembourgers who had been deported in the war. The slow pace of their return caused bitter criticism.

== Composition ==
=== 23 November 1944 to 21 April 1945 ===
- Pierre Dupong (CSV): Minister of State, head of government, Minister of Finance and the Army
- Joseph Bech (CSV): Foreign Minister, Minister for Wine-growing
- Pierre Krier (Workers party): Minister for Labor and Social Security
- Victor Bodson (Workers): Minister for Justice and Transport
- Pierre Frieden (CSV): Minister for Schools, Culture, Arts and Sciences

From 23 February 1945 also:

- Robert Als: Minister for the Interior
- Guillaume Konsbruck: Minister for Agriculture, Trade, Industry, Occupations, and Supply

=== 21 April 1945 until 14 November 1945 ===
- Pierre Dupong (CSV): Minister of State, head of government, Minister of Finance and the Army
- Joseph Bech (CSV): Foreign Minister, Minister for Wine-growing
- Pierre Krier (Workers): Minister for Labor and Social Security
- Nicolas Margue (CSV): Minister for Agriculture
- Victor Bodson (Workers): Minister for Justice and Transport
- Pierre Frieden (CSV): Minister for Schools, Culture, Arts and Sciences
- Robert Als: Minister for the Interior
- Guillaume Konsbruck: Minister for Supply and the Economy
