= Émile Speller =

Luxembourgish military officer

Honorary Colonel Émile Speller A de C
- Born: 7 October 1875; Niederanven, Luxembourg
- Died: 17 January 1952 (aged 76); Luxembourg City, Luxembourg
- Military career
- Allegiance: Luxembourg
- Service years: 1902–1945
- Rank: Major; Colonel (honorary)
- Commands: Major Commandant of the Gendarmes and Volunteers Corps
- Conflicts: World War I: German Invasion of Luxembourg; World War II: Invasion of Luxembourg (surrendered)
- Awards: Order of the Oak Crown (Grand Officer); Order of Adolphe of Nassau (Grand Cross)

Émile Speller (7 October 1875 – 17 January 1952) was a Luxembourgish military officer and the commander of the country's Gendarmes and Volunteers Corps (Corps des Gendarmes et Volontaires) during the German invasion of Luxembourg in World War II. He also served as aide-de-camp to several members of the Grand Ducal Family throughout his career and chamberlain of the Grand Ducal court.

== Biography ==
Émile Speller was born on 7 October 1875 in Niederanven. On 1 June 1902 he began his service with the Grand Ducal Court, being appointed as an aide by Adolphe, Grand Duke of Luxembourg. He subsequently served as aide-de-camp to Grand Duke William, Grand Duchess regent Marie Anna, Grand Duchess Marie-Adélaïde, and Grand Duchess Charlotte. On 12 January 1927, he was promoted to the rank of captain. On 25 February 1937, Speller was appointed Major-Commandant of the Corps des Gendarmes et Volontaires. On 30 April 1937, he was appointed via ministerial order to be chairman of the supervisory commission on forestry education. On 2 February 1938, he was appointed to the High Military Court of Luxembourg.

Major Speller reorganized Luxembourg's troops on 24 February 1939. He still served as the force's commander during the German invasion of Luxembourg on 10 May 1940. (Note: The Corps des Gendarmes et Volontaires was under the ceremonial command of Prince Felix, but actual control of the unit rested with Speller.) Most of the soldiers did not partake in the fighting, as only those who volunteered for guard duty were stationed along the border. The rest remained in their barracks, leaving the defence of the country to the Grand Ducal Gendarmerie. Total casualties amounted to six gendarmes and one soldier wounded. Twenty-two soldiers (six officers and 16 non-commissioned officers) and 54 gendarmes were captured.

After the invasion Speller was briefly incarcerated by the Gestapo. He was released but monitored closely by them throughout the rest of the occupation. On 3 March 1945, the returned and reformed Luxembourg government appointed Speller to the 1945 Pension Board for the Army. On 7 October, the government retroactively recognized Speller's resignation, effective exactly five years previously. On 9 August 1946 he was granted the title of honorary colonel. Speller continued his service to the government as the chamberlain of the Grand Ducal Court. He died at his home in Luxembourg City on 17 January 1952 following a long illness.

== See also ==
- Guillaume Konsbruck
