= Maurice Stein =

Maurice Stein may refer to:

- Maurice B. Stein (1918–1976), owner of the summer camp Camp Echo Lake (New York)
- Maurice R. Stein (1926–2024), American sociologist and innovator in higher education
- Maurice Stein (gendarme) (1884–1957), Luxembourgish captain

== See also ==
- Maurice Steijn (born 1973), Dutch football manager and former footballer
