= Consultative Assembly =

Consultative Assembly may refer to:

- Consultative Assembly (Luxembourg)
- Consultative Assembly of Oman
- Consultative Assembly of Qatar
- Consultative Assembly of Saudi Arabia
- Federal Consultative Assembly
- Islamic Consultative Assembly
- People's Consultative Assembly
