= Henri Koch-Kent =

Luxembourgish publicist, author, historian

Henri Koch-Kent (2 May 1905, Luxembourg — 8 October 1999) was a Luxembourgish publicist author (in French/German), historian, active in the Luxembourgish Resistance during World War II.

After attending the Athenaeum and the Echternach Gymnasium, he studied law from 1927 to 1935 at the Cours supérieurs in Luxembourg and at the Universities of: Alger, Caen, Toulouse, Paris and Brussels. After his studies he took over the general agency of German companies in Luxembourg. When Hitler came to power, he ended this business activity and became involved in the fight against fascism at the anti-fascist movement early on and by helping to set up a spy network for the French intelligence service.

He became president of the Association générale des étudiants luxembourgeois

== During World War II ==
On 10 May 1940 (the day Germany invaded France, The Netherlands, Belgium and Luxembourg) he left Luxembourg and entered the service of the French military authorities. In June he moved to London, where he worked first as an editor for the INBEL agency [Belgian News Agency], then as a head of the department at the Belgian Ministère de l'Information. He was also responsible for the Luxembourg, Belgian and French programs at the BBC. He "played an important role with the Luxembourg government in London." There he met his wife, the illustrator Alison Kent (b. 1913 - d. 2006). (Alison Koch-Kent). Born Henri Kent, in order not to be confused with a politician (1919-1987) of the same name, he adopted her family name and called himself "Henri Koch-Kent" from then on.

As the Luxembourg government in exile was criticized by members of the Resistance and others for its lack of help towards Luxembourgers attempting to flee their occupied country during the war. Its inactivity persuaded two of its critics, the resistance members Henri Koch-Kent and Mac Schleich, the presenter of the Luxembourgish BBC programme, to found the Association des Luxembourgeois en Grande-Bretagne ("Association of Luxembourgers in Great Britain") in London, which counted 300 refugees from Luxembourg and men who had been forcibly conscripted into the German armed forces but had defected to the Allies. It was founded on 10 May 1944.

== After World War II ==
After the war, Koch-Kent was active in its founding of the Union of European Federalists (Union européenne des fédéralistes) at Luxembourg meeting, and worked as its deputy general secretary.

He had worked as a journalist, e.g. for international press agencies. In 1959 he became editor of the liberal Lëtzebuerger Journal from 1961 to July 1964 he was its director. In the 1970s and 1980s, Koch-Kent wrote and edited several books on the Second World War, in which he critically examined the role of Luxembourg's government-in-exile.

He was also with Amicale des anciens des services spéciaux de la défense nationale. (AASSDN) [Association of veterans of the special services of national defense].

In 1998, Henri Koch-Kent was the first winner of the Testimonial and Presence prize created by Nic Weber and Les Cahiers Luxembourgeois.

== Writings ==
- 10 mai 1940 en Luxembourg: Témoignages et documents, 1971.
- Hitlertum in Luxemburg, 1933–44. Beiträge zur Zeitgeschichte, Luxembourg: Hermann, 1972.
- Luxemburger als Freiwild (with Hohengarten, Andre), Luxembourg: Hermann, 1972.
- Luxemburg im SD-Spiegel, Luxembourg: Hermann, 1973.
- Sie boten Trotz. Luxemburger im Freiheitskampf, 1974.
- Doudot. Figure légendaire du contre-espionnage français, 1976.
- Putsch in Luxemburg. Ein Schildbürgerstreich, 1980.
- Ils ont dit NON au fascisme. Rejet de la loi muselière par le référendum de 1937, 1982
- Vu et entendu. 2 Bde.: Souvenirs d'une époque controversée. 1912–1940, Luxembourg: Hermann, 1983; Années d'exil. 1940–1944, 1986.
- Halte à la falsification de l'histoire : le Procès Gomand (1945-1947) : 114 témoins contre le gouvernement luxembourgeois en exil, Luxembourg: Hermann, 1988
- Der parteilose Einzelgänger. Im Blick seiner Zeitgenossen, 1990.

His mémoires, accounts, (among other historians') including of a government Antisemitic incident against a student in 1933, was included in Luxembourg government's 2015 report: The "Jewish Question" in Luxembourg (1933-1941): The Luxembourg State in the Face of Nazi Anti-Semitic Persecution. The report was unanimously adopted in the government and it apologized to the Jewish community.
