= Guillaume Konsbruck =

Luxembourgian politician (1909–1983)

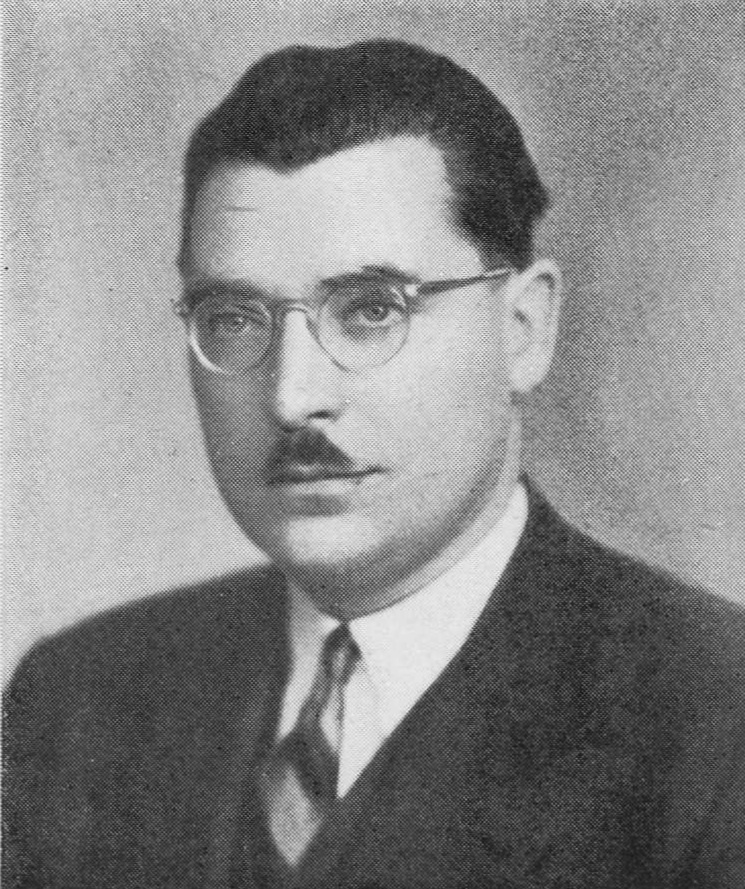
- Konsbruck c. 1945

Aide-de-camp to the Grand Duchess
- In office May 1940 – April 1945
- Monarch: Charlotte

Minister for Agriculture, Trade, Industry, Occupations, and Supply
- Monarch: Charlotte
- Prime Minister: Pierre Dupong

Personal details
- Born: 3 September 1909
- Died: 3 October 1983 (aged 74)
- Occupation: Politician

Military service
- Allegiance: Luxembourg
- Branch/service: Luxembourg Army
- Rank: Major
- Battles/wars: World War 2: Invasion of Luxembourg

Guillaume Konsbruck (3 September 1909 – 3 October 1983) was a Luxembourgish military officer, politician, and manager of the steel company Arbed.

== Early life ==
Guillame Konsbruck was born on 3 September 1909. He studied at the cavalry branch of the Saint-Cyr Military Academy from 1931 to 1933, subsequently joining the Luxembourg Army. By 1940 he held the rank of captain and acted as an aide to Prince Felix.

== World War II ==
On 10 May 1940 Germany invaded Luxembourg. Konsbruck accompanied Hereditary Grand Duke Jean, Princess Marie Gabrielle, and Princess Alix as they fled to France. Konsbruck served as aide de camp to Grand Duchess Charlotte during her exile in World War II. After arriving in Bordeaux, Guillaume Konsbruck and his family were granted transit visas from the Portuguese consul Aristides de Sousa Mendes, in June 1940. They travelled to Portugal along with the rest of the government and the Grand Ducal Family of Luxembourg. Guillaume, along with his wife Nelly, and their sons Guy and Carlo, followed the Grand Ducal family through Coimbra and Lisbon. They settled at Praia das Maçãs after the Grand Ducal family moved to Cascais. By August, the entire entourage had moved to Monte Estoril and the Konsbruck family stayed at Chalet Posser de Andrade with the Grand Ducal family. They left Portugal with the Grand Duchess Charlotte and the Dowager Grand Duchess Anne Marie on 3 October 1940 aboard the Pan Am Yankee Clipper headed for New York City.

As a major he returned to Luxembourg late in the afternoon of 12 September 1944. Representing Prime Minister Pierre Dupong, he inspected the Grand Ducal Palace and several government buildings before taking part in conferences with Allied leaders in the country. He welcomed the Grand Duchess at the border upon her return to the country on 17 April 1945.

== Post-war career ==
After the war Konsbruck became involved in creating an official orthography for the Luxembourgish language. On 29 August 1946 Konsbruck was appointed via Grand Ducal Decree to be Minister of Supply and Economic Affairs.

== Awards ==
He was made a Commander of the Order of the Oak Crown on 22 January 1951, a Grand Officer of the House Order of Orange on 19 June 1952 and a Grand Officer in the Order of Orange-Nassau on 9 November 1973.

== See also ==
- Émile Speller
