= Robert Stumper =

Luxembourgish footballer, chemist and myrmecologist

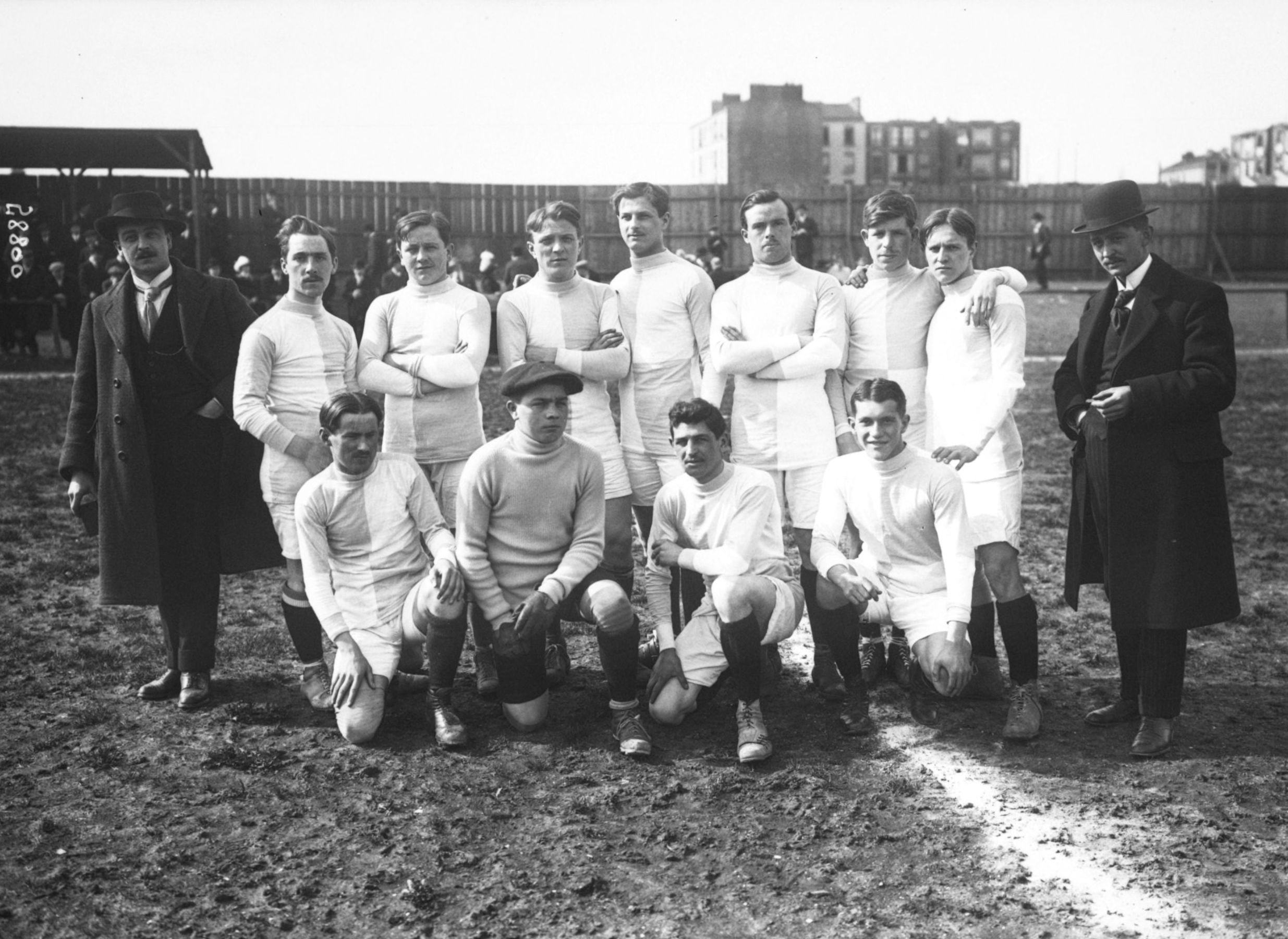
The Luxembourg national team on 20 April 1913; Stumper is second left in the front row.

Nicolas Camille Robert Stümper (21 January 1895 – 15 April 1977), commonly known as Robert Stumper, was a Luxembourgish chemist and myrmecologist. In his youth he played football for SC Luxembourg and made one appearance for the national team in 1913. His work on the parasitic Tetramorium inquilinum ant is particularly important as his studies of three colonies provide the basis of much of the current knowledge of the species. His works in chemistry included papers relating to iron. Stumper was detained by the Nazis during the Second World War and in its aftermath was appointed to Luxembourg's Consultative Assembly.

== Football ==
Stumper was born in Grevenmacher in eastern Luxembourg on 21 January 1895. He played football for SC Luxembourg. On 20 April 1913 he was called up to play his only game for the Luxembourg national football team as a goalkeeper. At the age of 18 years, 2 months and 30 days Stumper became the youngest player to appear for the national team, a record he held until 14 January 1922. The game, a friendly against France played at the Stade de Paris, saw Luxembourg defeated 8-0.

== Science and politics ==
Stumper was a myrmecologist. In one study he calculated that a single nest of Formica rufa ants can destroy 50,000 insects a day. He also demonstrated that honeypot ants seldom draw upon their stored reserves in cool, moist conditions. Stumper was responsible for discovering three of the first 24 known colonies of Tetramorium inquilinum ectoparasitic ants. He found them in the Upper Rhone valley whilst digging out several hundred nests of the Tetramorium caespitum pavement ant. One colony was found in a large rock that split after rolling down a slope to reveal the host ants and parasites. Much of the current knowledge of the Tetramorium inquilinum species came from the three colonies studied by Stumper. Queens of the Inquilinum species attach to the queen of the host species and are provided with nourishment by host workers. Stumper found as many as eight Inquilinum queens on one host queen.

During the Second World War Stumper was interned by the Nazis at Hinzert concentration camp in Germany. After liberation he was appointed to the Consultative Assembly by Charlotte, Grand Duchess of Luxembourg on 15 March 1945. The assembly was formed to carry out a transitional government role as the national legislature, the Chamber of Deputies could not fulfil its constitutional duties as it was unable to reach a quorum after the wartime deaths and deportations of its members.

In the post-war years Stumper was an associate of zoologist Bert Hölldobler. In addition to his studies on ants he published more than a hundred scientific papers on chemistry between 1923 and 1958, particularly in relation to iron. Stumper died on 15 April 1977 in Luxembourg City.
