= Aloyse Jacoby =

Luxembourgish Colonel

Aloys(e) Jacoby (1895–1965) was a Luxembourgish Colonel who served during World War Two.

== Early life and pre-Second World War ==
Aloyse Jacoby's parents are unknown, he was born sometime in 1895, according to his records from Dachau, apparently February 9 of that year and in Echternach the claim of location is also supported by the Forced Conscript Federation's records (Note: The Forced Conscript Federation (French: Fédération des Enrôlés de force (FEDDEF)) are a Luxembourgish research group dedicated to documenting German forced conscription in Luxembourg during World War Two.).

Records list an "Aloys Jacoby" as being a part of the "Voluntary Corps" as a Lieutenant no later that 1917 (Note: It is unclear if this is the same Aloys as the Luxembourgish Colonel).

== World War Two and later life ==
Sometime before World War Two began, Aloyse became a Captain in the Luxembourgish military, and also (the first) Chief of the General Staff, and this role was apparently post-World War Two as well (Note: Sources;).

Prior to the outbreak of hostilities on the tenth of May 1940 between Luxembourg and Germany, Aloyse was in overall command of the Volunteer Corps, which, as of September 15, 1939, had approx. 425 personnel, out of which there were roughly 6 officers, 125 of which were Auxiliaries, and the remainder (294) were on-hand forces. The Volunteer Corps was the only major military formation of Luxembourg during the war.

With the invasion underway Jacoby's object was primarily ensuring the escape of evacuees from Luxembourg.

On 11 May 1940, Jean Brasseur, a Lieutenant, took over Jacoby's position "until further notice".

Jacoby brought valuables and refugees (including Jews) to unoccupied France, particularly Mâcon, where they were provided with shelter due to his mediation.

With the Germans successful in occupying Luxembourg and now France, refugees who had expected an effective repeat of the First World War, now saw that there was effectively nowhere to go but back to Luxembourg, the German Administrative Commission in Luxembourg made it so Jacoby was given the task of repatriating all the refugees who had just fled. As a "Commissioner General" in this aim, his first task was to repatriate those who had fled from Northern Luxembourg.

Returning to Luxembourg officially became possible on 30 July 1940, the German authority still took time to come into effect, Jacoby understood his dependence upon the German authority for the supply of petroleum which permitted refugees to return, but he was still vaguely autonomous, as made evident by his manipulation of his trips to France to deliver mail and issue news to the Luxembourgish government in exile.

By September 1940, any and all refugees who wished their return to Luxembourg we're officially permitted. The German Authority attempted, futilely and in utter vain, to prevent Jews from returning but they did not succeed in large part due to the Luxembourgish police who simply refused to follow the German's orders of banning Jewish refugees and ignored any who attempted this.

He was eventually discovered and subsequently arrested in early 1941. After a stay in a Luxembourgish jail, he was deported to the Hinzert and later Dachau concentration camps in April 1945.

Sometime later, he became a Colonel, and was mentioned as being present in the post-World War Two "North Atlantic Defense Committee Communiqué" (Note: Sources;).

He died sometime in 1965.
