= Luxembourg government in exile =

Government in exile of Luxembourg during World War II

Luxembourgish government in exile Lëtzebuerger Exil Regierung (Luxembourgish) Gourvernement luxembourgeois en exile (French) Luxemburgische Exilregierung (German)
- 1940–1944
- Flag Coat of arms
- Motto: "Mir wëlle bleiwe wat mir sinn" "We want to stay what we are"
- Anthem: "Ons Heemecht" "Our Homeland" Royal anthem: "De Wilhelmus"
- Status: Government-in-exile
- Capital: Luxembourg
- Capital-in-exile: London
- Common languages: Luxembourgish, French, German
- Demonym: Luxembourger • Luxembourgish
- Consort
  - 1940–1944: Grand Duchess Charlotte
- Prime Minister
  - 1940–1944: Pierre Dupong
- History
  - Fall of Luxembourg: 10 May 1940
  - Allied liberation: 1944/1945
Preceded by	Succeeded by
Luxembourg	Luxembourg
- Today part of: Luxembourg

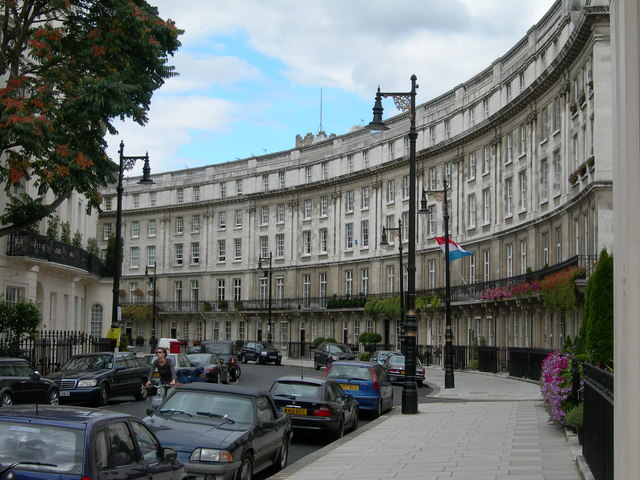
Wilton Crescent in London, where the government was based during the war, and site of the modern-day Luxembourgish embassy. The building, number 27, can be seen to the centre-right, flying the Luxembourgish flag.

The Luxembourgish government in exile (Luxembourgish: Lëtzebuerger Exil Regierung, French: Gouvernement luxembourgeois en exil, German: Luxemburgische Exilregierung) was the government in exile of Luxembourg during the Second World War. The government was based in London between 1940 and 1944, while Luxembourg was occupied by Nazi Germany. It was led by Pierre Dupong, and also included three other Ministers. The head of state, Grand Duchess Charlotte, also escaped from Luxembourg after the occupation. The government was bipartite, including two members from both the Party of the Right (PD) and the Socialist Workers' Party (LSAP).

The government was located in 27 Wilton Crescent in Belgravia, London which now serves as the modern day Luxembourgish Embassy in London. It was located only a few hundred metres from the Belgian government in exile in Eaton Square.

== Background ==
On 10 May 1940, neutral Luxembourg was invaded by German troops as part of a wider attack on France. The same day, the Luxembourgish government, then under the Dupong-Krier Ministry, fled the country.

The outbreak of World War II on 1 September 1939 and the ensuing Phoney War had made it possible to predict a violation of Luxembourgish neutrality, so that the government decided it would depart into exile if the country was completely occupied by German forces. While the departure of the Grand Duchess and her ministers was the result of a decision taken in advance, it was not well-prepared. The government left no written declaration explaining the reasons for its departure to a distressed population, nor any instructions for the commission charged with provisionally administering the country. The advance of German troops was so rapid that one of the ministers, Nicolas Margue, was captured by the invaders. So as not to compromise the action of his colleagues, he informed the Chamber of Deputies that due to his circumstances, he felt obliged to provisionally renounce the exercise of his functions as minister. The government established itself first in Paris, then when a French defeat was imminent, fled to Portugal.

In the meantime, in Luxembourg, an Administrative Commission composed of government counsellors and headed by Albert Wehrer started operating. It tried to fill the vacuum left by the departure of the executive, and tried to come to an arrangement with the German military authorities. The Administrative Commission and the Chamber of Deputies even appealed to the Grand Duchess, asking her to return to Luxembourg. The Luxembourgish authorities remaining in the country had not yet abandoned the hope that in the new European order dominated by Nazi Germany, the Grand Duchy could retain its independence. In Lisbon, the month of July passed in uncertainty. While Dupong and the Grand Duchess leaned towards returning, Bech was reluctant. Germany's de facto annexation of Luxembourg put an end to hesitations. On 29 July 1940, Gustav Simon, Gauleiter of the Gau Koblenz-Trier, was named Chef der Zivilverwaltung in Luxembourg. All the institutions of the Luxembourgish state were abolished. The Grand Duchess and the government decided to definitively join the Allied side, and opted for a dual seat. The Grand Ducal family, Pierre Dupong and for a time, Victor Bodson, established themselves in Montréal, Canada, a Francophone city close to the United States. Joseph Bech and Pierre Krier remained in London, which was the seat of several other governments in exile, such as those of Belgium and the Netherlands.

== Exile to London ==
The government first fled to Paris, Lisbon and then the United Kingdom. While the Government established itself in Wilton Crescent in London, the Grand Duchess and her family moved to Francophone Montreal in Canada. The government in exile was vocal in stressing the Luxembourgish cause in newspapers in Allied countries and succeeded in obtaining Luxembourgish language broadcasts to the occupied country on BBC radio. The government encouraged the foundation of the Luxembourg Society in London in 1942.

=== Policies ===
In 1944, the government in exile signed the London Customs Convention with the Belgian and Dutch governments, laying the foundation for the Benelux Economic Union and also signed into the Bretton Woods system of currency controls.

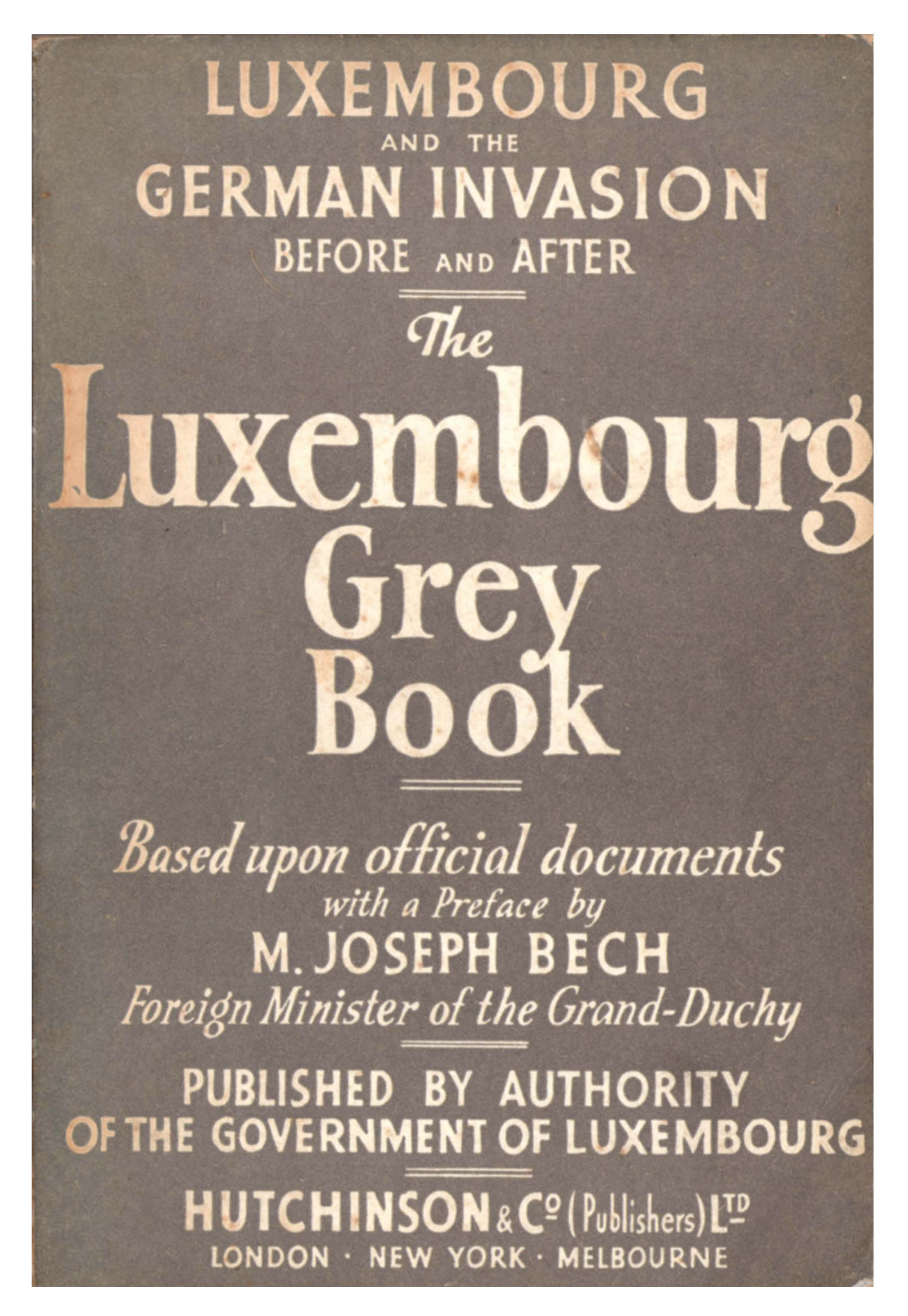
The Luxembourg Grey Book (1942) published on behalf of the government to inform the Allied public about Luxembourg's role in the conflict.

The first reaction of the government in exile was to protest against the German violation of its independence and neutrality and appealing for French and British help. In choosing to go into exile, first in France and later in Britain and Canada, the Luxembourgish government abandoned its traditional policy of neutrality and joined the camp of those fighting the Axis powers. Despite its small size, Luxembourg was a party to the great agreements which brought together the Allied war effort and laid foundations for the post-war period. Thus, Luxembourg signed the Declaration of St James's Palace (12 June 1941) and the Declaration by United Nations (Washington, 1 January 1942), adhered to the Atlantic Charter (14 August 1941) and participated in the Bretton Woods Conference (July 1944) which put in place a new international monetary system.

The government had drawn lessons from the First World War, and directed all diplomatic efforts towards the goals of assuring the country's survival, preventing a "Luxembourg Question" from arising after the war, and having Luxembourg recognised as a full member of the Allies despite its weak military capability. In 1944, the government succeeded in furnishing a modest contribution to the Allied military effort by creating the Luxembourg Battery, composed of Luxembourgish volunteers and integrated in the Belgian Brigade Piron. During the course of the war, the government developed a policy of very active communication intended to make the Luxembourgish voice heard within the United Nations and to support the morale of the Luxembourgish population. It published The Luxembourg Grey Book, placed articles in the English-speaking press, and obtained Luxembourgish-language broadcasts from the BBC. Luxembourg's cause also benefited greatly from the Grand Duchess's prestige with US President Franklin D. Roosevelt. The Grand Ducal family was invited to the White House several times during their exile.

The war brought Belgium and Luxembourg closer together. The Belgium–Luxembourg Economic Union (UEBL) had undergone several crises between the wars. Henceforth, faced with a common danger, strong economic and monetary links were created again between the two countries. The Luxembourg state lacked any funds since its gold reserves, entrusted to the National Bank of Belgium in 1938–1939, had fallen into German hands. Belgium therefore used its resources from the Congo to provide the Luxembourgish government with financial assistance. When the Liberation was announced, the two governments prepared to re-establish the UEBL. On 31 August 1944 in London, they agreed to an additional clause which restored parity of the Belgian franc and the Luxembourgish franc. The two partners even aimed to increase their ties by signing the Benelux Treaty with the Netherlands, on 5 September 1944.

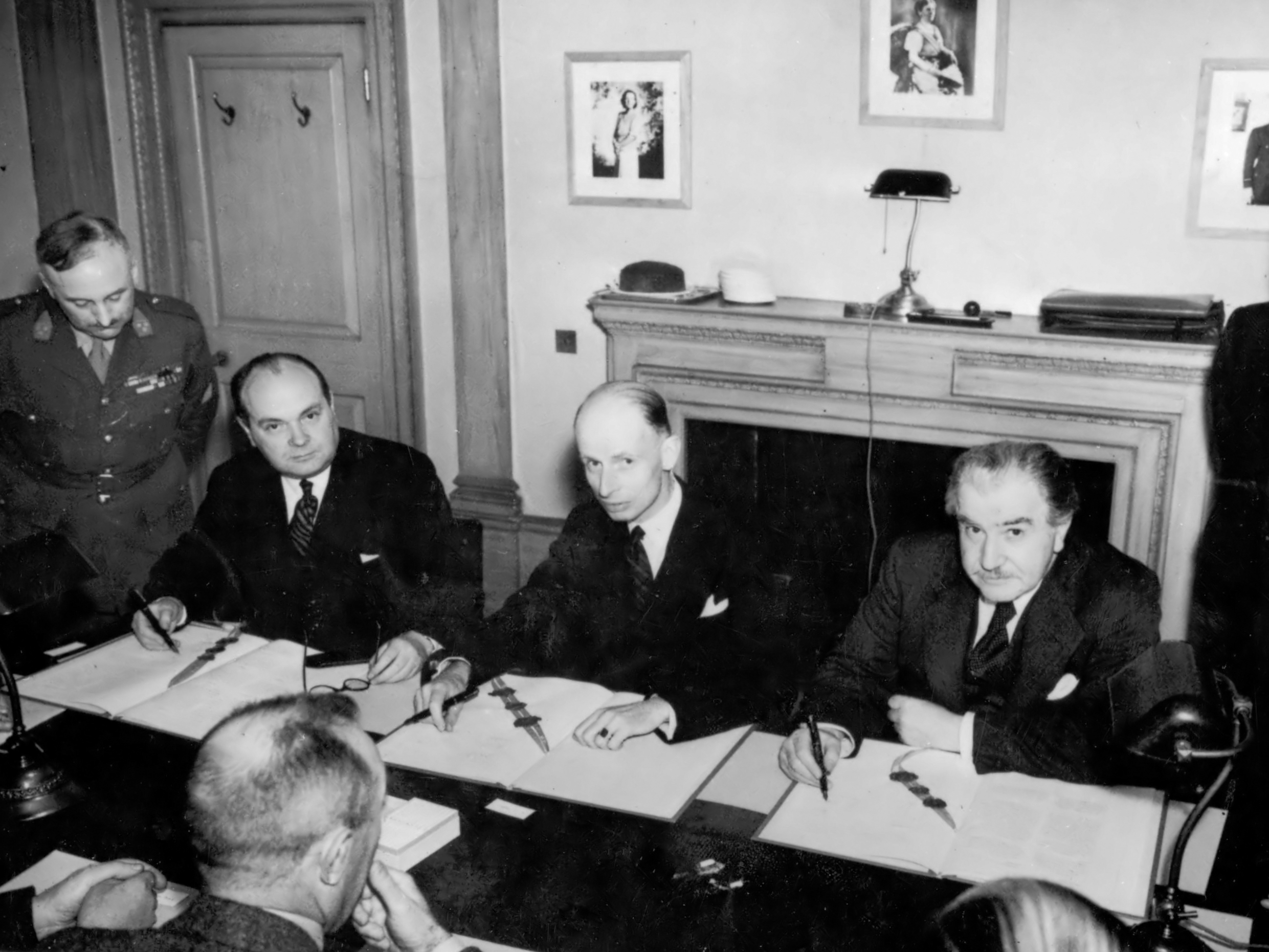
Signature of the Benelux Monetary Convention of 21 October 1943

A major problem for the government-in-exile was the influx of Luxembourgish refugees who had managed to reach Britain. After the war was over, there were numerous critics who accused the government of not having done enough to rescue them or help them reach the British Isles, such as those who remained trapped in the South of France or in camps in Spain.

The exile was the government's chance to reflect on the future of Luxembourgish society. It was mostly the two socialist ministers, who felt left out from the foreign policy led by Bech and Dupong, who tried to find solutions for the domestic problems of the post-war period. Victor Bodson prepared judicial reforms with a view to prosecuting and punishing collaborators. Pierre Krier made numerous contacts among British trade unionists and Labour Party politicians. Krier, the Minister of Work and Social Security became familiar with the idea of the welfare state, and was inspired by the Beveridge Report. Dreaming of a "new Luxembourg", he developed plans to introduce social security for everyone. Even though various tensions in the government-in-exile were reminiscent of the ideological battles of the inter-war period, all its members wanted to avoid another social and political crisis like that which had followed the First World War.

=== Free Luxembourgish forces ===
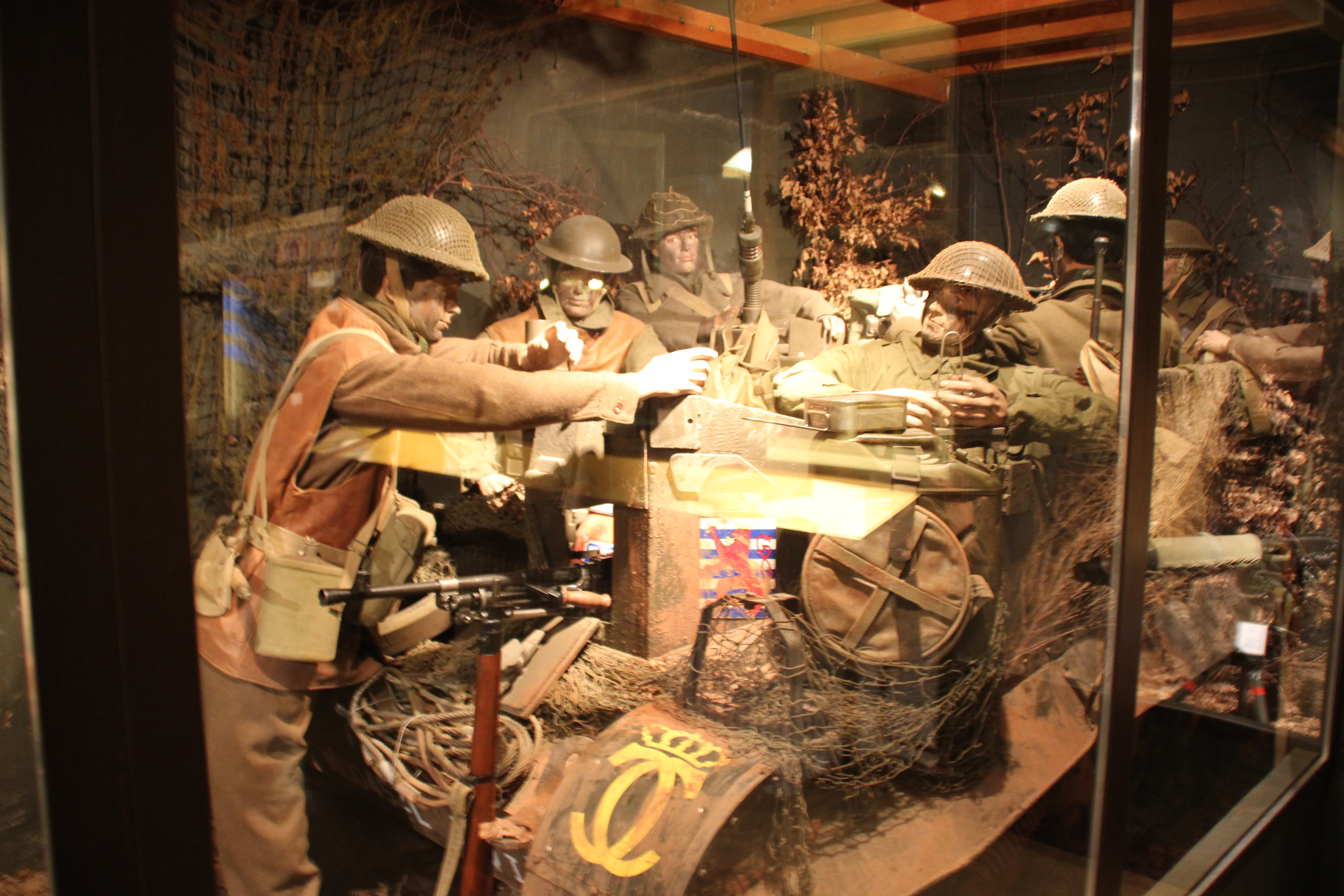
Diorama showing Free Luxembourgish soldiers with a Bren Carrier during World War II

Luxembourgish military involvement could play only a "symbolic role" for the Allied cause. In March 1944, the first all-Luxembourgish unit was created in England. The unit, a gun battery, operated four 25 pounder guns, which they christened Elisabeth, Marie Adelaide, Marie Gabriele and Alix after the Grand duchess' daughters. The unit formed part of C Troop, 1st Belgian Field Artillery Battery of the 1st Belgian Infantry Brigade, which was nicknamed the "Brigade Piron" after its commander Jean-Baptiste Piron. The battery numbered some 80 men. The battery landed in Normandy with rest of the Brigade Piron on 6 August 1944 and served in the Battle of Normandy and was involved in the Liberation of Brussels on 4 September 1944.

Numerous Luxembourgers fought in other Allied armies, many individually within other Allied units such as the Free French section of No. 4 Commando. Prince Jean, son of the Grand Duchess and future Grand Duke, served in the Irish Guards from 1942.

Major Guillaume Konsbruck served as aide de camp to the Grand Duchess during her exile. The Luxembourg Battery served as the nucleus of the new Luxembourg Army once the country was liberated.

== Composition ==
Name	Ministerial Portfolios	Political party	Wartime location
Pierre Dupong	Chairman of the Government (Prime Minister); Minister of State. Minister of Finance, and of the Armed Forces.	Party of the Right	Montreal
Joseph Bech	Minister of Foreign Affairs, Viticulture, Arts and Sciences, the Interior, and Public Education.	Party of the Right	London
Pierre Krier	Minister of Work, and of Social Security	Socialist Workers' Party	London
Victor Bodson	Minister of Justice, Public Works, and Transport.	Socialist Workers' Party	Montreal

== Criticism ==
The exile government was heavily criticised by members of the Resistance and others for its lack of help towards Luxembourgers attempting to flee their occupied country during the war. Its inactivity persuaded two of its critics, the resistance members Henri Koch-Kent and Armand Schleich, the presenter of the Luxembourgish BBC programme, to found the Association des Luxembourgeois en Grande-Bretagne ("Association of Luxembourgers in Great Britain") in London, which counted 300 refugees from Luxembourg and men who had been forcibly conscripted into the German armed forces but had defected to the Allies. The Association was a bitter critic of the exile government, accusing it of treason. The government, for its part, attempted to intimidate the Association, by trying to remove Schleich as its secretary and as BBC presenter, in which it failed. Criticism was also forthcoming from the rest of the community of Luxembourgish refugees in London and in the Allied armed forces. These included Émile Krieps and Robert Winter, both officers in the Allied armed forces, and Albert Wingert, leader of the Luxembourgish Alweraje resistance group.

When the London-based government returned to Luxembourg in September 1944, the resistance organisations were highly sceptical about its legitimacy, in spite of which, it refused to resign, with the justification that it wished to wait for the return of the Grand Duchess. While these same organisations approved of the nomination of Pierre Frieden to the government in November 1944, they were vehemently against its enlargement by a further two ministers in February 1945, which lacked the approval of any legislative body.

== See also ==
- Luxembourg in World War II
- History of Luxembourg

== Bibliography ==
- Preface by Bech, Joseph (1942). The Luxembourg Grey Book: Luxembourg and the German Invasion, Before and After. London: Hutchinson & Co.
- Bernier Arcand, Philippe (2010). "L'exil québécois du gouvernement du Luxembourg" (PDF). Histoire Québec (in French). 15 (3): 19–26.
- Cohn, Ernst J. (1943). "Legislation in Exile: Luxembourg". Journal of Comparative Legislation and International Law. 25 (3/4): 40–46. JSTOR 754754.
- Dostert, Paul (March 2000). "Flucht oder nationale Rettung? 10. Mai 1940: Großherzogin Charlotte und die Regierung gehen ins Exil" (PDF). Forum (in German) (199): 44–46.
- Dostert, Paul (2011). "Les finances du gouvernement luxembourgeois en exil (1940–45)". Du Luxembourg à l'Europe. Hommages à Gilbert Trausch à l'occasion de son 80e anniversaire (in French). Luxembourg: Editions Saint-Paul. ISBN 978-2-87963-836-2.
- Haag, Emile; Krier, Emile (1987). 1940: L'Année du Dilemme – La Grande-duchesse et son Gouvernement Pendant la Deuxième Guerre Mondiale (in French). Luxembourg: RTL edition.
- Heisbourg, Georges (1991). Le Gouvernement Luxembourgeois en Exil (no.4) (in French). Luxembourg: Saint-Paul.
- Koch-Kent, Henri (1986). Vu et entendu... (in French). Vol. II: Années d'exil, 1940–1946. Luxembourg: Hermann.
- Yapou, Eliezer (2006). "Luxembourg: The Smallest Ally". Governments in Exile, 1939–1945. Jerusalem.
- Koch-Kent, Henry (1979). Putsch à Luxembourg? (2nd ed.). Luxembourg.
