= Nicolas Kremer =

Nicolas Kremer was a Luxembourgish athlete and politician.

Also known as Neckel Kremer, Nicolas Kremer was born on April 15, 1916, in Differdange, Luxembourg. During his youth, Kremer was employed as a locksmith and as a steelworker.

Additionally, Kremer became a renowned competitive cyclist. He qualified for the 1936 Summer Olympics in the Individual Road Race event for Luxembourg.

During World War II, Kremer was a senior figure in the resistance movement against the German occupation with the Luxembourgish Patriot League. After the occupation was over, he was named to the Consultative Assembly in the immediate aftermath. In 1945, Kremer was elected to the Chamber of Deputies from the South Constituency as a candidate of the Patriot and Democratic Group. He remained in the Chamber until 1948.

Kremer eventually took a position in the Transport Ministry and wrote several books. He was made an Officer of the Order of the Oak Crown in 1995 and a Commander of the Order of Merit of the Grand Duchy of Luxembourg in 1997. Kremer died on April 2, 2001, in Esch-sur-Alzette.
