= Maurice Stein (gendarme) =

Maurice Stein (October 1, 1884, Berg - March 7, 1957) was a Luxembourgish Captain (honorary major) who headed the Gendarme and the Volunteer Corps. He was married to Georgette Schulze.

== Biography ==
Stein began in the lower ranks of the Volunteer Corps of Luxembourg, which he entered on the 7 of August 1905, before being promoted to Lieutenant on October 18, 1909. On the 31 of January 1915, Maurice was attached to the Gendarme, and placed issued the position of military district commander for Diekirch.

Stein oversaw the Gendarmes at the time of the German invasion of Luxembourg in 1940. Prior to the outbreak of hostilities, a series of nine radio outposts were established along the German border, each manned by gendarmes, with a central radio receiver in Captain Stein's official office near the volunteers' Saint-Esprit Barracks in the capital.
