= German invasion of Luxembourg =

World War II military campaign in 1940

- Part of the German invasion of France and the Low Countries in World War II and the Battle of France
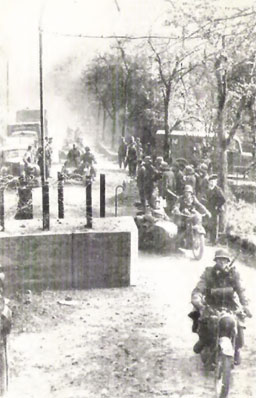
- German troops crossing into Luxembourg through the Schuster Line
Date	10 May 1940
Location	Luxembourg
Result	German victory: Remaining Luxembourg Officials arrested by the Gestapo; Luxembourg Government flees and reformed into Government in exile
Territorial changes	Luxembourg occupied by Nazi Germany: Military Administration of Luxembourg formed

Belligerents
Luxembourg; France; Air Support By: United Kingdom	Germany

Commanders and leaders
(Luxembourg) Charlotte (Luxembourg) Pierre Dupong; Émile Speller (surrendered); Robert Petiet (United Kingdom) Arthur Barratt	(Nazi Germany) Heinz Guderian

Units involved
3rd Light Cavalry Division; 1st Spahi Brigade (Luxembourg) Grand Duchy Army (Luxembourg) Grand Ducal Gendarmerie (United Kingdom) 226th Squadron	(Nazi Germany) 1st Panzer Division (Nazi Germany) 2nd Panzer Division (Nazi Germany) 10th Panzer Division

Strength
Luxembourg: 425 soldiers 246 gendarmes France: 18,000 soldiers United Kingdom: No. 226 Sqdn. RAF	50,000 soldiers 600 tanks

Casualties and losses
Luxembourg: 7 wounded 76 captured France: 5 killed United Kingdom: 1 killed 2 captured 1 aircraft destroyed	36 killed 52 wounded

The German invasion of Luxembourg was part of Case Yellow (German: Fall Gelb), the German invasion of the Low Countries—Belgium, Luxembourg and the Netherlands—and France during World War II. The battle began on 10 May 1940 and lasted just one day. Facing only light resistance, German troops quickly occupied Luxembourg. The Luxembourgish government, and Grand Duchess Charlotte, managed to escape the country and a government-in-exile was created in London.

== Background ==
On 1 September 1939 Germany invaded Poland, initiating World War II. This put Luxembourg's Grand Ducal government in a delicate situation. On one hand, the population's sympathies lay with the UK and France; on the other hand, due to the country's policy of neutrality since the Treaty of London in 1867, the government adopted a careful non-belligerent stance towards its neighbours. In accordance with the treaty's restrictions, the only military force Luxembourg maintained was its small Volunteer Corps under Captain Aloyse Jacoby, reinforced by the Grand Ducal Gendarmerie under Captain Maurice Stein. Together they formed the Corps des Gendarmes et Volontaires under Major-Commandant Émile Speller. (Note: The Corps des Gendarmes et Volontaires was under the ceremonial command of Prince Felix, but actual control of the unit rested with Major Speller.)

At noon on 1 September Radio Luxembourg announced that in order for the country to remain unambiguously neutral it would cease broadcasting. Exceptions were a daily 20 minute-long message at midday and in the evening reserved for government announcements. For the rest of the month, the government supplied full transcripts of its broadcasts to the foreign legations in the country. Later that day several German stations posed as Radio Luxembourg by broadcasting in the Luxembourgish wavelength, making, in the opinion of United States Chargé d'Affaires George Platt Waller, "grossly unneutral announcements". On the evening of 21 September, the Grand Ducal government suspended all broadcasts pending the resolution of the war.

On 14 September the volunteer corps was bolstered by the addition of a 125-strong auxiliary unit. German military manoeuvres and river traffic made the population increasingly nervous, so in the spring of 1940 fortifications were erected along the borders with Germany and France. The so-called Schuster Line, named after its chief constructor, consisted of 41 sets of concrete blocks and iron gates; 18 bridgeblocks on the German border, 18 roadblocks on the German border, and five roadblocks on the French border. Since the Corps des Gendarmes et Volontaires had no pioneer unit, construction fell to the responsibility of civilian engineers, while technical advice was sought from the French, who took great interest in the line's establishment. A series of nine radio outposts were established along the German border, each manned by gendarmes, with a central radio receiver in Captain Stein's official office near the volunteers' Saint-Esprit Barracks in the capital. On 4 January 1940, the Cabinet convened under Grand Duchess Charlotte and outlined steps to be taken in the event of a German invasion. Charlotte decided that if possible she and the government would flee abroad in the event of an attack to advocate for the country's sovereignty. During World War I, her elder sister and then-Grand Duchess Marie-Adélaïde had elected to stay during Germany's occupation of the country, bringing the monarchy into disrepute; Charlotte wanted to avoid such problems. The government moved some of the country's gold reserves to Belgium, and began stockpiling funds in its Brussels and Paris legations in the event it was forced to flee due to German attack. The Paris legation was also given a sealed envelope detailing a formal request of military assistance from the French government in case communications were cut-off in an invasion.

After several false alarms in the spring of 1940, the probability of a military conflict between Germany and France grew. Germany stopped the export of coke for the Luxembourgish steel industry. Abwehr agents under Oskar Reile infiltrated the country, posing as tourists. This was observed by Captain Fernand Archen, an undercover senior French intelligence officer in Luxembourg City, posing as a wine merchant. (Note: Archen had been operating in Luxembourg since May 1936.) He reported his findings to his superiors at Longwy on 7 May, understanding that the agents were to be used to seize key bridges over the Sauer, Moselle and Our rivers. Luxembourg authorities also took notice, and Captain Stein worked to stop the Germans' activities. On 3 March, the French Third Army was ordered to occupy Luxembourg in the event of a German attack.

== Prelude ==
On the evening of 8 May, the Grand Ducal Government ordered for the first time that all doors of the Schuster Line be closed at 11:00 and remain so regardless of circumstance until 06:00 the following morning. Throughout the day Luxembourgish authorities witnessed much less activity on the far side of the border and made no reports of tank or machine gun movements. On the afternoon of 9 May, a French intelligence officer stationed in Clervaux witnessed German troops preparing pontoon bridges in the Sauer. He attempted in vain to contact Captain Archen, and resorted to making a direct phone call to his superiors at Longwy. Also that day a German national working in Luxembourg as a gardener and a member of the German fifth column warned his Luxembourgish employer, Carlo Tuck, that an invasion was impending. Tuck passed the warning on to government officials. Late that evening, the Grand Ducal government came into possession of a document from a German divisional command. Dated 23 April 1940, it detailed the division's chief of staff's orders to various units to occupy strategic points within Luxembourg. The Grand Ducal government put all border posts and Grand Ducal Gendarmerie stations on full alert. In Luxembourg City, gendarmes mobilised to defend public buildings and dispatched vehicle patrols to arrest fifth columnists. The economic councillor and the chancellor of the German legation were detained for questioning regarding allegations that they had used legation cars to organise subversive activities within the country. Since an invasion had not yet occurred they still enjoyed diplomatic privilege and the police were forced to release them. One group of fifth columnists was arrested while attempting to reach the legation. Meanwhile, Captain Archen had received his subordinate's report, but by that point, he had been told by informants in the Gendarmerie that shots had been exchanged with German operatives at a remote farm near the Moselle. At 11:45 on 9 May he radioed Longwy: "Reports of important German troop movements on the German-Luxembourg frontier." Throughout the night his messages became more and more frantic. Two Luxembourgish customs officials at Wormeldange heard horses and soldiers across the Moselle, but were unable to make out the Germans' activities due to heavy fog.

At around midnight, Captain Stein, Minister of Justice Victor Bodson, and Police Commissioner Joseph Michel Weis held an emergency meeting. Bodson requested that the capital be reinforced by gendarmes from the south, and told Weis to forward this information to the capital's district commissioner to give the necessary orders. Weis later tried to contact the district commissioner by phone, but failed to reach him; reinforcements never came. A short time later the gendarmes at Diekirch were ordered to patrol the local railway bridge and be wary of unfamiliar persons. Luxembourgish authorities received the first reports of exchanged fire at around 02:00 on 10 May when two gendarmes were ambushed near the German border by plainclothes agents. (Note: The Belgian Press Association reported in 1941 that one of these gendarmes was killed and the other severely wounded, through a 1948 war memorial commemoration printed in the Grand Duché de Luxembourg Ministére D'État Bulletin D'Information stated that no gendarmes or soldiers were killed during the invasion.) The Germans retreated to the Fels mill near Grevenmacher and around 20 soldiers who volunteered were dispatched to arrest them. The government then ordered all steel doors along the border locked. At 02:15 soldiers stationed in Bous were attacked by Germans in civilian clothes. One soldier was badly injured, as was one German who was detained. Shortly thereafter a gendarmerie lieutenant and his chauffeur were ambushed and exchanged fire with German-speaking cyclists; no one was hurt. Fifth columnists successfully severed the telephone wires between the capital and the border posts, forcing the gendarmes to communicate via shortwave radio. German agents gradually seized the radio stations; the last post to fall, in Wasserbillig, transmitted until the Germans breached the operating room.

The steel doors of the Schuster Line were ordered closed on 10 May 1940 at 03:15, following reports of movement of German troops on the east side of the border rivers Our, Sauer, and Moselle. At 03:30 Luxembourgish authorities released interned French pilots and German deserters. The Royal Family was evacuated from its residence in Colmar-Berg to the Grand Ducal palace in Luxembourg City. Around 30 minutes later, at dawn, German planes were spotted flying over Luxembourg City towards Belgium.

== Invasion ==
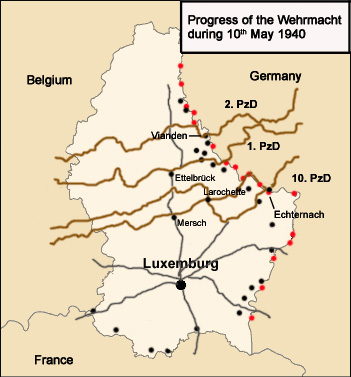
Map showing the German invasion routes into Luxembourg

The German invasion began at 04:35 when the 1st, 2nd, and 10th Panzer Divisions crossed the border at Wallendorf-Pont, Vianden, and Echternach respectively. Wooden ramps were used to cross over the Schuster Line's tank traps. Fire was exchanged, but the Germans did not encounter any significant resistance except for some bridges destroyed and some land mines since the majority of the Luxembourgish Volunteer Corps stayed in their barracks. The border was defended only by soldiers who had volunteered for guard duty and gendarmes. A handful of Germans secured the Moselle bridge at Wormeldange and captured the two customs officers there, who had demanded that they halt but refrained from opening fire. The partly demolished bridge over the Sauer at Echternach was quickly repaired by engineers of the Großdeutschland regiment, allowing the passage of the 10th Panzer Division. Planes flew overhead, heading for Belgium and France, though some stopped and landed troops within the country.

Captain Archen repeatedly alerted his superiors at Longwy of the invasion, but his reports never reached the 3rd Army at Metz. General Charles Condé, the army's commander, was unclear about the situation and at 05:30 dispatched aerial reconnaissance units to investigate. At 06:00 the French 3rd Light Cavalry Division was ordered to intervene.

Telephone and radio messages from the border posts to the Gendarmerie and Volunteer Corps headquarters informed the Luxembourgish government and Grand Ducal court of the invasion. Foreign Minister Joseph Bech, in the presence of Prime Minister Pierre Dupong, attempted to contact the German ambassador at the legation and at his private residence, but they were informed that he was present at neither. At 06:30 the majority of the government, including Dupong and Bech, evacuated the capital by motorcade to the border town of Esch. Bodson stayed behind at the Saint-Esprit Barracks to monitor the situation. In Esch a group of 125 German special operations troops had landed by Fieseler Storch, with orders to hold the area until the main invasion force arrived. A gendarme confronted the soldiers and asked that they leave, but he was taken prisoner. The government motorcade encountered a roadblock at a crossroads manned by German units, and was forced to detour through the countryside to avoid capture. French Ambassador Jean Tripier followed the government party but was stopped by the Germans and forced to return to the capital. Belgian Ambassador Kervyn de Meerendré was also stopped by German soldiers at the border and ordered to turn back, as was the Luxembourgish Minister of Education, Nicolas Margue, who had attempted to escape by taxi. Bodson later fled the capital and, having learned many of the secondary roads by memory, was able to avoid German roadblocks and navigate his way to France.

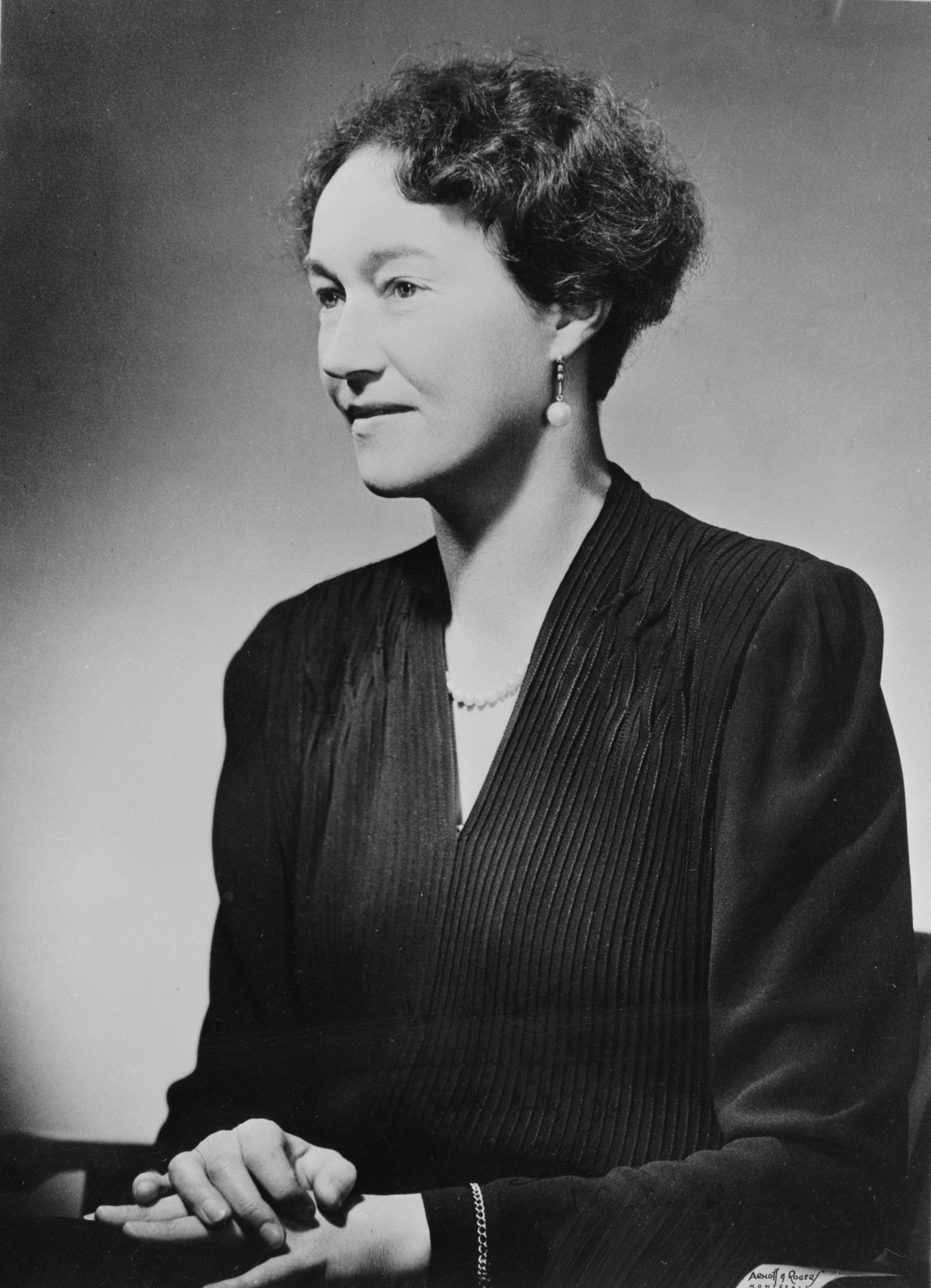
Charlotte, Grand Duchess of Luxembourg, pictured in 1942, fled into France with Luxembourg's government.

Following consultation with her ministers, Grand Duchess Charlotte decided to abandon the palace. Accompanied by her husband, Prince Felix, her mother, Dowager Grand Duchess Marie Anne, and members of the Grand-Ducal suite, she departed for the border village of Redange. After a brief stop, her party crossed the border at 07:45. Meanwhile, Hereditary Grand Duke Jean and two of his sisters, accompanied by an aide-de-camp, Guillaume Konsbruck, were to wait at the border for confirmation of occupation. Around 08:00 the prime minister and his entourage passed over the border before making contact with French troops at Longlaville. Last minute telephone calls with Luxembourg City revealed the capital to be completely surrounded.

Charlotte's party was able to link up with the government motorcade at Longwy. Meanwhile, Jean's party's car was strafed by a German aircraft while stopped at a cafe. Near Esch, the group was delayed by a German roadblock, and they escaped when their chauffeur drove straight through the soldiers. The party ultimately joined Charlotte and the Grand Ducal government at Sainte-Menehould.

At 08:00, elements of the French 3rd Light Cavalry Division under General Petiet, supported by the 1st Spahi Brigade under Colonel Jouffault and the 2nd company of the 5th Armoured Battalion, crossed the southern border to conduct a probe of German forces; these units later retreated behind the Maginot Line. Five Spahis were killed. British Air Marshal Arthur Barratt, impatient with the reluctance of the French Air Force to conduct air strikes, ordered a flight of Fairey Battle bombers from the 226 Squadron to attack German tank columns. They went unescorted and encountered heavy anti-aircraft fire. Most were damaged by flak but managed to escape. One received a direct hit and crashed near Bettendorf. German soldiers pulled the three injured crew from the burning wreckage, one of whom later died in a local hospital.

The Grand Ducal Gendarmerie resisted the German troops, but to little avail; the capital city was occupied before noon. The Gendarmerie chain of command in the south was thrown into disarray by the influx of refugees and the arrival of German and French troops. Most gendarmes escorted refugees over the border, while some abandoned their posts and fled to France. Total Luxembourgish casualties amounted to six gendarmes and one soldier wounded, while 22 soldiers (six officers and 16 non-commissioned officers) and 54 gendarmes were captured.

By the evening of 10 May 1940, most of the country, with the exception of the south, was occupied by German forces. More than 90,000 civilians fled from the canton of Esch-sur-Alzette as a consequence of the advance. 47,000 evacuated to France, joining the Exodus of refugees from Belgium and Northern France. Another 45,000 poured into the central and northern part of Luxembourg.

== Aftermath ==
On 11 May the Grand Ducal government reached Paris and installed itself in the Luxembourg legation. Fearing German aerial attack and finding the small facilities unsuitable, the government moved further south, first to Fontainebleau, and then Poitiers. It later moved to Portugal and the United Kingdom, before finally settling in Canada for the duration of the war. In exile, Charlotte became an important symbol of national unity. Her eldest son and heir, Jean, volunteered for the British Army in 1942. The only official representative left behind was Albert Wehrer, head of the Ministry of State Affairs, as well as the 41 deputies.

By the end of May, Wehrer and several high ranking functionaries established a provisional "Administrative Commission" to govern Luxembourg in lieu of the Grand Ducal family and the other ministers. Wehrer retained the Ministry of State Affairs and assumed responsibility for Foreign Relations and Justice; Jean Metzdorf held the portfolios for Interior, Transportation, and Public Works; Joseph Carmes managed Finance, Labour, and Public Health; Louis Simmer oversaw Education, and Mathias Pütz directed Agriculture, Viticulture, Commerce, and Industry.

In the days after the invasion Luxembourgish officers walked about the capital freely, though the regular soldiers were mostly confined to their barracks. Colonel Speller was briefly incarcerated by the Gestapo, though he was later released under close supervision.
