= Grand Ducal Gendarmerie (Luxembourg) =

- Active: 3 February 1733 - 1 January 2000 (266 years, 10 months and 29 days)
- Disbanded: 1 January 2000 (reformed into Royal Police)
- Country: Luxembourg
- Allegiance: Grand Duke of Luxembourg
- Role: Gendarmerie
- Engagements: World War II: Invasion of Luxembourg

The Grand Ducal Gendarmerie (French: Gendarmerie Grand-Ducale; Luxembourgish: Groussherzoglech Gendarmerie) was the national Gendarmerie force of the Grand Duchy of Luxembourg, carrying both civil and military duties. It merged on 1 January 2000, with local police forces under state authority to form the Grand Ducal Police (Groussherzoglech Police; Police Grand-Ducale), the country's current national police force.

== History ==
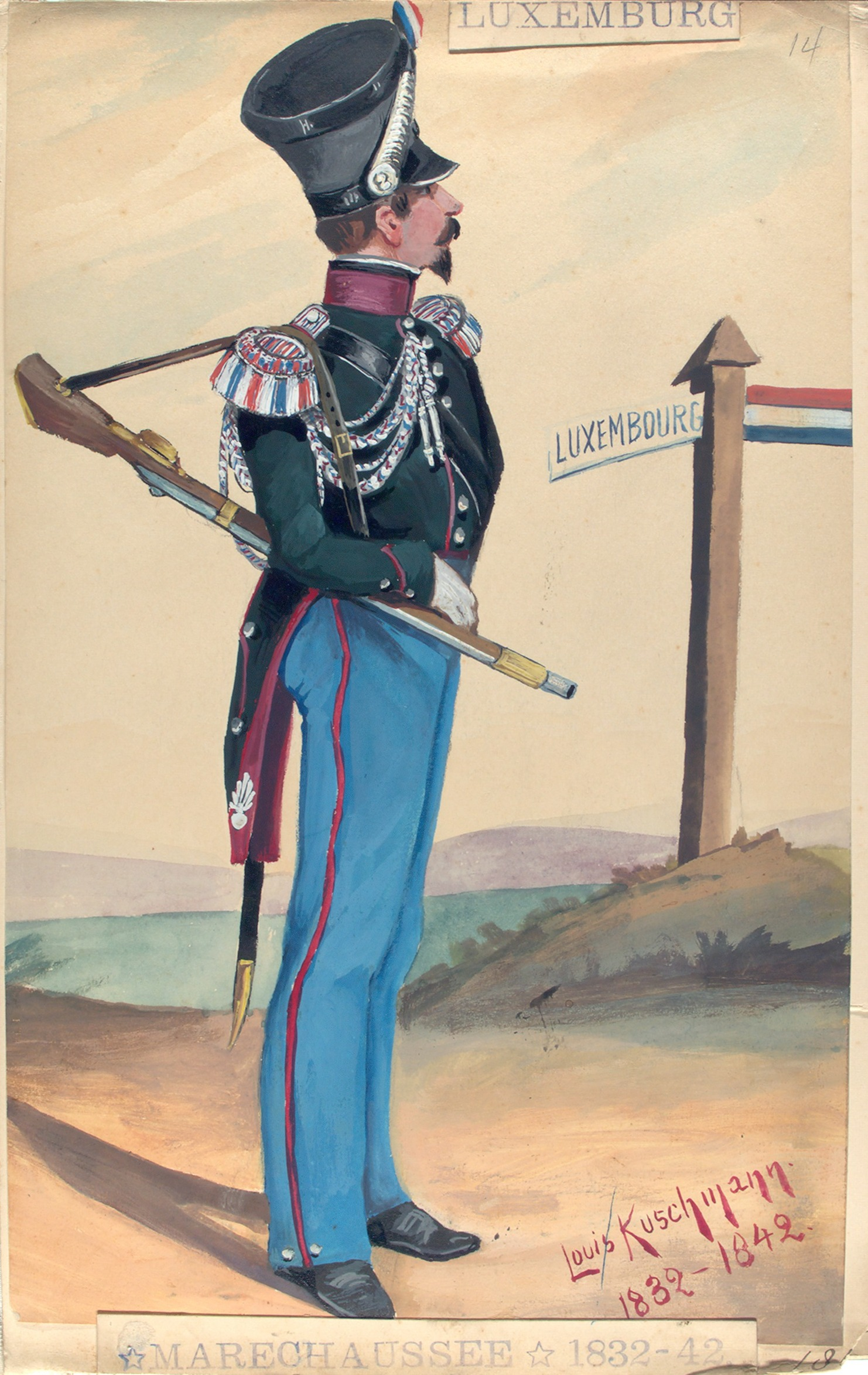
Uniform of a Royal Marechaussee in Luxembourg, 1832-42

=== Formation ===
The Grand Ducal Gendarmerie was formed on 3 February 1733, "to fight the plague of the vagrants and people without consent".

=== French rule and transition ===
Luxembourg was incorporated into France as the Département des Forêts from 1795 to 1813 and the "Gendarmerie Nationale" system was applied. The law of the "28 Germinal, Year VI", was to remain the basis of the Luxembourgish Gendarmerie. In 1805, the name of the "National Gendarmerie" was changed to "Imperial Gendarmerie".

Transitionally, after Napoleon's defeat at Leipzig in 1813, Luxembourg became part of the province of Middle-Rhine, administered by Prussia. The Gendarmerie being in complete disarray, the ordinance of 18 February 1814 replaced it with a government militia, with 3 officers and 106 sub-officers and soldiers.

=== Kingdom of the Netherlands ===
From 1815 to 1830, Luxembourg was ruled by the King of the Netherlands, as was Belgium. The law of 1814, creating a Corps de Maréchaussée (Constabulary Corps) in Belgium on the model of the French Gendarmerie, was extended to Luxembourg.

After the Belgian Revolution in October 1830, Luxembourg was divided into two parts: the larger part formed the Belgian Province de Luxembourg; the other became the present-day Grand Duchy of Luxembourg, still ruled by the Netherlands. Until 1839, it was controlled by the Dutch Constabulary.

Luxembourg was made an independent state (still ruled by the Dutch King in personal union) by the Treaty of London of 19 April, and the creation of a local police force was necessary. The Ordinance of 29 January 1840 created the "Grand Duchy Royal Gendarmerie". On 1842, it lost its autonomy and was incorporated into the federal contingent (of the German Confederation). Until 1877, the commandant of the Gendarmerie was under the authority of the commander of the contingent.

=== Independence ===
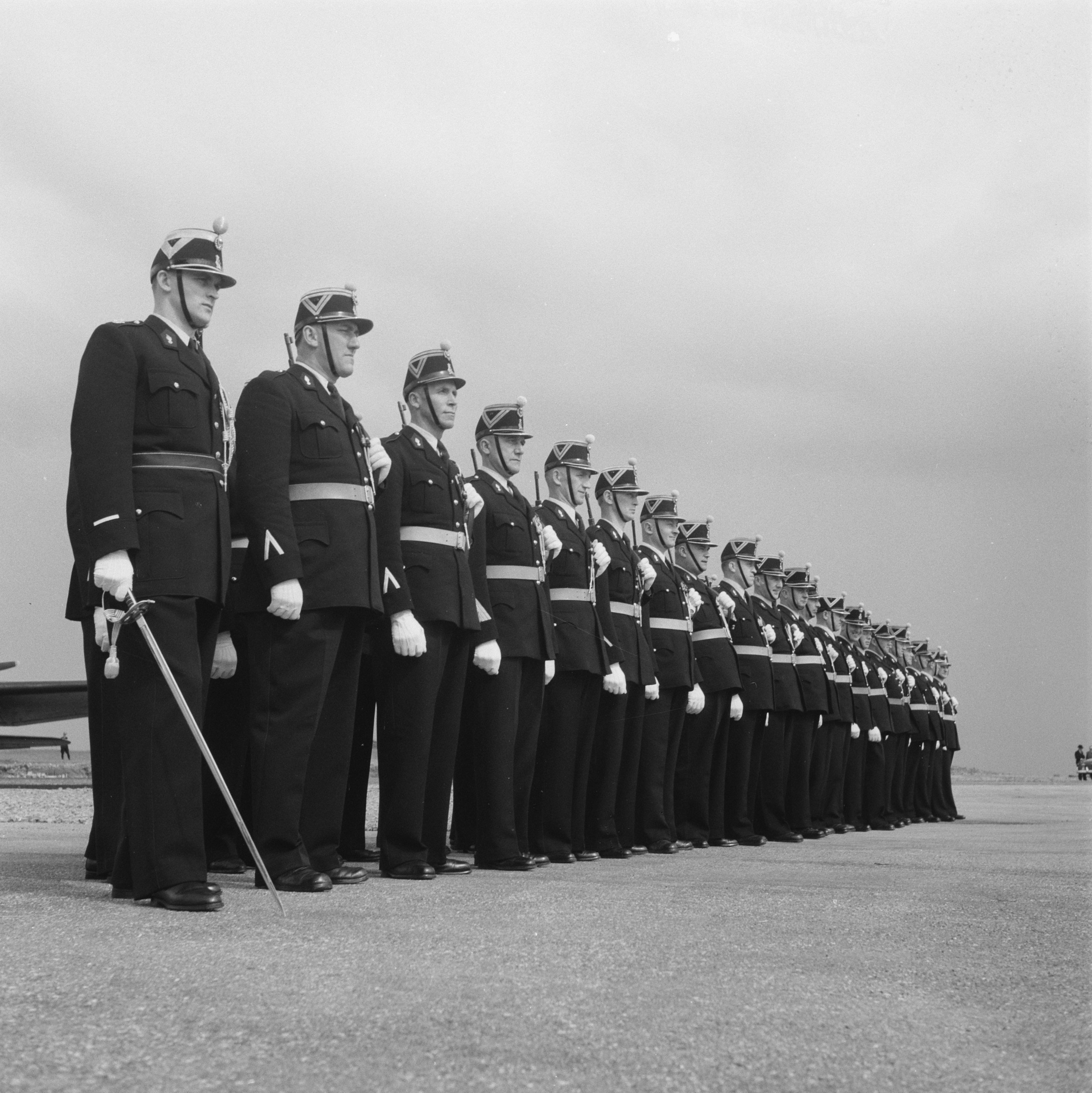
A unit of the Grand Ducal Gendarmerie at Luxembourg Airport, in 1951.

The Royal-Grand Ducal decree of 25 August 1863 changed the name into the 'Company of the Grand Duchy Royal Gendarmerie' (German: Königlich Grossherzogliche Gendarmerie Kompagnie), and increased its size to 108 men. In 1877, the Gendarmerie was separated from the contingent.

The law of 16 February 1881 created a "Force Armée", consisting of a company of gendarmes and a company of volunteers, under the command of a major. In 1902, a criminal brigade was created in the Gendarmerie, in order to help the judicial authorities in dealing with crimes and misdemeanours. This brigade was reorganised and reinforced in 1911. By grand-ducal decree of 30 November 1929, it received the name of "Service de la Sûreté Publique".

=== World War 2 and the Cold War ===
In 1940, under the German occupation, the Gendarmerie was dissolved and its members were integrated in the services of the polizei deployed into the occupied countries on Eastern Europe. During the Battle of the Bulge, 15 gendarmes assisted American troops with defending the town of Diekirch. The law of 23 July 1952 constituted the legal bases of the modern gendarmerie. It formed a part of the army as well as of the police force.

=== Current ===
The Gendarmerie was merged into the Grand Ducal Police on 1 January 2000. The gendarmerie was placed under the supervision of the Minister for the Police Force (later Minister for the Interior) for all matters related to its organisation, administration, training, and discipline. It fell under the remit of the Minister for Justice for all matters related to the maintenance of law and order and the exercise of the Criminal Investigation Department.
