= Consultative Assembly (Luxembourg) =

The Consultative Assembly (French: Assemblée Consultative) of Luxembourg was established in 1945 towards the end of World War II, when it became clear that the Chamber of Deputies could not fulfill its constitutional role. The point of the Consultative Assembly was to exercise those rights accorded to the Chamber by the constitution and laws, with the exception of legislative powers.

After World War II ended in Luxembourg on 10 September 1944, a session of the Chamber was called for 6 December 1944. Out of the 55 Deputies of the pre-war Chamber, only 25 were present. 9 Deputies had died, 10 were still in German prisons or concentration camps, and 9 were under suspicion of collaboration with the German occupation. As fewer than half the Deputies were there, there was no quorum, as demanded by the constitution. Therefore, the Chamber was not capable of functioning and taking decisions.

At the urging of the Unio'n, the umbrella organisation of the Resistance, a Consultative Assembly was established by Grand-Ducal decree on 22 February 1945, in order for the Liberation Government to be advised in its duties. The members of the Assembly were appointed by another decree on 12 March 1945. It started its activities just days after the last Luxembourgish villages, near Echternach, had been liberated.

From 20 March 1945 to 16 August 1945, 18 sessions of the Assembly took place.

== Members ==
- Joseph Artois
- Jean-Pierre Assa
- Jean-Pierre Bauer
- Nicolas Biever
- René Blum
- Paul Bohr
- Marcel Cahen
- Hubert Clement
- Emile Colling
- Othon Decker
- Gaston Diderich
- Aloyse Duhr
- Léon Flammang
- Nelly Flick
- Pierre Gansen
- Henri Gengler
- Pierre Godart
- Emile Hamilius
- Venant Hildgen
- Nicolas Jacoby
- Jean Kill
- Léon Kinsch
- Adolphe Klein
- Nicolas Kremer
- Ferdinand Kuhn
- Jean-Pierre Lenertz
- Jean Leischen
- Jean Lutgen
- Jean Maroldt
- Nicolas Mathieu
- Albert Meyers
- Denis Netgen
- François Neu
- Alphonse Osch
- Victor Prost
- Edouard Reiland
- Emile Reuter
- Alphonse Rodesch
- Emile Schaus
- Jean-Pierre Schloesser
- Tony Schmit
- Pierre Schockmel
- Joseph Schroeder
- Gustave Schuman
- Joseph Simon
- Michel Speltz
- Dominique Steichen
- Robert Stumper
- Jean-Jacques Theisen
- Dominique Urbany
- Arthur Useldinger
- Etienne Weber
- Camille Welter
- Louis Welter
- Nicolas Welter
- Victor Wilhelm
- Nicolas Wirtgen

== See also ==
- Council of State of Luxembourg
