= Pierre Krier =

Luxembourgish politician

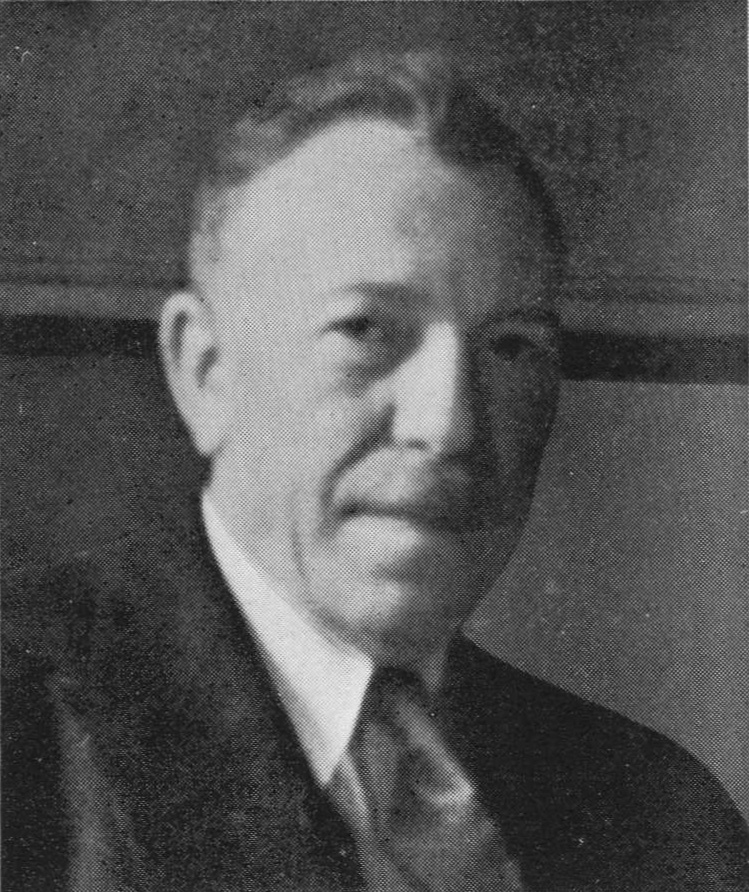
Krier c. 1945

Pierre Krier (5 March 1885 – 20 January 1947) was a Luxembourgish politician.

In 1916 he joined the weekly newspaper of the socialist party, Die Schmiede (The Forge).

In September 1916 he helped found the first socialist trade union, the Luxemburger Metallarbeiter-Verband.

On 30 May 1918 he was elected to the Chamber of Deputies for the canton Esch on the list of the Social Democrats.

From 1924 to 1937 he was on the city council of Luxembourg City.

From July 1919 onwards he was general secretary of the free trade unions and editor of their publication, Der Proletarier.

On 5 November 1937 he became Minister for Work in the Dupong-Krier Government. He kept this portfolio until his death in 1947, including his time in the government in exile.

Pierre Krier was married to the trade unionist and women's rights activist Lily Becker. He was the brother of Antoine Krier.
