= Nicolas Margue =

Luxembourgish politician (1888–1976)

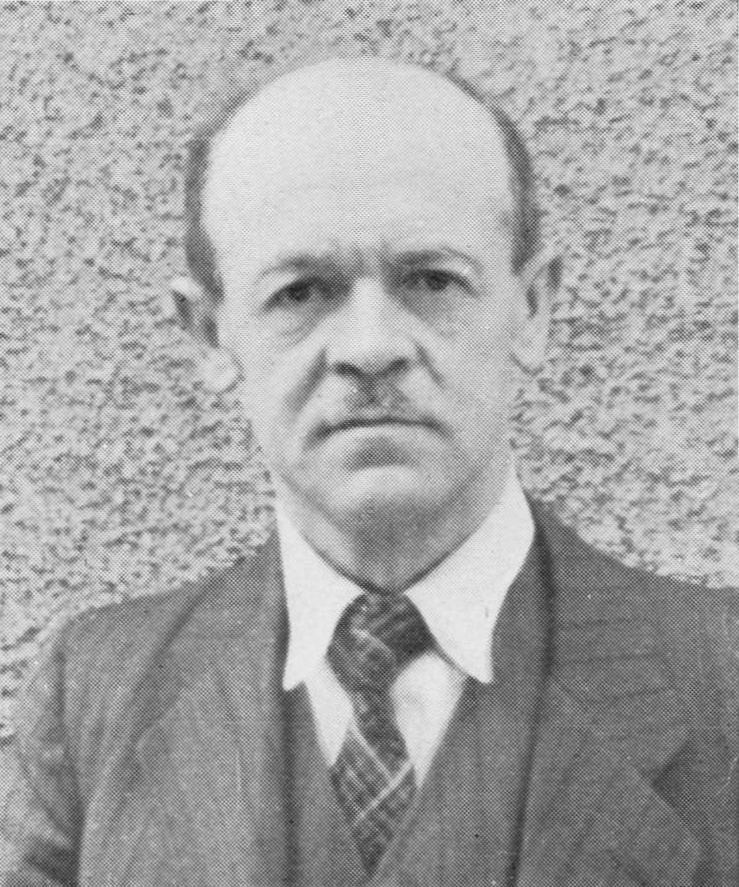
Margue c. 1945

Nicolas Margue (2 January 1888 in Fingig – 18 March 1976 in Luxembourg City) was a Luxembourgish professor and politician in the Christian Social People's Party.

From 1937 until the German invasion of Luxembourg in 1940, and then again from 1945 to 1948 he was the Minister for Agriculture and Education.

He was the only minister who did not escape to the border in time on 10 May 1940. At 3:30 in the morning he drove in the direction of the Belgian border. It was too late, however, and he could not get through. As the occupiers saw him as hostile to Germany, his whole family was resettled to Silesia, first to Leubus, then to Boberstein. One of his sons, Paul Margue, was drafted into the Reichsarbeitsdienst (RAD).

After the war Nicolas Margue was, together with Jean Feltes, one of the "fathers" of the controversial Official Luxembourgish Orthography. From 1945 to 1972 he was the president of the "Section historique" of the "Institut grand-ducal". From 1952 he was the Luxembourgish member of the Common Assembly of the European Coal and Steel Community, where he strongly advocated retaining Luxembourg as seat of the European institutions. Margue was also a member of the Action Committee for the United States of Europe, which had been founded in 1955 by Jean Monnet. On 4 August 1959 Nicolas Margue was nominated member of the Council of State, which he remained until his resignation on 30 September 1970.

He was the father of Georges Margue and Paul Margue.

== Publications ==
- Herchen, Arthur: Manuel d'histoire nationale, 1968. 8th edition. (This edition and the previous ones were revised and expanded by Nicolas Margue and Joseph Meyers)
- Margue, Nicolas: Aperçu historique am Le Luxembourg, le livre du Centenaire. Luxembourg: Imprimerie Saint-Paul, 1949. 2nd edition.
- Margue, Nicolas: Mouvements contre-révolutionnaires dans le Luxembourg 1831-32. Luxembourg, 1939 (Collection of articles which appeared in 1930, 1932 and 1933 in Ons Hémecht).
- Margue, Nicolas: Die Entwicklung des Luxemburger Nationalgefühls von 1870 bis heute. Deutsches Archiv für Landes- und Volksforschung, Leipzig, 1937.
