= María Josefa Pimentel, Duchess of Osuna =

Spanish Salonnière

The Most Excellent María Josefa Pimentel Duchess of Osuna GE
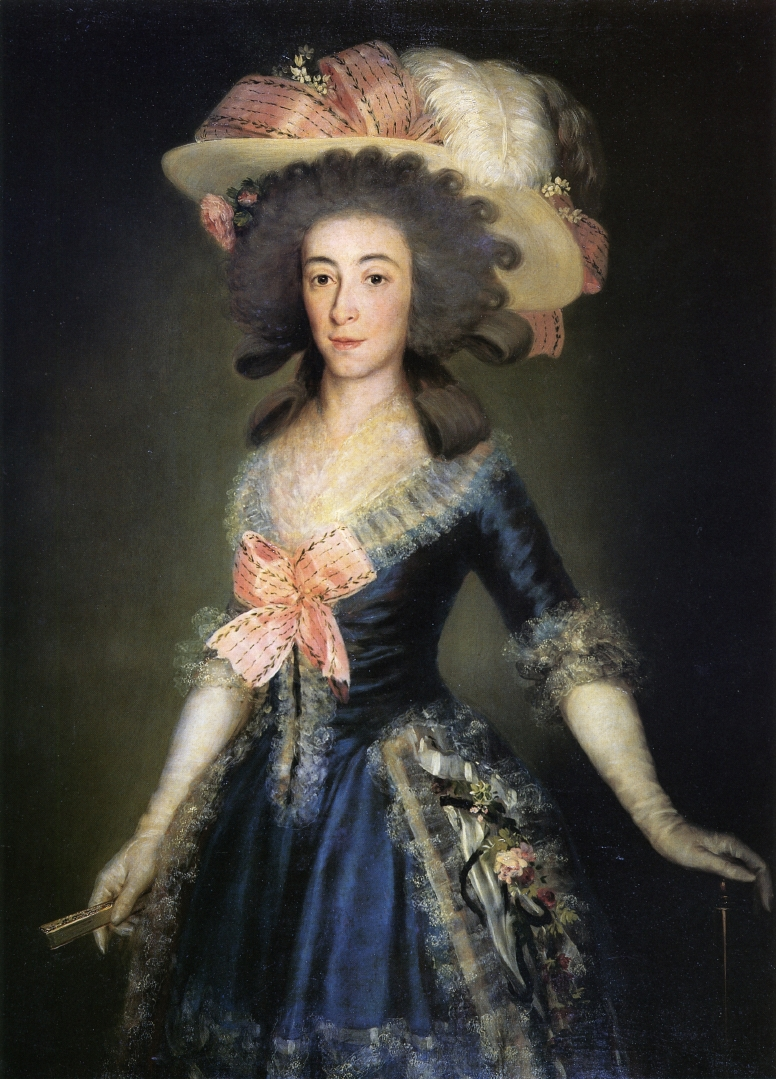
- Portrait by Francisco de Goya, 1785

Personal details
- Born: María Josefa de Borja Pimentel y Téllez-Girón; 26 November 1752 Madrid, Spain
- Died: 5 October 1834 (aged 81) Madrid, Spain
- Spouse: Pedro Téllez-Girón, 9th Duke of Osuna
- Children: Josefa Téllez-Girón; Francisco Téllez-Girón; Pedro Téllez-Girón; Joaquina Téllez-Girón; Manuela Téllez-Girón

María Josefa de Borja Pimentel y Téllez-Girón iure uxoris Duchess of Osuna, suo jure 12th Duchess of Benavente (26 November 1752 – 5 October 1834), was a Spanish Salonnière, famous as a patron of artists, writers and scientists and an important figure of the Spanish Age of Enlightenment. She was the first female (honorary) member of the royal Sociedad Económica de Amigos del País de Madrid as well as the first president of the royal Junta de Damas de Honor y Mérito.

== Biography ==
She married Pedro Téllez-Girón, 9th Duke of Osuna in 1771. The couple had many children; her possessions and noble titles were absorbed thereto by the Osuna family.

She was a noted figure of the Spanish Enlightenment. Soon after her marriage, she established a famous literary salon in her Palace near the royal palace in Madrid, which became a center of the French influenced Enlightenment in Spain, were science, culture, literature and art was discussed between aristocrats, foreign diplomats and artists. She played an important role in the ongoing social change in 18th-century Spain, in which women participated more fully in society and played a more active social role.

In 1787, she became the first President of the Junta de Damas de Honor y Mérito. It was a substantial pioneer role, since learned societies and academies was an important part of the Age of Enlightenment, but women's inclusion in them had been posed until the establishment of the Junta de Damas. She used her chairmanship to engage the society in work such as the education of poor girls and the rehabilitation of women criminals.

When the French invaded Spain in 1808, she fled from Madrid via Seville to Cadiz, where she lived until the French left Spain in 1814.

The Duchess and her husband were among the most important aristocrats who became patrons of the painter Francisco de Goya. The Duchess not only purchased one of the first editions of Los Caprichos, but also commissioned a series of cabinet paintings on the subject of witchcraft from Goya, amongst them El aquelarre (Witches' Sabbath). In the famous portrait Goya painted of her, she is shown standing with noble reserve, and dressed according to the fashion initiated by Queen Marie Antoinette in Paris at that time. In another famous painting, Goya portrayed the ducal family. One of her children was Joaquina Téllez-Girón, Marchioness of Santa Cruz, who was also portrayed by Goya.

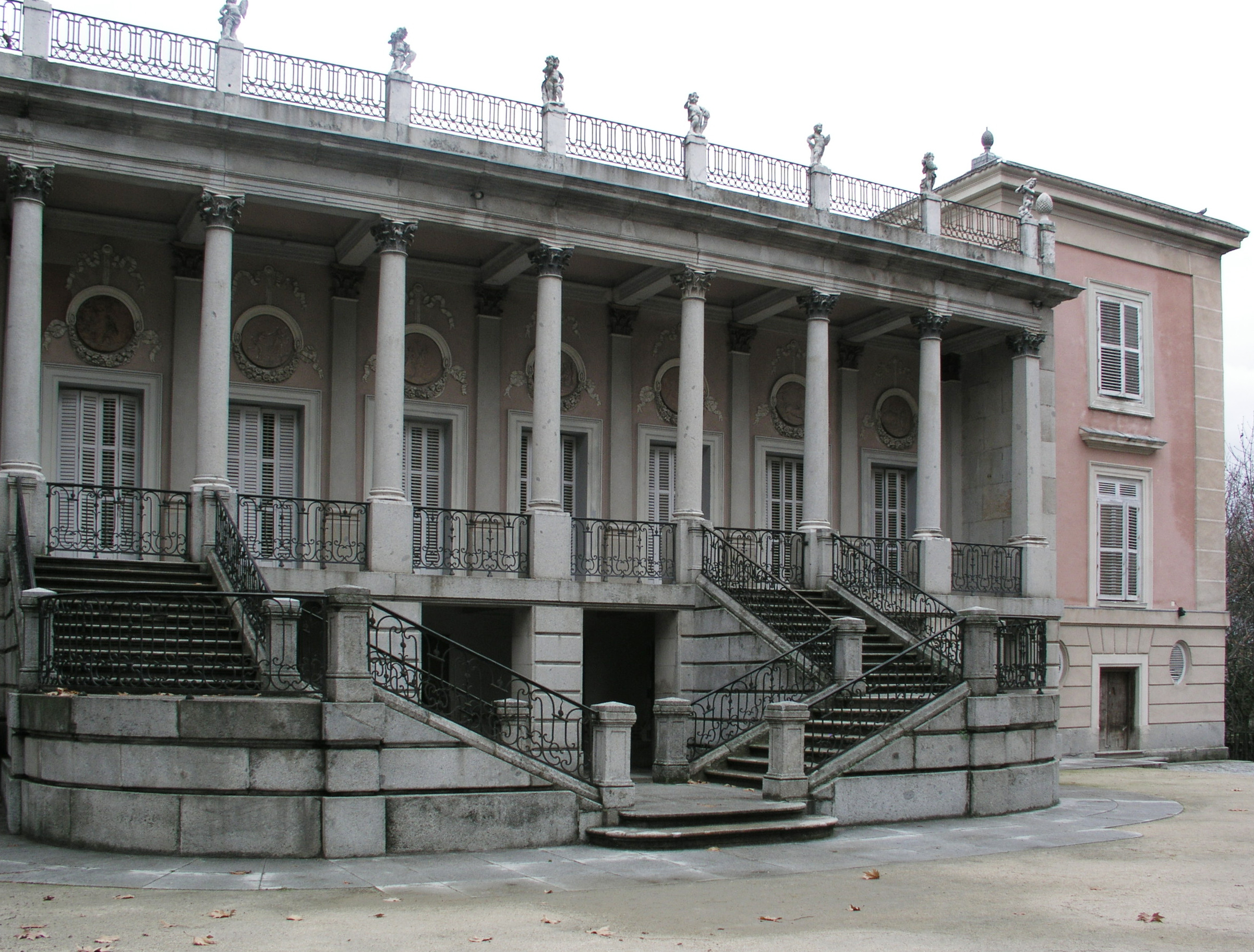
Palace of the Dukes of Osuna

The Duchess was interested in landscape gardening and from the 1780s she developed a garden at El Capricho, the family estate at Alameda de Osuna, near Madrid. The garden, which survives in good condition, shows English and French influence.

== Full name and title ==
In full, her Spanish name and titles were: Doña María Josefa de la Soledad Alonso Pimentel Téllez-Girón Borja y Centelles, décimo quinta condesa y décimo segunda duquesa de Benavente, décimo tercera duquesa de Béjar, décimo tercera duquesa de Plasencia, décimo segunda duquesa de Arcos, décimo cuarta duquesa de Gandia, novena duquesa de Mandas y Villanueva, octava marquesa de Jabalquinto, décimo quinta marquesa de Gibraleón, novena marquesa de Terranova, décimo segunda marquesa de Lombay, décimo sexta marquesa de Zahara, décimo octava condesa de Mayorga, décimo sexta condesa de Luna, décimo tercera condesa de Bañares, séptima condesa de Belalcázar, décimo cuarta condesa de Oliva, décimo primera condesa de Mayalde, décimo segunda condesa de Bailén, décimo segunda condesa de Casares, décimo quinta vizcondesa de la Puebla de Alcocer, 6 veces Grande de España, principessa di Anglona, duchessa di Monteagudo, marchesa di Marguini, contessa di Osilò e di Coguinas en Cerdeña, dama de la Orden de María Luisa.

== Ancestry ==
Ancestors of María Josefa Pimentel, Duchess of Osuna

16. Antonio Pimentel de Quiñones y Herrera, 8th Duke of Benavente
8. Francisco Casimiro Pimentel, 9th Duke of Benavente
17. Isabel Francisca de Benavídes, 3rd Marchioness of Jabalquinto
4. Antonio Pimentel de Quiñones López de Zúñiga, 10th Duke of Benavente
18. Juan Manuel de Zuñiga Sotomayor y Mendoza, 9th Duke of Bejar
9. Manuela de Zuñiga Sotomaior y Silva
19. Teresa Sarmiento de Silva y Fernandez de Hijar
2. Francisco de Borja Pimentel y Borja, 11th Duke of Benavente
20. Francisco Carlos de Borja Centelles y Doria, 9th Duke of Gandia
10. Pascual Francisco de Borja Aragón y Centelles, 10th Duke of Gandia
21. María Ponce de León Aragón Folch de Cardona y Fernández de Córdova
5. María Ignacia Juana Magdalena de Borja Aragón Centelles Ponce de León
22. Luis Ignacio Fernández de Córdova, 6th Marquis of Priego
11. Juana Fernández de Cordoba-Figueroa y Fernandez de Cordoba
23. Mariana Fernández de Córdova
1. María Josefa Pimentel, 12th Duchess of Benavente
24. Juan Tellez-Girón y Enriquez de Ribera, 4th Duke of Osuna
12. Gaspar Téllez-Girón, 5th Duke de Osuna
25. Isabel de Sandoval y Padilla
6. José Maria Tellez-Girón y Benavides, 7th Duke of Osuna
26. Luis de Benavides Carrillo, Marquis of Caracena
13. Ana Antonia de Benavides, 6th Marchioness of Frómista
27. Catalina Ponce de León y Fernández de Córdoba
3. María Faustina Tellez Giron y Perez de Guzman
28. Juan Claros Pérez de Guzmán, 11th Duke of Medina Sidonia
14. Manuel Pérez de Guzmán, 12th Duke of Medina Sidonia
29. Teresa Pimentel y Benavides
7. Francisca Perez de Guzman y Silva
30. Gregorio María de Silva y Mendoza, 9th Duke of the Infantado
15. Luisa Maria de Silva y Mendez de Haro
31. María Mendez de Haro y Fernandez de Cordoba

Arms of the Duchess of Osuna and Benavente

== Additional information ==
=== Images by Francisco Goya ===
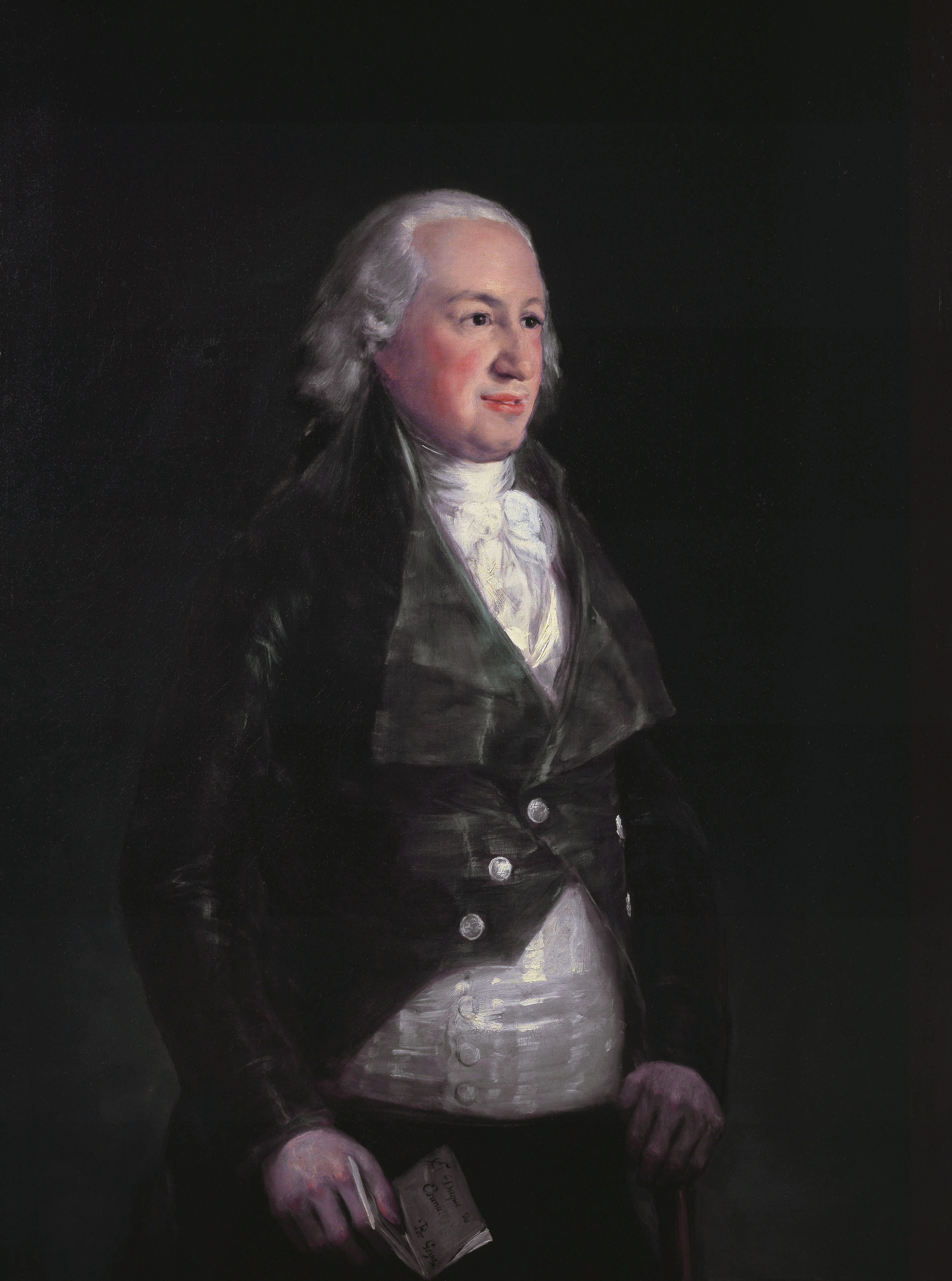
The 9th Duke of Osuna (1798)

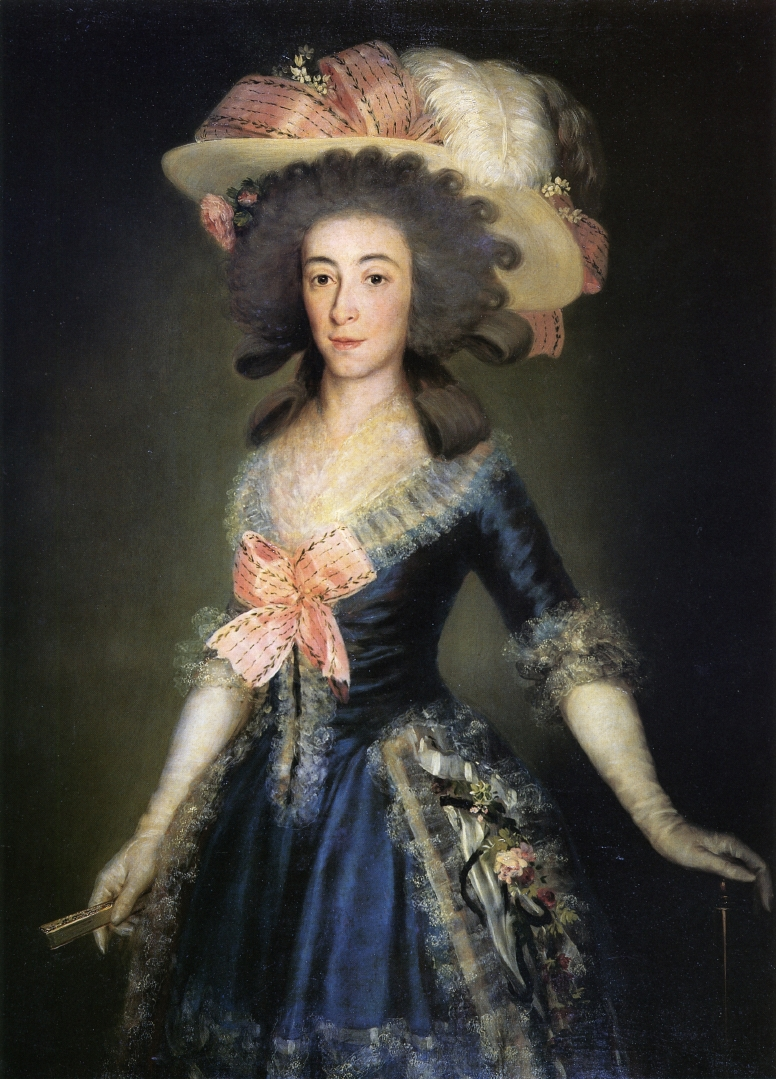
The Duchess of Osuna (1785)

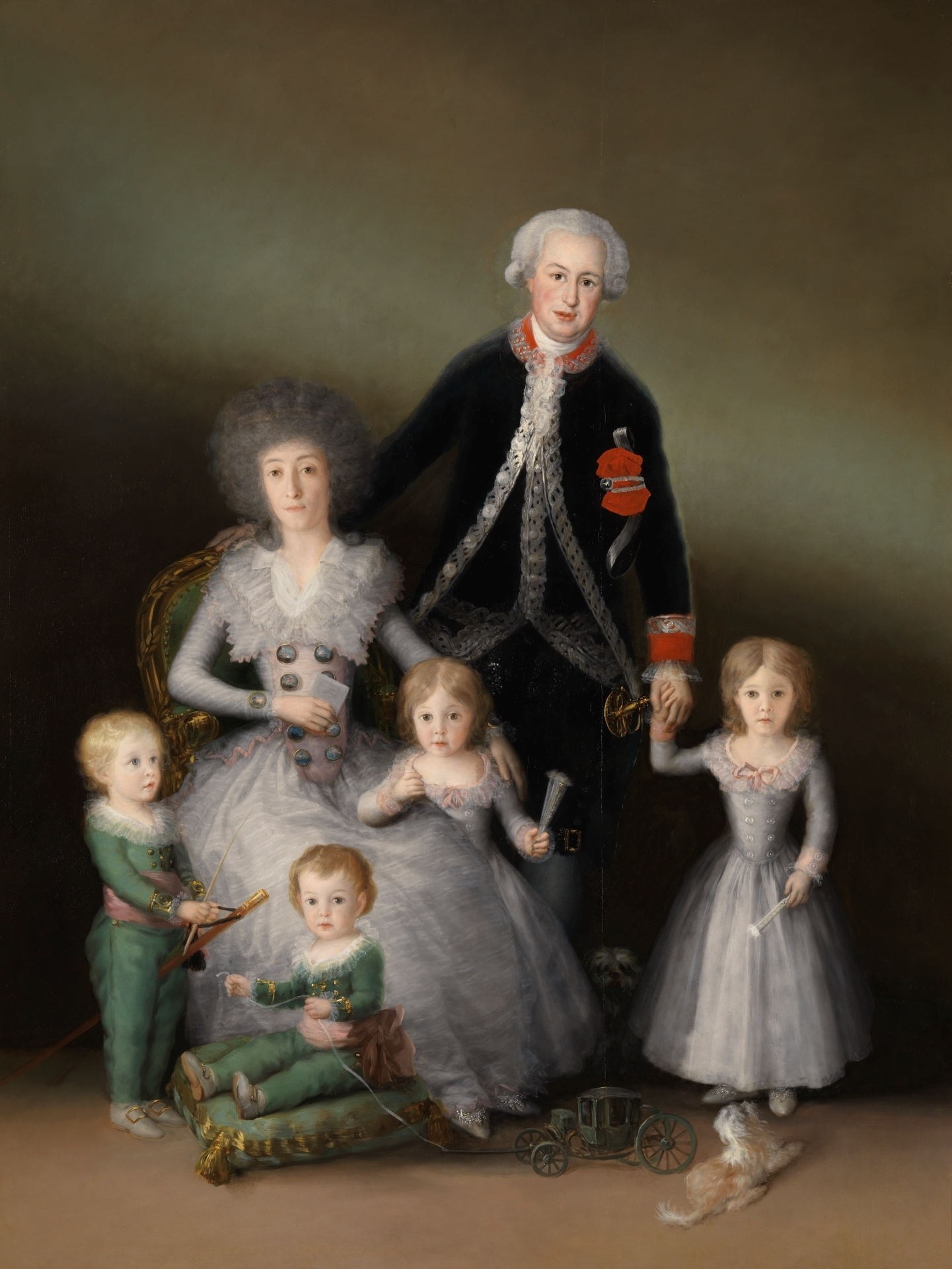
The 9th Duke of Osuna and his young family (1788)

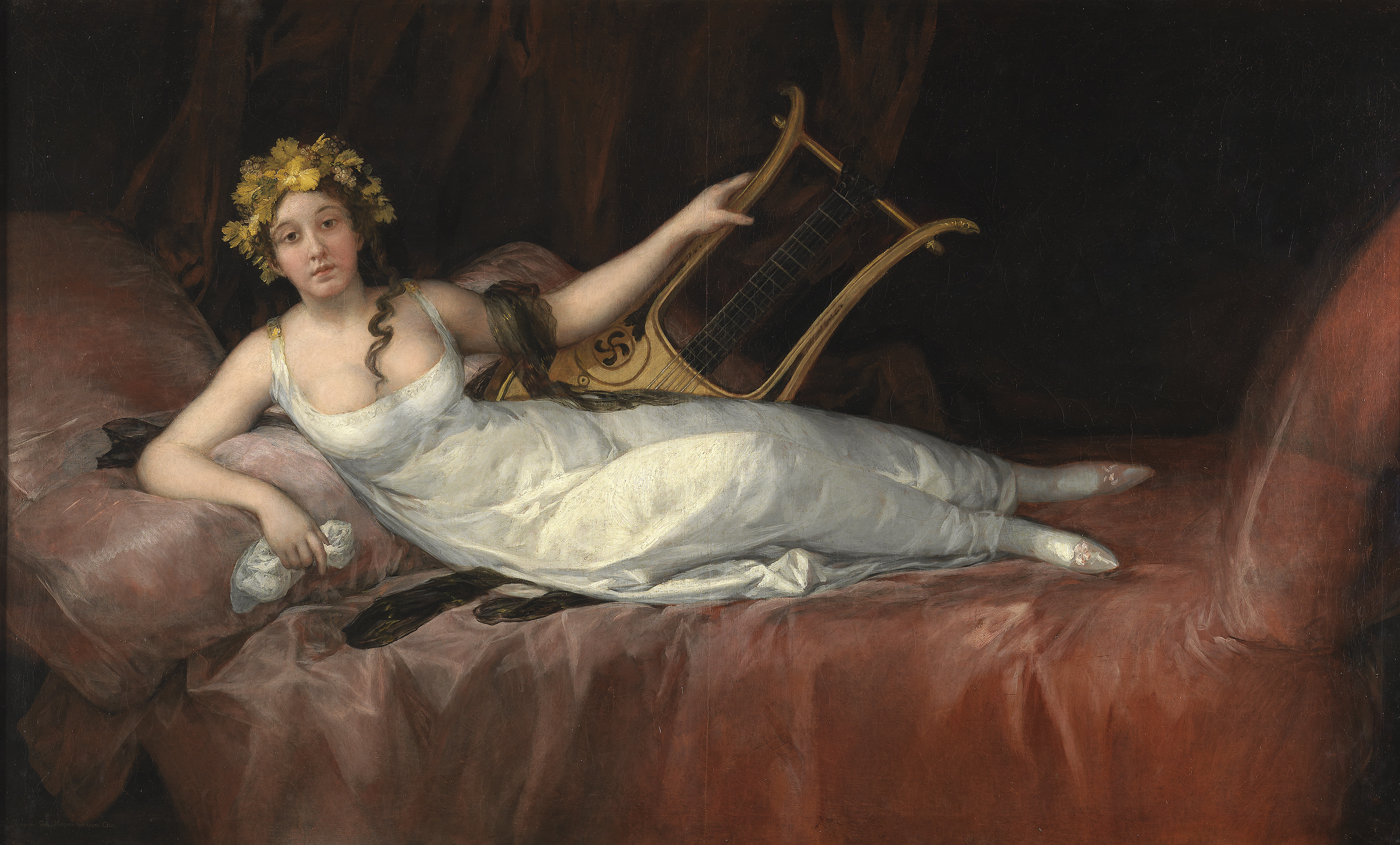
The Marchioness of Santa Cruz (1805)

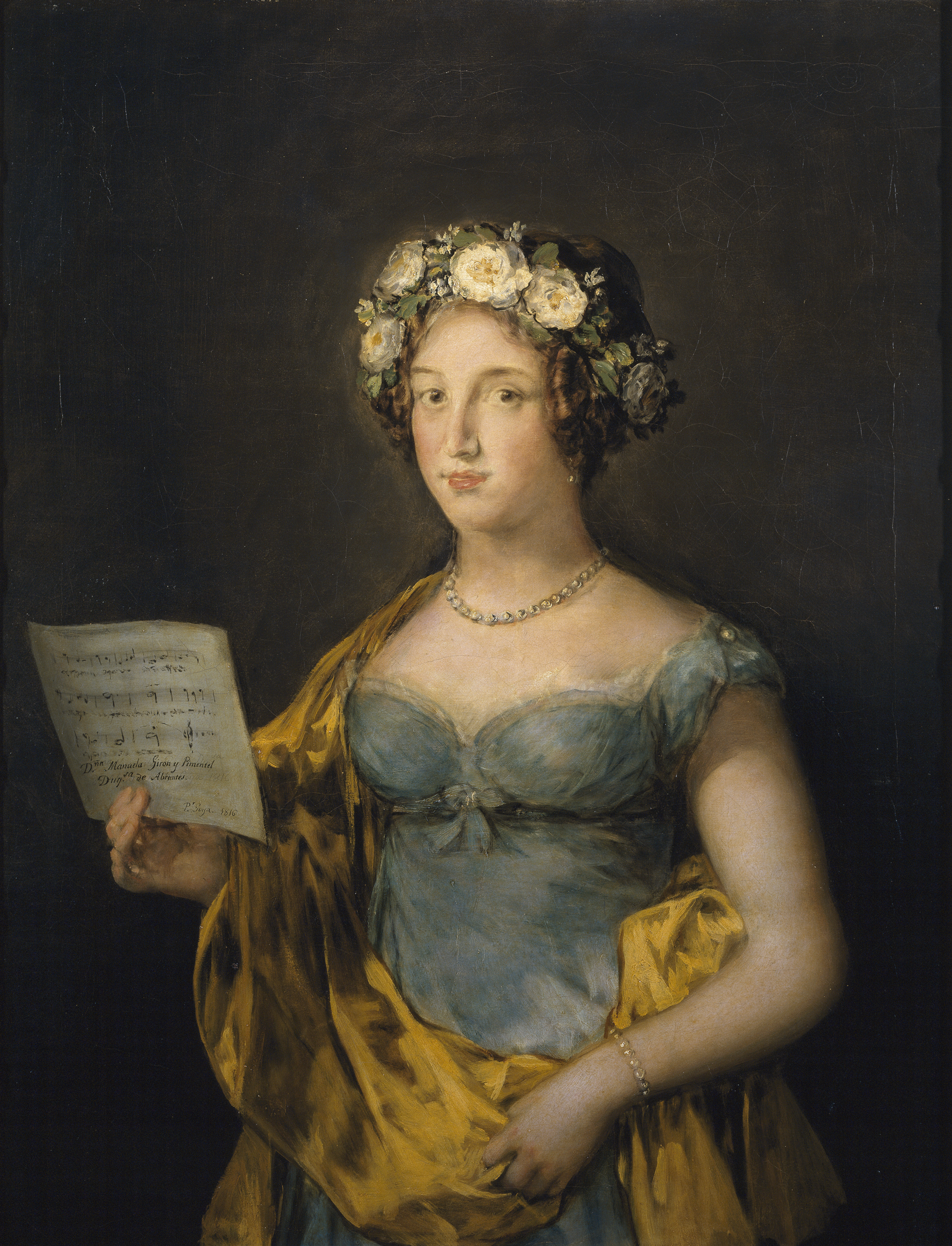
The Duchess of Abrantes (1816)

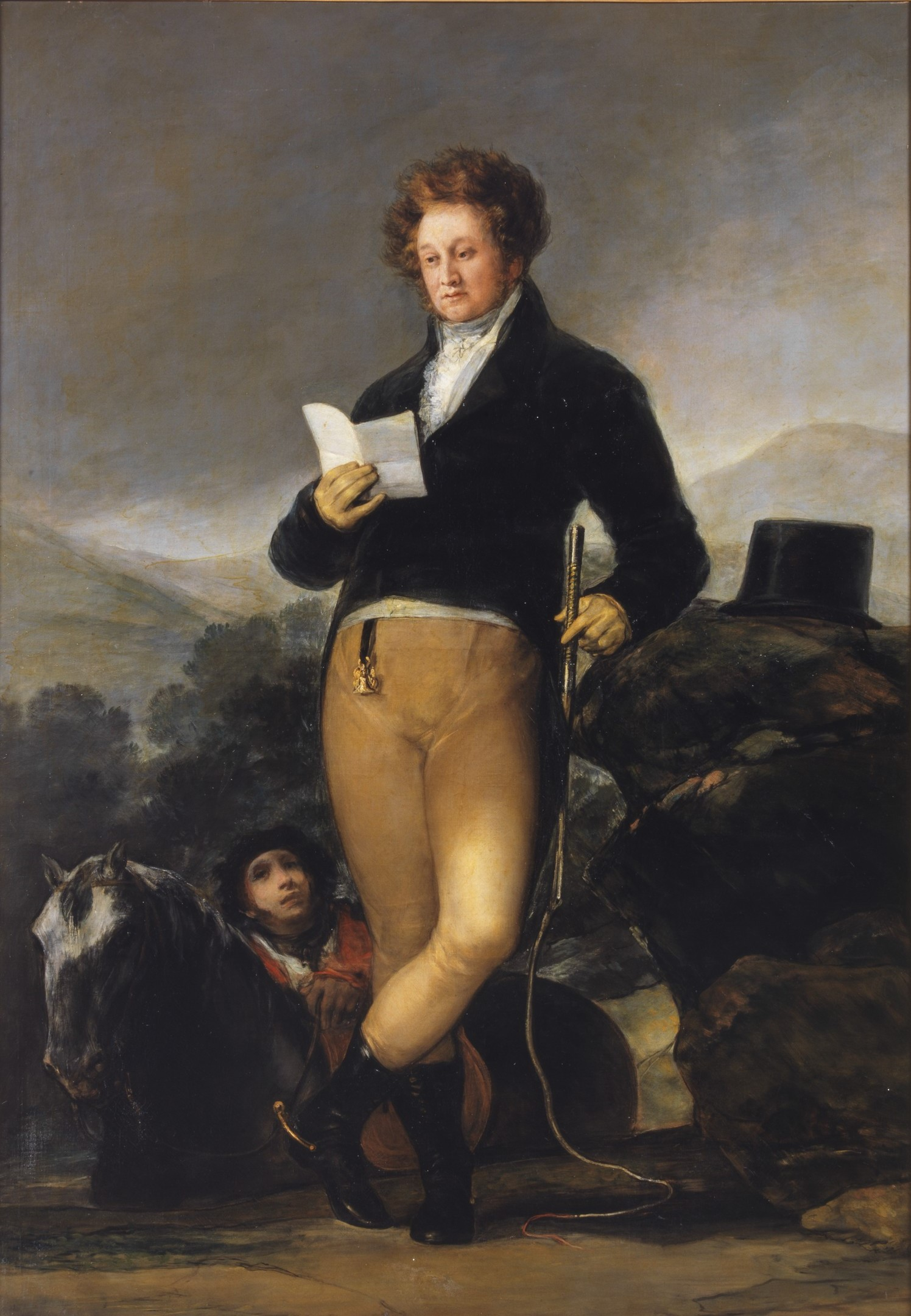
The 10th Duke of Osuna (1816)

=== Paintings by Francisco Goya for the Duke and Duchess ===
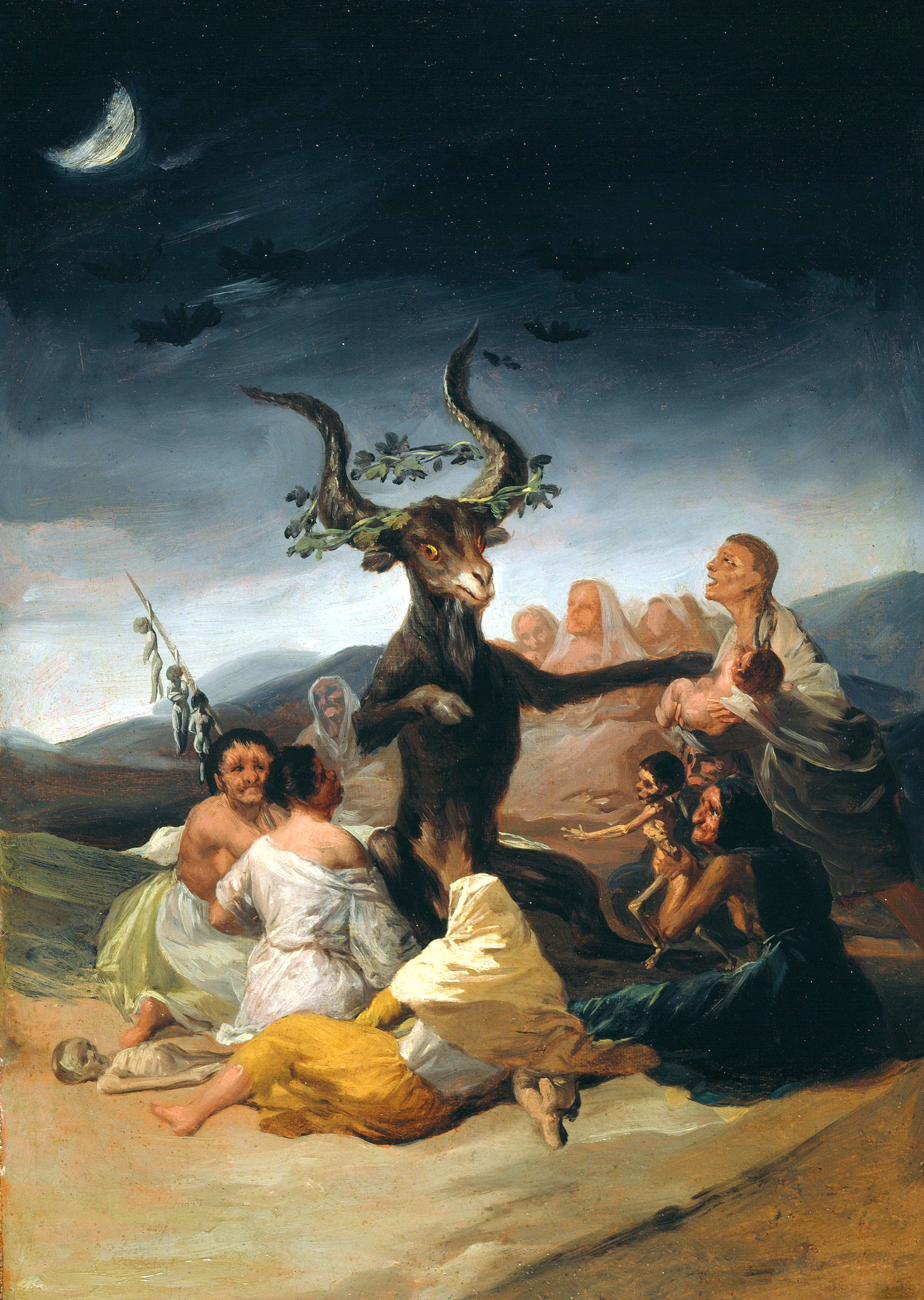
Witches Sabbath 1797-1798

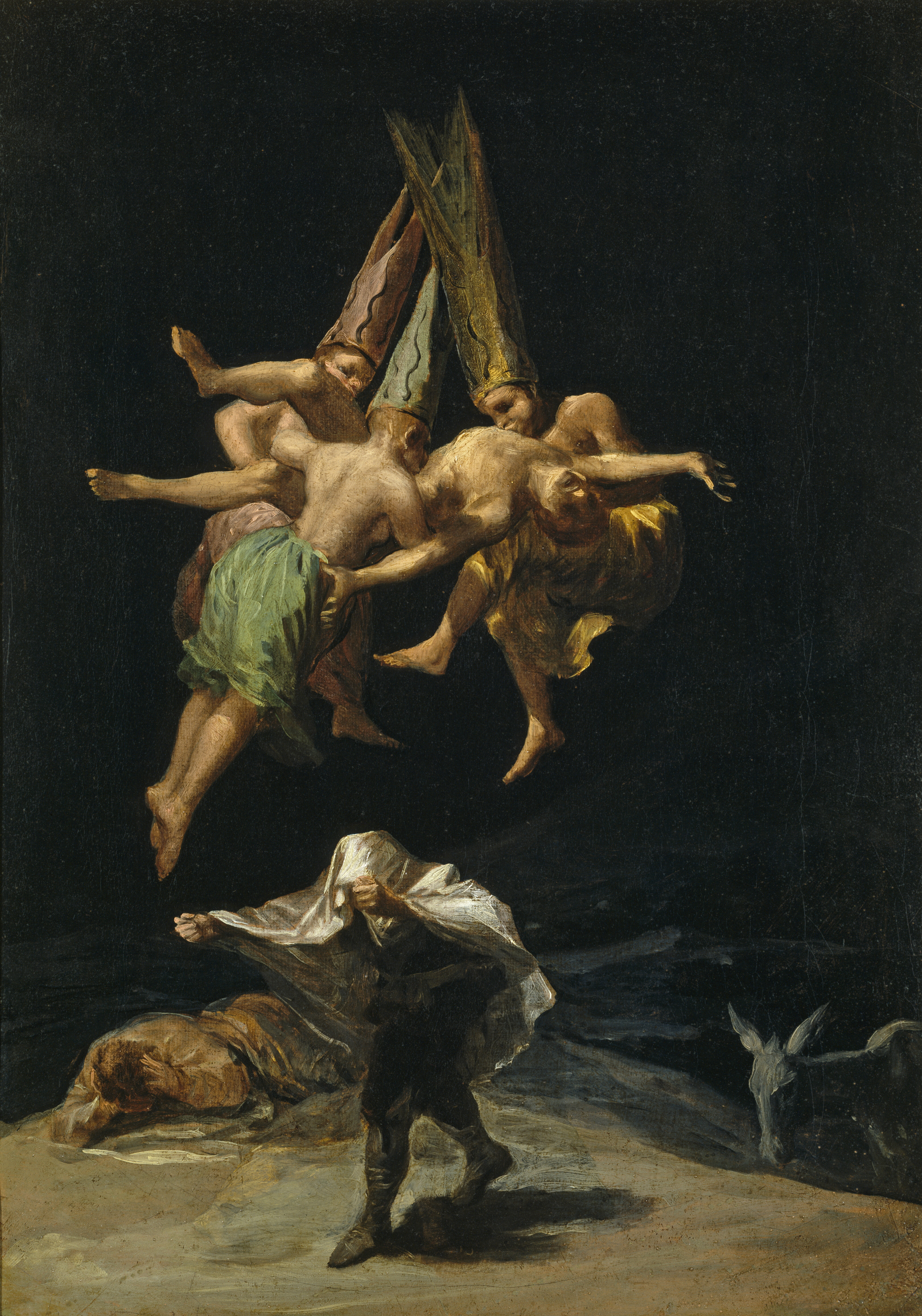
Witches Flight 1797-1798

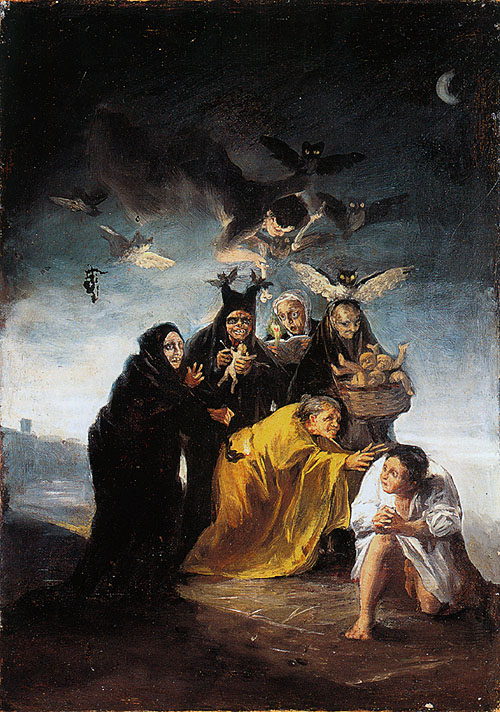
Witches Spells 1797-1798

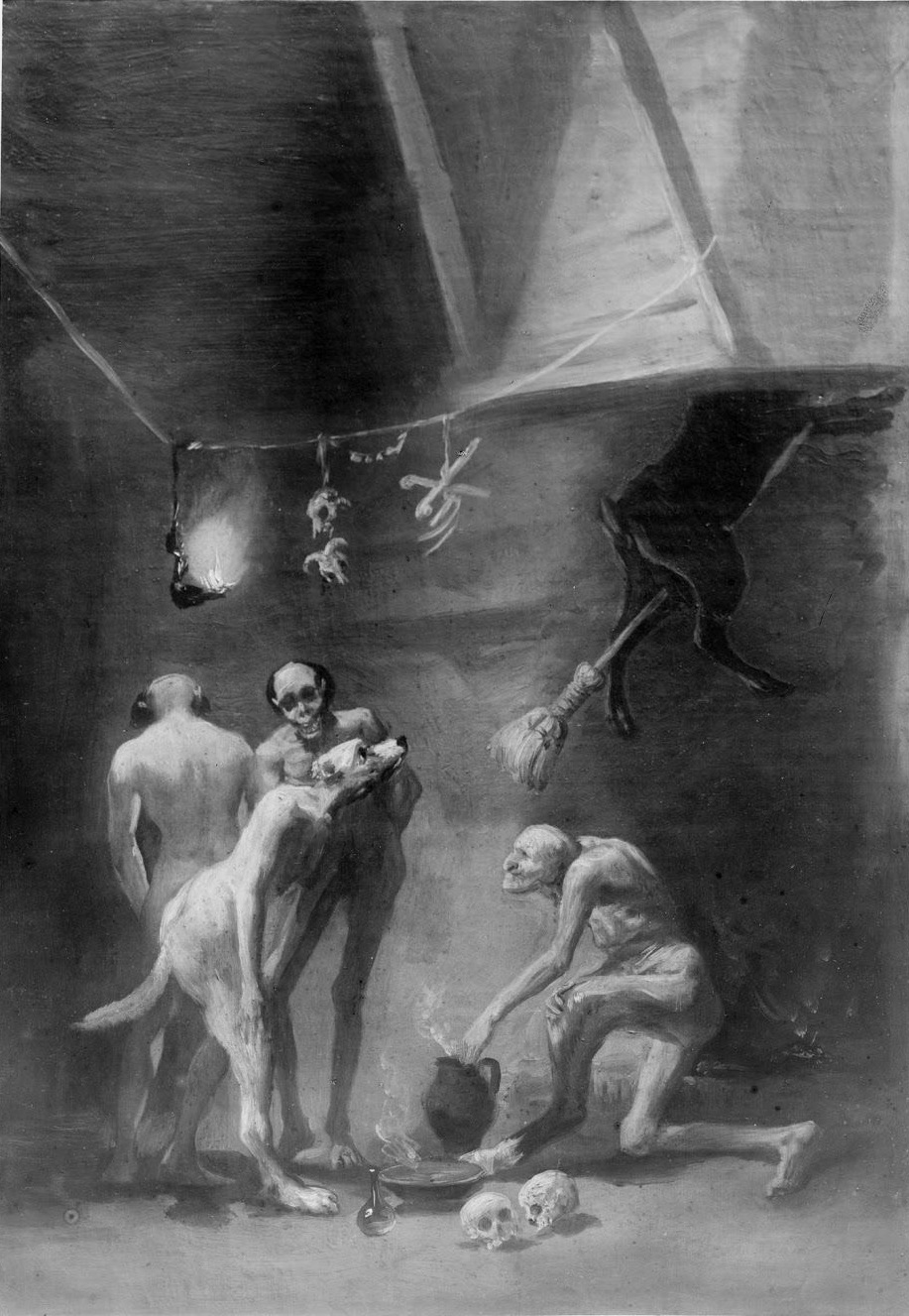
The Witches Kitchen 1797-1798

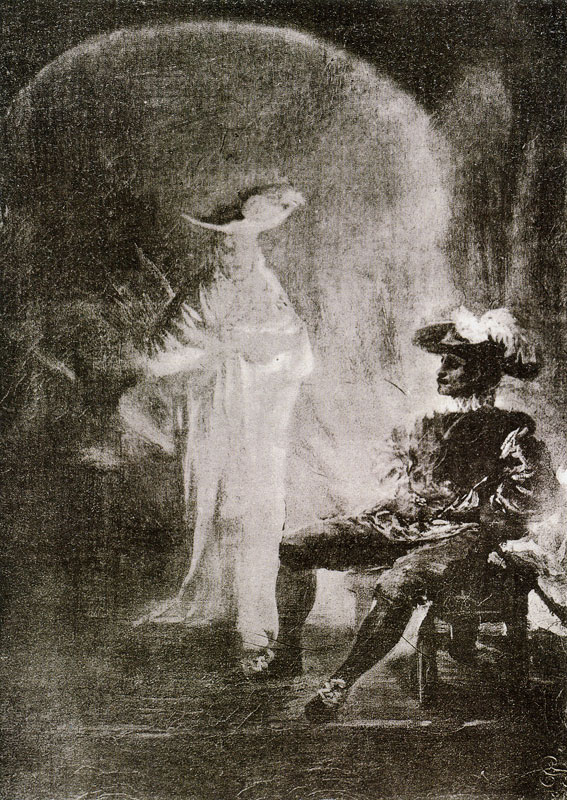
Don Juan and the Commander"aka The stone Guest 1797-1798

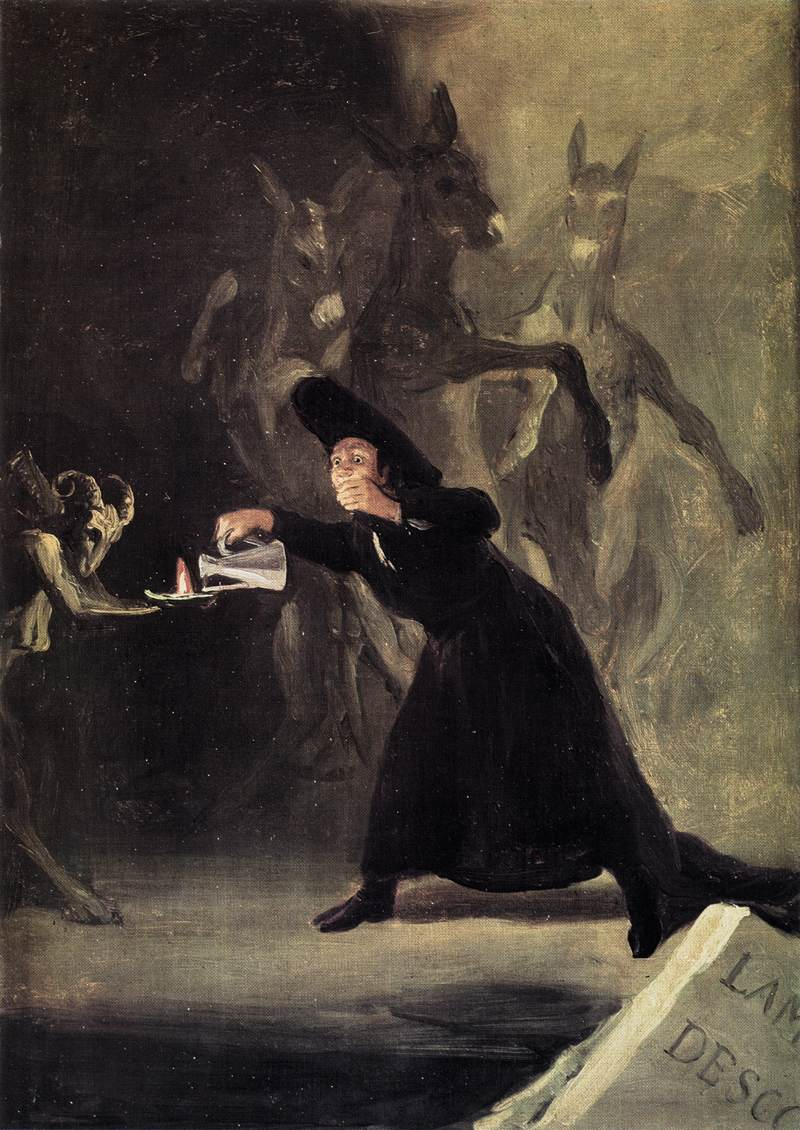
The Bewitched Man 1798

== See also ==
- Paintings for the alameda of the Dukes of Osuna

Spanish nobility
Preceded by Francisco Pimentel	Countess-Duchess of Benavente; 1763–1834	Succeeded by Pedro Téllez-Girón
