= Pedro Téllez-Girón =

Pedro Téllez-Girón may refer to:

- Pedro Téllez-Girón, 3rd Count of Ureña, (died 1531), Spanish noble, leader of the Revolt of the Comuneros
- Pedro Téllez-Girón y de la Cueva, 1st Duke of Osuna, (1537–1590), Spanish nobleman and administrator
- Pedro Téllez-Girón, 3rd Duke of Osuna, (1574–1624), Spanish nobleman and politician
- Pedro Téllez-Girón, 8th Duke of Osuna, (1728–1787), Spanish nobleman
- Pedro Téllez-Girón, 9th Duke of Osuna, (1755–1807), Grandee of Spain and military commander
- Pedro de Alcántara Téllez Girón (1786–1851), Spanish military officer and politician
- Pedro de Alcántara Téllez-Girón, 11th Duke of Osuna, (1810–1844), Spanish peer
