= Claros (surname) =

Claros is a Spanish surname, which is derived from claro, meaning a "clearing in a forest". Notable individuals with this surname include:

- Domingo José Claros Pérez de Guzmán, 13th Duke of Medina Sidonia (1691–1739)
- Jorge Claros (born 1986), Honduran football player
- Josep Clarós (born 1969), Spanish basketball coach
- Juan Claros Pérez de Guzmán, 11th Duke of Medina Sidonia (1642–1713)
- Lizandro Claros (born 1998), Salvadorian footballer

== Other uses ==
- Claros, Greece
- Montes Claros, Brazil
