= Pedro Téllez-Girón, 9th Duke of Osuna =

Spanish nobleman (1755–1807)

The Most Excellent Pedro Téllez-Girón 9th Duke of Osuna GE
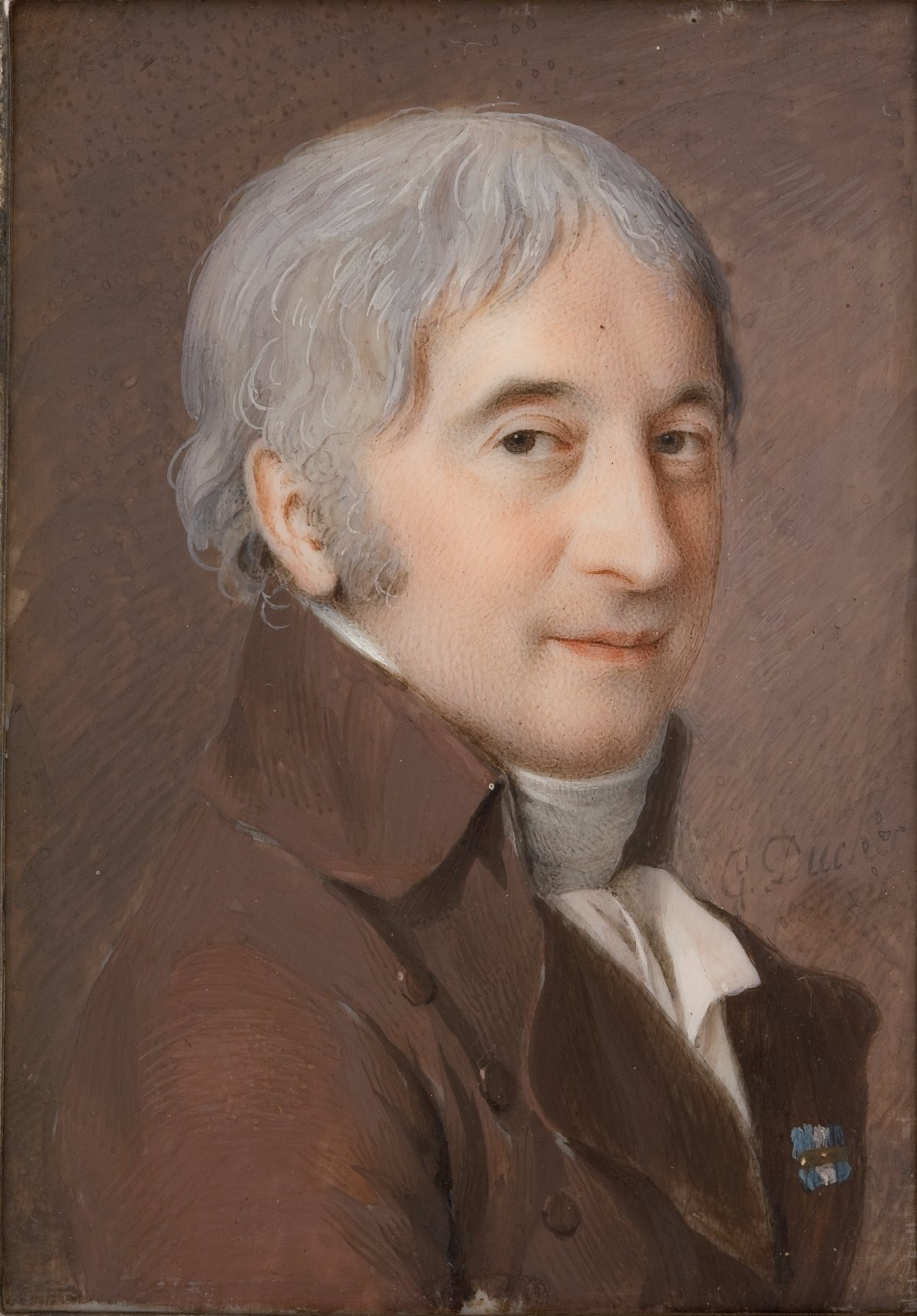
- Portrait by Guillermo Ducker, 1805
- Born: Pedro de Alcántara Téllez-Girón y Pacheco; 8 August 1755; Madrid, Spain
- Died: 7 January 1807 (aged 51); Madrid, Spain
- Spouse: María Josefa Pimentel
- Children: Josefa, Marchioness of Camarasa (1783–1817); Joaquina, Marchioness of Sta. Cruz (1784–1851); Francisco, 10th Duke de Osuna (1785–1830); Pedro, Prince of Anglona (1786–1851); Manuela, Duchess of Abrantes (1794–1838)
- Parents: Pedro Zoilo Téllez-Girón y de Guzmán (father); María Vicenta Pacheco Téllez-Girón (mother)
- Family: House of Osuna

Seat T of the Real Academia Española
- In office 23 February 1790 – 7 January 1807
- Preceded by: José Miguel de Flores
- Succeeded by: Demetrio Ortiz

Pedro de Alcántara Téllez-Girón y Pacheco, 9th Duke of Osuna, Grandee of Spain (Note: Name in full: Spanish: Don Pedro de Alcántara María Cayetano Ciriaco Rafael Domingo Vicente Téllez-Girón y Pacheco, noveno duque de Osuna, décimo marqués de Peñafiel, conde de Fontanar, décimo tercér conde de Ureña, señor de la villa de Morón de la Frontera, Archidona, El Arahal, Olvera, Ortejicar, Cazalla de la Sierra, Tiedra, Gumiel de Izán y Briones, Grande de España de 1ra clase, Camarero mayor del Rey, Notario mayor de los Reinos de Castilla, teniente general de los Reales Ejércitos, coronel del Regimiento de Reales Guardias Españoles y su Director general, miembro del Supremo Consejo de la Guerra, embajador extraordinario en Viena, 24 de la Real academia (10.7.1787), gentilhombre de cámara con ejercicio de Carlos III y de Carlos IV, caballero del Toisón de Oro (4.4.1794), Gran Cruz de la Orden de Carlos III)) (8 August 1755 – 7 January 1807), was a Spanish nobleman and military commander during the French Revolutionary Wars.

== Biography ==
=== Family ===
His father, the 8th Duke, was Pedro Zoilo Téllez Girón y de Guzmán (27 June 1728 – 1 April 1787) and his mother was María Vicenta de la Portería Pacheco Téllez-Girón (born 28 July 1735).

In 1772, he married María Josefa Pimentel, 12th Countess-Duchess of Benavente. She was 15th Countess of Benavente, Grandee of Spain, 13th Duchess of Béjar, Duchess of Arcos, Duchess of Gandía and Duchess of Monteagudo, Princess of Esquilache and Marquise of Lombay, whose possessions and noble titles were absorbed thereto by the Osuna family.

=== Military career ===
Téllez-Girón held important commands during the War of the Pyrenees which began on 7 March 1793 and ended with the Peace of Basel on 22 July 1795. As a Lieutenant General, he commanded a column under Captain General Antonio Ricardos in the Battle of Mas Deu in the eastern Pyrenees on 19 May 1793. Soon after the battle, he transferred out of Ricardos' Army of Catalonia. He later fought in the western Pyrenees. In the fall of 1794, he was placed in charge of the defense of Navarre. The Army of the western Pyrenees under French General Bon-Adrien Jeannot de Moncey defeated his badly outnumbered troops in the Battle of Orbaitzeta in October 1794, though he was able to keep the French from capturing the city of Pamplona.

== Portraits ==
In a famous portrait, Goya portrays the Duke of Osuna without any medals in front of a dark background. The only indication of his military background is the baton he holds. One of his children was Joaquina Téllez-Girón, Marchioness of Santa Cruz, who was also portrayed by Goya. Another of the children from Goya's painting was Pedro de Álcantara Téllez-Girón y Pimentel, (1786–1851), Principe de Anglona, Captain General of the Island of Cuba from 10 January 1840 to 7 March 1841, and who was substituted by Jerónimo Valdés y Sierra (1784–1855), Captain General of the Island of Cuba from 7 March 1841 to 13 September 1843. (Note: Pedro de Alcántara Téllez-Girón held a number of titles. In addition to being the 9th Duke of Osuna, he was also the 8th Marquis of Peñafiel, the 13th Count of Ureña, the 15th Count and 12th Duke of Benavente, Duke of Gandía, Duke of Arcos, Duke of Medina, Duke of Ríoseco, Duke of Béjar, Marquis of Lombay, and Grandee of Spain (from 1787), among others.)

=== Images by Francisco Goya ===
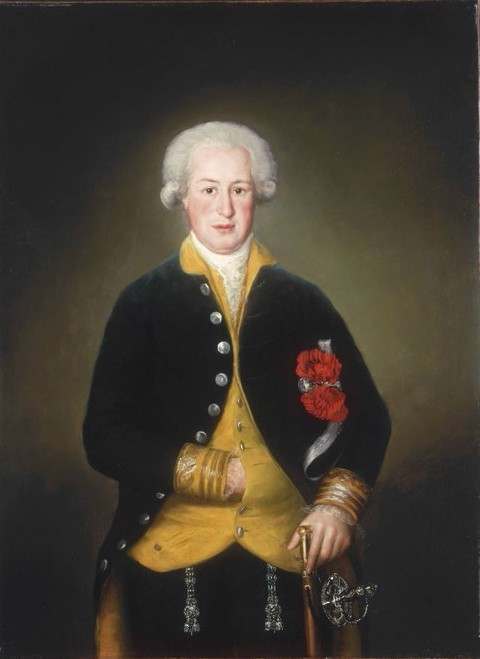
The 9th Duke of Osuna (1785)

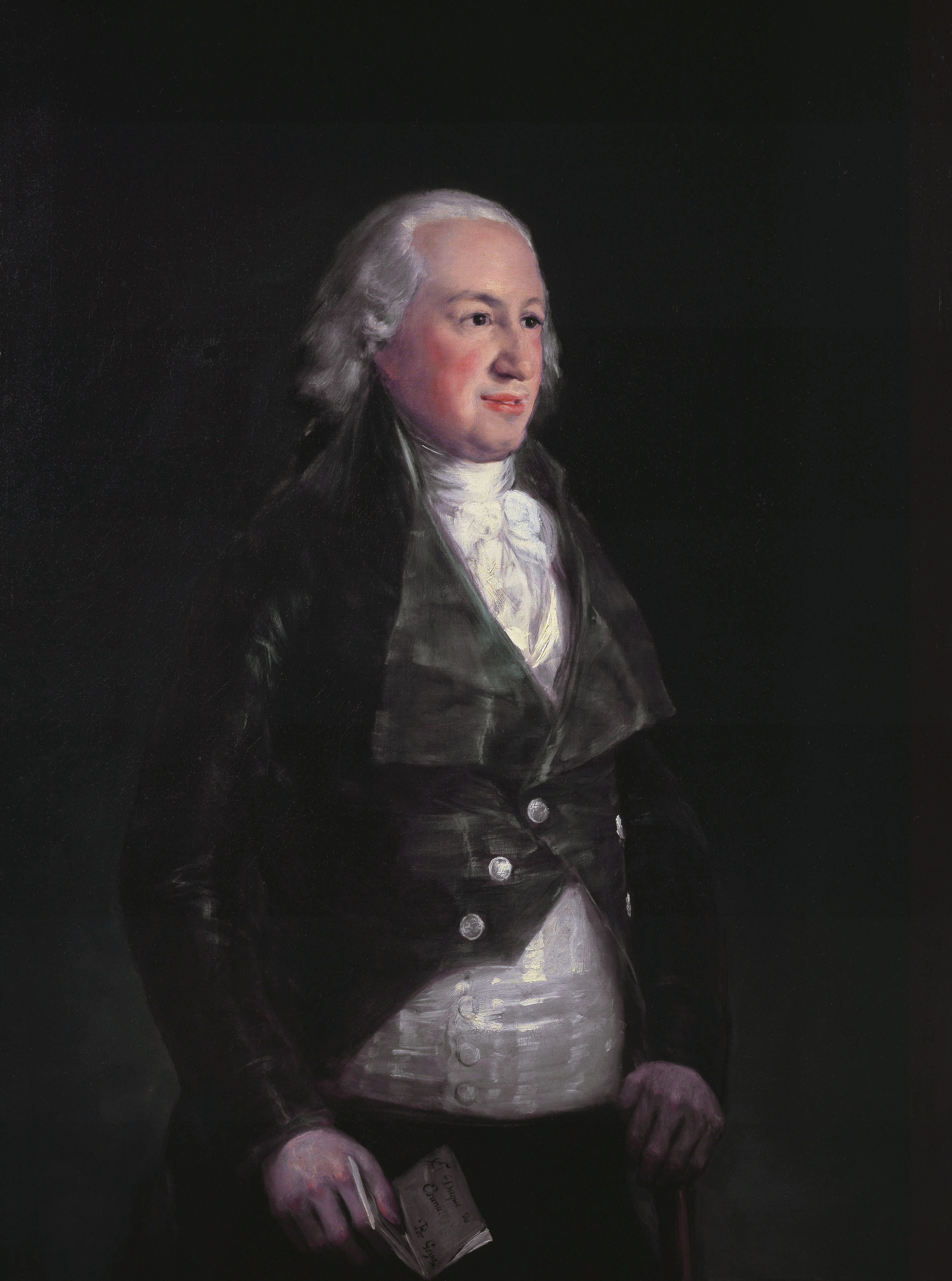
The 9th Duke of Osuna (1785)

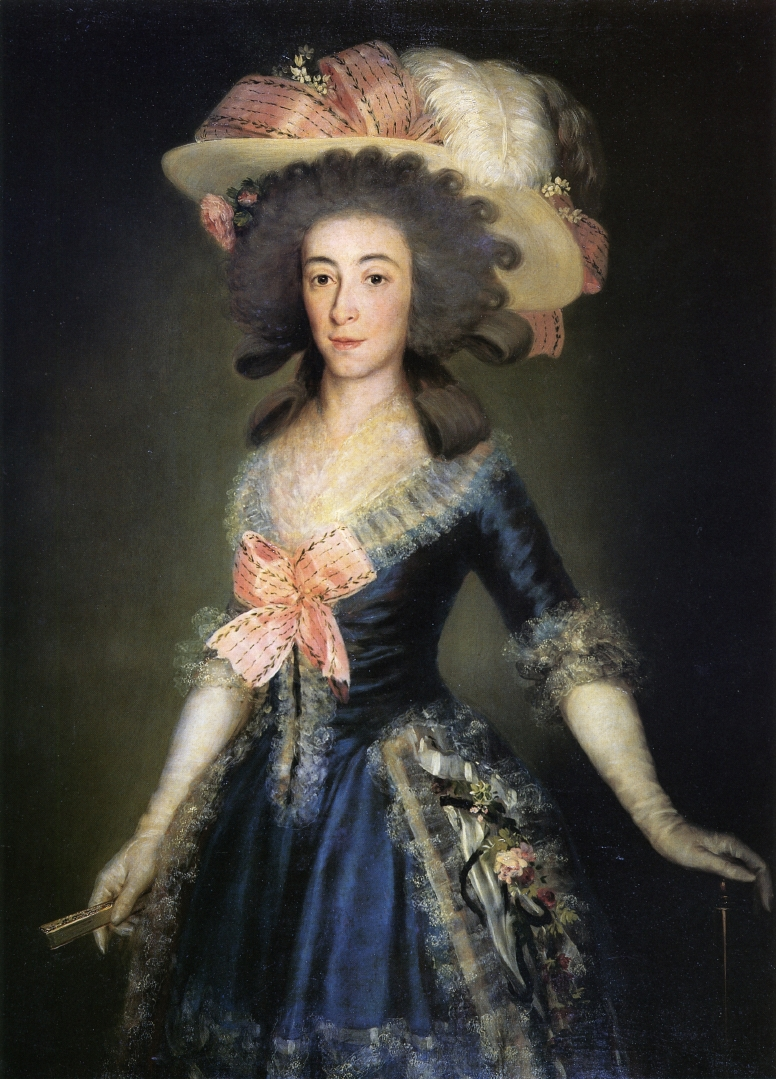
The Duchess of Osuna (1785)

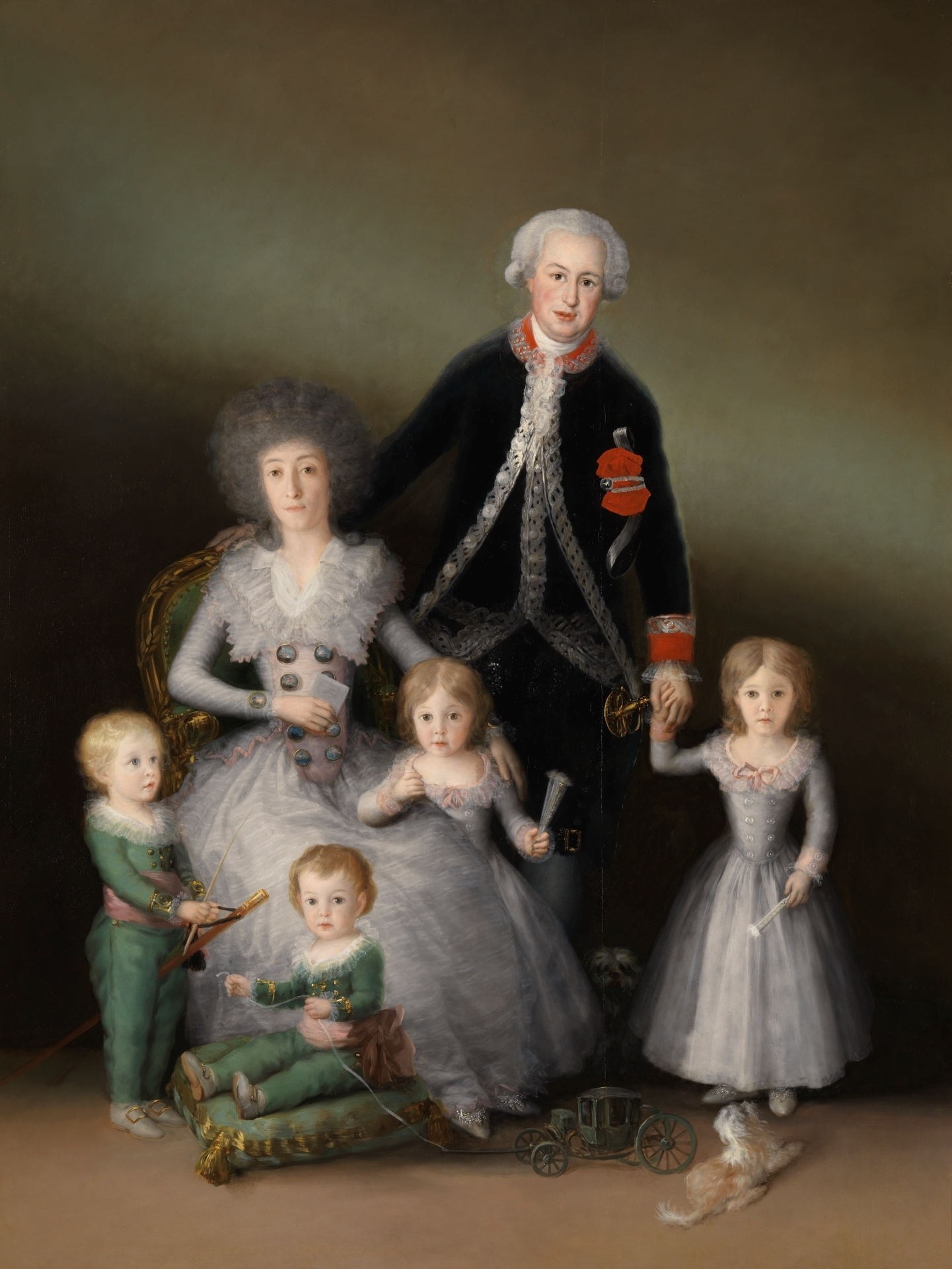
The Duke and Duchess of Osuna and their Children (1788)

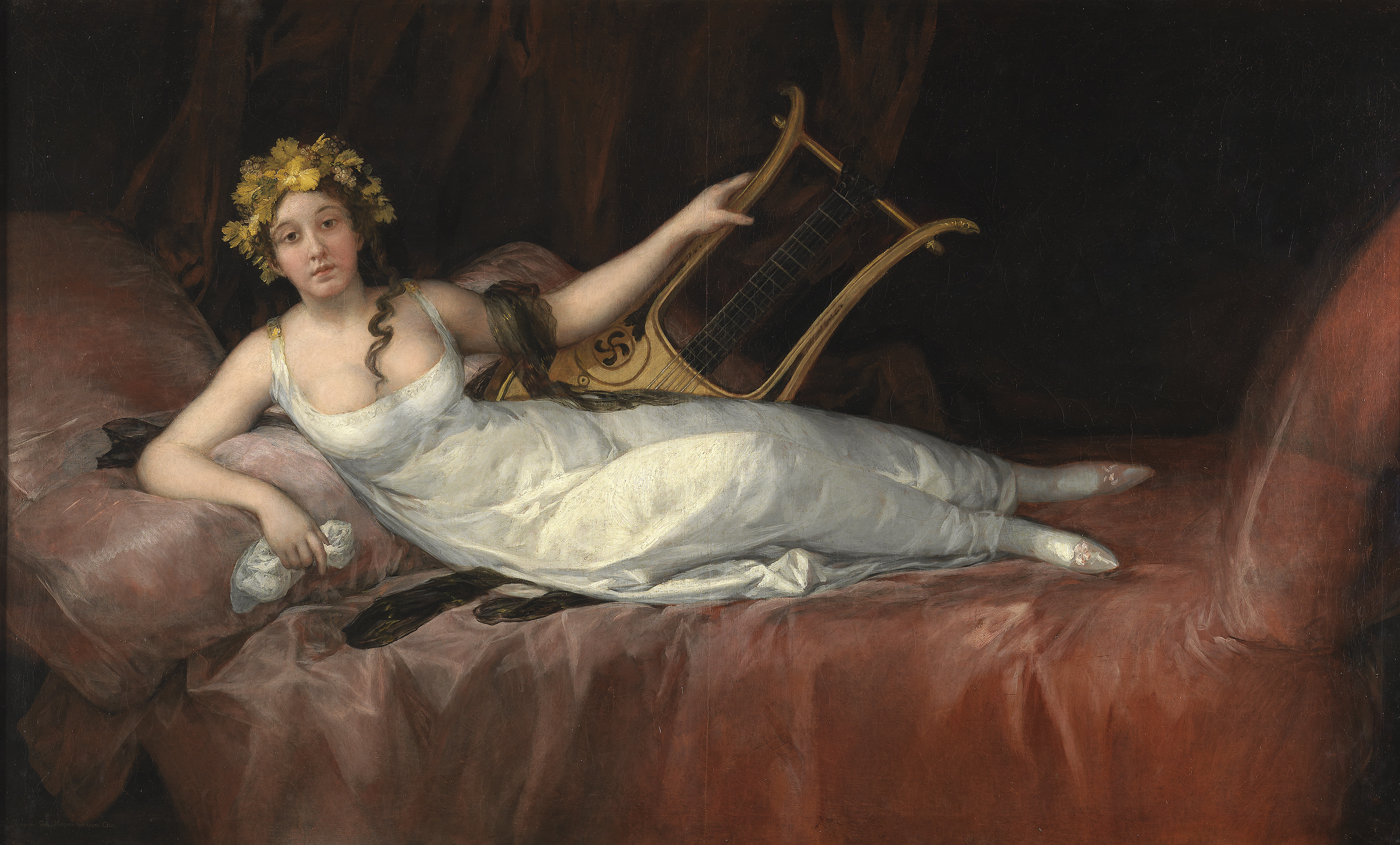
The Marchioness of Santa Cruz (1805)

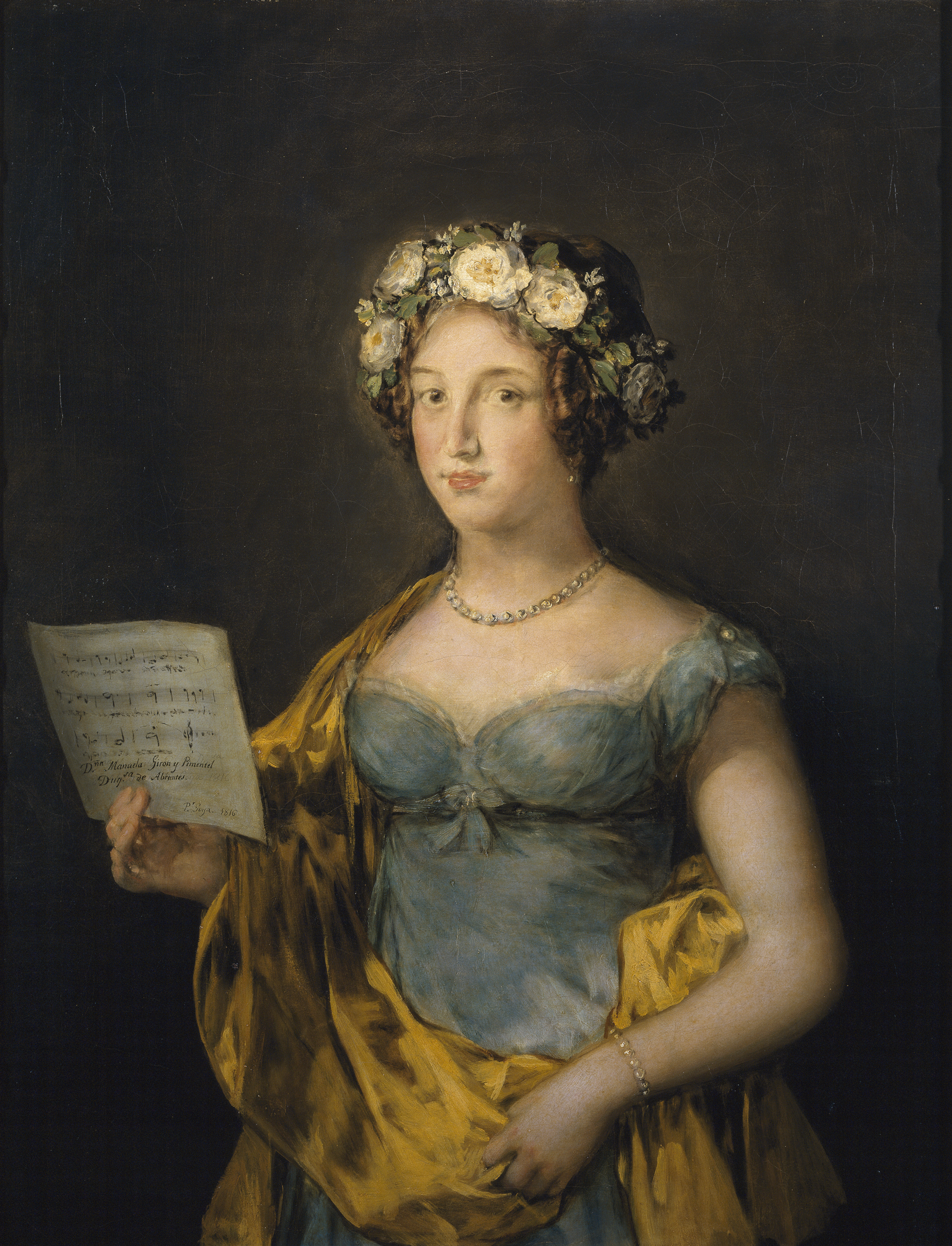
The Duchess of Abrantes (1816)

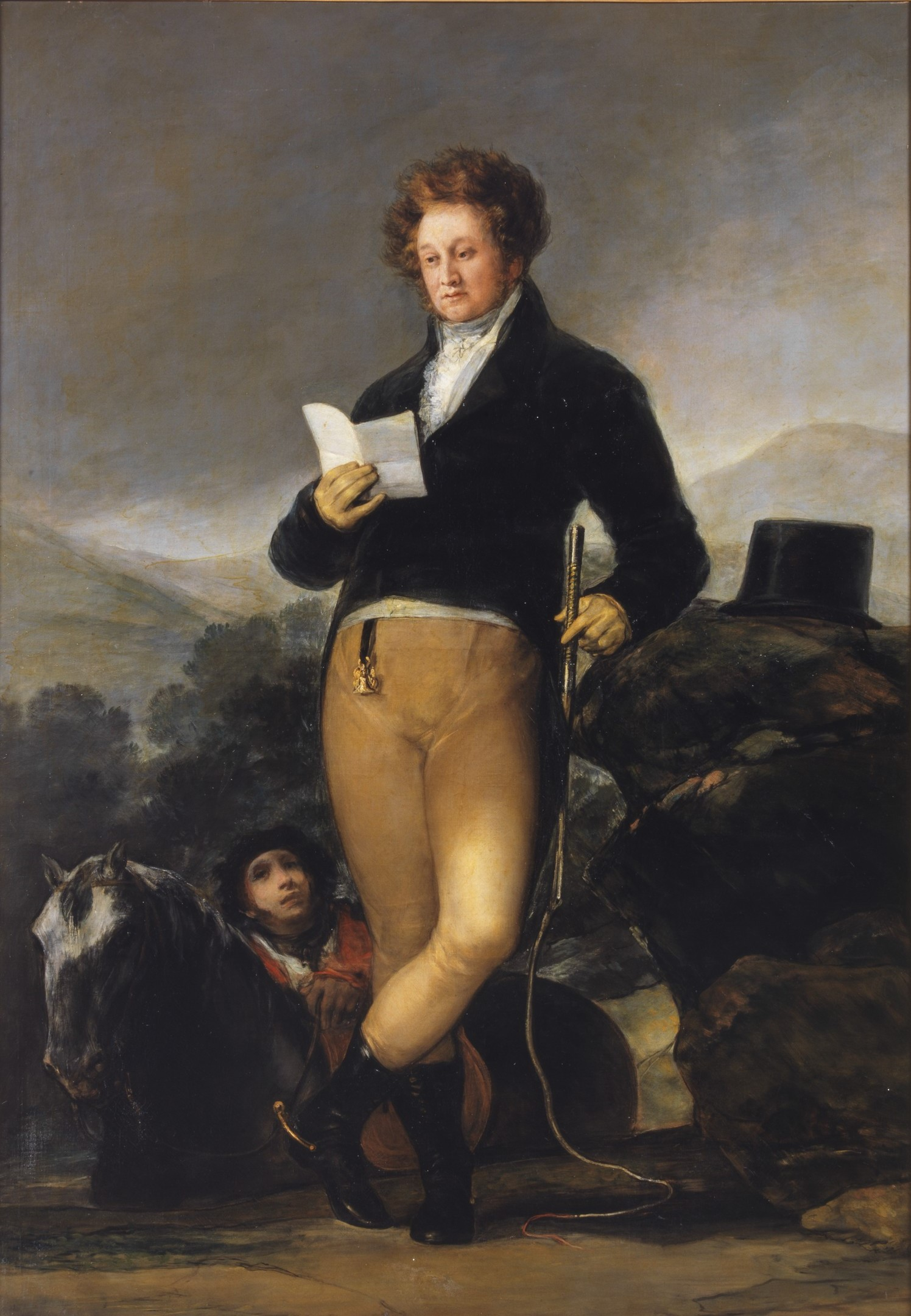
The 10th Duke of Osuna (1816)

== Ancestors ==
Ancestors of Pedro Téllez-Girón, 9th Duke of Osuna

16. Juan Tellez-Girón y Enriquez de Ribera, 4th Duke of Osuna
8. Gaspar Tellez-Girón y Sandoval, 5th Duke of Osuna
17. Isabel de Sandoval y Padilla
4. José María Téllez-Girón, 7th Duke of Osuna
18. Luis Francisco de Benavides Carrillo de Toledo, 5th Marquis of Frómista
9. Ana Antonia de Benavides y Ponce de Leon, 6th Marchioness of Frómista
19. Catalina Ponce de León y Fernández de Córdoba
2. Pedro Téllez-Girón, 8th Duke of Osuna
20. Juan Claros Pérez de Guzmán, 11th Duke of Medina Sidonia
10. Manuel Pérez de Guzmán, 12th Duke of Medina Sidonia
21. Teresa Pimentel y Benavides
5. Francisca Pérez de Guzmán y Mendoza
22. Gregorio María de Silva y Mendoza, 9th Duke of the Infantado
11. Luisa Maria de Silva y Mendez de Haro
23. María Mendez de Haro y Fernandez de Cordoba
1. Pedro Téllez-Girón, 9th Duke of Osuna
24. Francisco Pacheco Tellez Giron, 5th Count of Puebla de Montalban
12. Manuel Gaspar Téllez Girón, 5th Duke of Uceda
25. Isabel Tellez Giron, 4th Duchess of Uceda
6. Francisco Pacheco Téllez-Girón, 6th Duke of Uceda
26. Manuel Joaquin de Toledo y Portugal, 8th Count of Oropesa
13. Josefa Antonia Alvarez de Toledo
27. Isabel María Téllez Girón
3. María Vicenta Pacheco Téllez-Girón
28. Gaspar Tellez-Girón y Sandoval, 5th Duke of Osuna (= 8)
14. Francisco María de Paula Téllez-Girón, 6th Duke of Osuna
29. Ana Antonia de Benavides y Ponce de Leon, 6th Marchioness of Frómista (= 9)
7. María Lucia Tellez-Girón y Fernandez de Velasco
30. Íñigo Melchor de Velasco, 7th Duke of Frías
15. María del Pilar Fernandez de Velasco y Benavides, 9th Duchess of Frías
31. María Teresa de Benavídes Dávila y Corella

== See also ==
- Paintings for the alameda of the Dukes of Osuna

== Bibliography ==
- Hobbs, Nicolas (2007). "Grandes de España" (in Spanish). Archived from the original on October 25, 2008.
- Instituto de Salazar y Castro. Elenco de Grandezas y Titulos Nobiliarios Españoles. periodic publication.

Academic offices
Preceded by José Miguel de Flores	Seat T of The Royal Spanish Academy; 1787–1807	Succeeded by Demetrio Ortiz
Spanish nobility
Preceded by Pedro Téllez-Girón	Duke of Osuna; 1787–1807	Succeeded by Francisco Téllez-Girón
