= The Duke and Duchess of Osuna and their Children =

Painting by Francisco Goya

- Los duques de Osuna y sus hijos (Spanish)
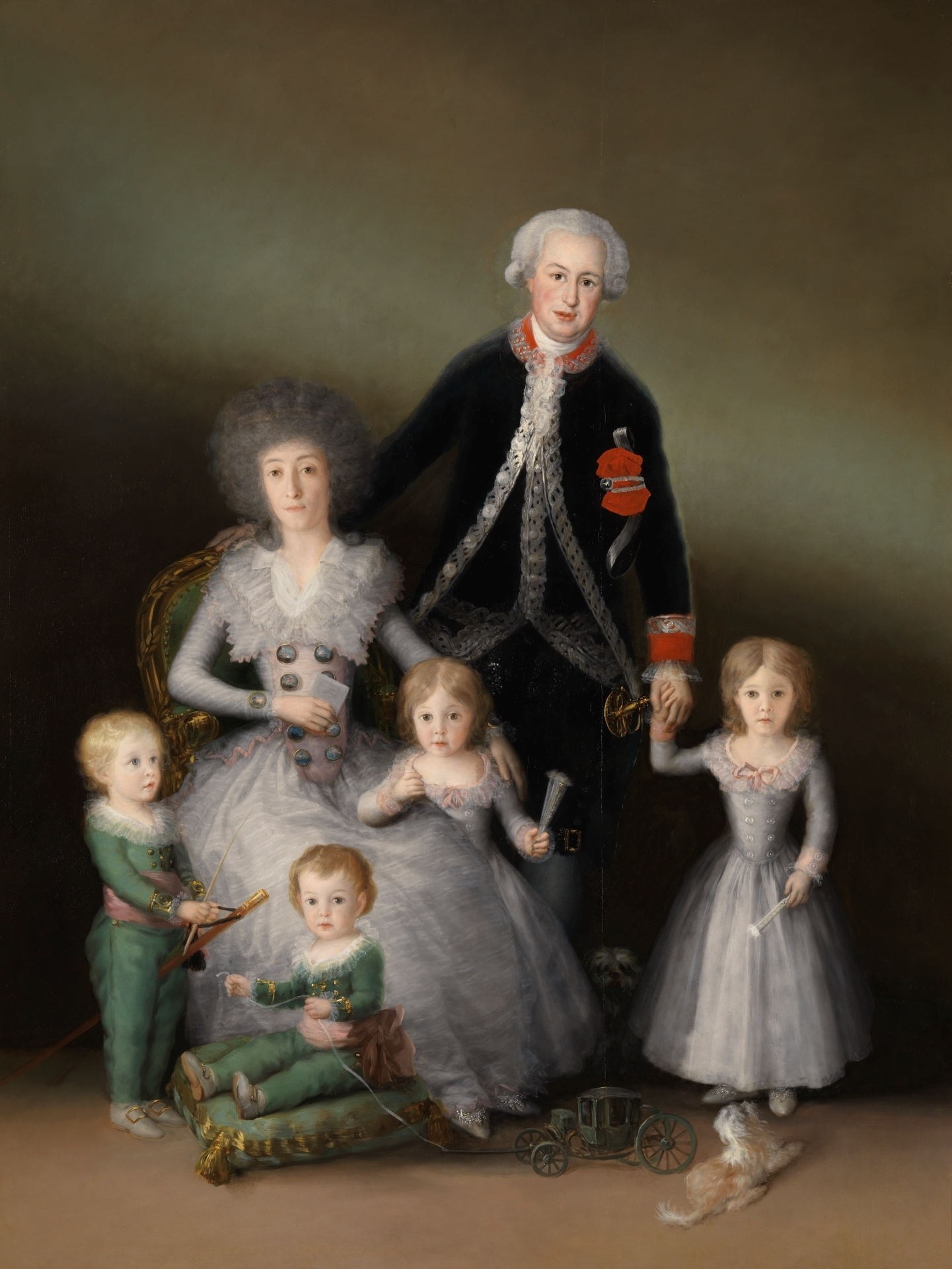
- Artist: Francisco Goya
- Year: 1787–1788
- Medium: Oil on unlined canvas
- Subject: Pedro Téllez-Girón, 9th Duke of Osuna, María Josefa Pimentel, Duchess of Osuna and family
- Dimensions: 225 cm × 174 cm (89 in × 69 in)
- Location: Museo del Prado; Madrid

The Duke and Duchess of Osuna and their Children is a family group painting by the Spanish painter Francisco Goya. It is held in the Museo del Prado, in Madrid.

== Background ==
Pedro Téllez-Girón, 9th Duke of Osuna and María Josefa Pimentel, Duchess of Osuna were among the country's leading ilustrados and important patrons of the arts and, specifically, of Goya, commissioning several paintings from him.

Goya would later portray, as La duquesa de Abrantes (1816), their youngest daughter, Manuela Isidra, who had not yet been born at the time of the sitting for the family portrait.

== Description ==
=== Subject ===
The Duke, dressed in the uniform of a brigadier of his regiment and in mourning for the recent death of his father, Pedro Téllez-Girón, 8th Duke of Osuna, stands to his seated wife's left, his right hand on the back of the chair, and holding the hand of their eldest daughter, Josefa Manuela.

The Duchess, whom Goya had already portrayed in 1785, is dressed in the latest French fashion, and seated with her youngest daughter, the Marchioness of Santa Cruz, whom Goya would later portray in an allegorical portrait in 1805, (Note: The Marchioness was, by then, married to José Gabriel de Silva-Bazán, the Marquis of Santa Cruz, who would go on to become the first director of the Prado Museum. Her younger brother, Pedro de Alcántara, the future Prince of Anglona, portrayed here seated on the cushion, would later take over the Marquis's post at the Prado.) in her lap.

On his mother's right, the eldest son, Francisco de Borja, stands astride a headless hobby horse. Goya would portray him again in 1816. (Note: The portraits of Francisco and Manuela Isidra Téllez-Girón would be Goya's last portraits of aristocrats. (Fundación Goya.))

Seated on the cushion, at his mother's feet, Pedro de Alcántara, is portrayed here holding the string of a large pull toy carriage.

=== Composition ===
The social status of the males and the male hierarchy is shown clearly in the pyramidal composition of this painting.

The Duke is standing, his head at the top of the pyramid, while the Duchess is seated, with her sons to the left of the group, to draw the viewer's eye.

Goya is clearly influenced by Mengs in how the group is organised in a pyramid as well as in the variety of postures. The influence of Velázquez is clear in the use of space, the apparent presence of walls and floor, without actually showing them, with the use of light and shade. Goya makes the figures come to life by making the Duke lean slightly to one side, with the intense stares of the children and the presence of the two dogs, making this a "typically amusing Goya animation", and which, according to Nigel Glendinning, "gives the painting a strong sensation of mometaneousness so typical of both Velázquez and Goya".
