= Conspiracy of the Duke of Medina Sidonia (1641) =

Conspiracy of Andalusian nobility to secede from Spain

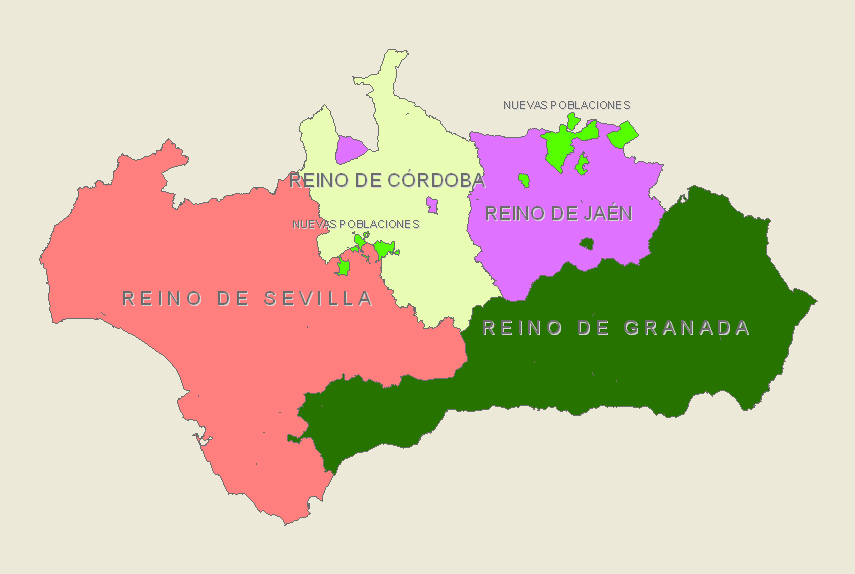
In 1641, Andalusian nobles conspired against King Philip IV.

In 1641, the ninth Duke of Medina Sidonia and the sixth Marquis of Ayamonte allegedly conspired to set up the duke as an independent king of Andalusia, inspired by the Portuguese revolt of 1640. The conspiracy was brought to an end in summer 1641 after the plans of rebellion were discovered.

After more than three-and-a-half centuries, aspects of the episode remain unclear, and controversy about the conspiracy remains.

== The questionable nature of the conspiracy ==
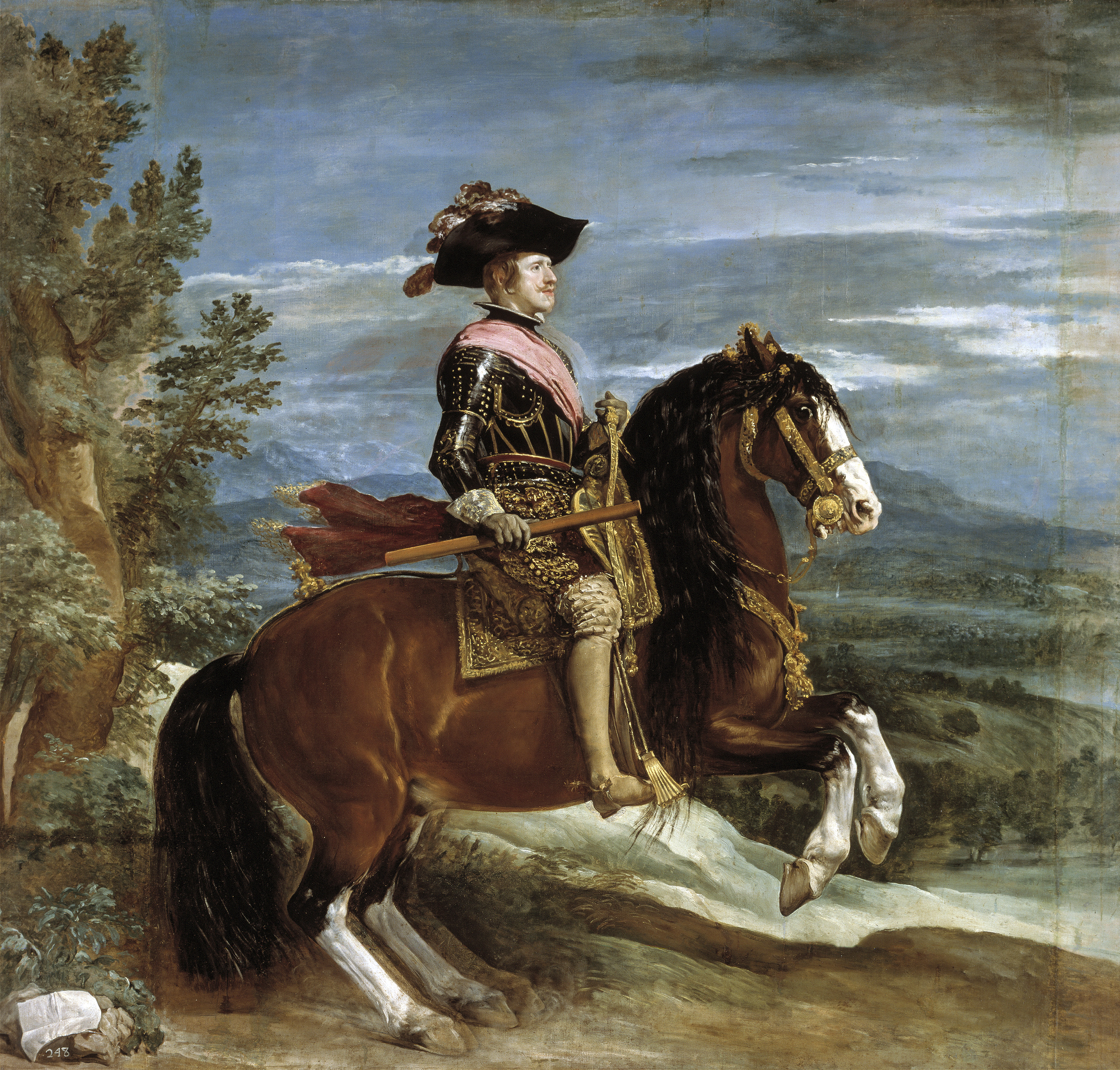
Philip IV, portrayed by Diego de Velázquez.

Because the conspiracy was cut short, the true motives and ideas of the Andalusian nobles remain less than clear. The traditional interpretation is that nobles seeking power for themselves united in a secessionist movement similar to the movement in Portugal and the one in Catalonia.

Another possibility is that they wanted to remove the king's favorite Gaspar de Guzmán, Count-Duke of Olivares from the government, to solve the economic crisis caused by Spain's ambitions in Europe, lower taxes, and hand back a healthier Andalusia to Philip. Their intent may have been a coup d'état originating in Andalusia, but not necessarily independentist in intent.

Luisa Isabel Álvarez de Toledo, descendant of the duke and 21st holder of the title of the dukedom of Medina Sidonia, proposes yet another possibility: that there never was a conspiracy among these powerful Andalusian nobles, and that this was all a projection of the Count-Duke of Olivares provoked by envy that the king's favorite felt for the Duke of Medina Sidonia: the Count-Duke was a member of the House of Olivares, a minor branch of the House of Medina Sidonia. According to this theory, the Duke of Medina Sidonia never attacked Portugal, not because of a pact with his brother-in-law, the Portuguese king, but because of the weakness of the Spanish army on the Huelva frontier, a mere 3,000 men.

== The alleged conspirators ==
=== Gaspar Alonso Pérez de Guzmán y Sandoval ===
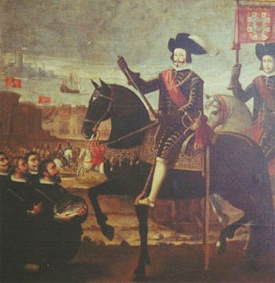
Gaspar Alonso Pérez de Guzmán, Ninth Duke of Medina Sidonia.

The Ninth Duke of Medina Sidonia, the man accused of conspiring against Philip IV, represented the main branch of the House of Medina Sidonia, the leading noble family of Andalusia by virtue of its historical importance and vast fortune. He became Duke of Medina Sidonia upon the death of his father in 1636; at that time he was 33 years old and was married to his own aunt, Ana de Guzmán.

Despite his immense family fortune, the finances of the dukedom went through a difficult period, requiring him to undertake numerous loans. The duke had run up massive expenses by his high style of living in the years before the death of his father, and had feted Philip IV with great luxury in 1624 when the latter visited the Coto de Doñana.

Upon assuming the dukedom, Gaspar Alonso also held the military charge of Captain General of the Ocean Sea and Coasts of Andalusia (Spanish: Capitán General del Mar Océano y Costas de Andalucía), which made him military governor of the region from the Guadiana to the Strait of Gibraltar. In the exercise of these functions, he was called upon to fight against the 1637 Portuguese rebellion in the Algarve, led by the Duke of Braganza (later John IV of Portugal), who, in 1632, had contracted a marriage with Luisa de Guzmán, Gaspar Alonso's sister.

=== Francisco Manuel Silvestre de Guzmán y Zúñiga ===
Francisco Manuel Silvestre de Guzmán y Zúñiga was Sixth Marquis of Ayamonte and a member of another branch of the powerful Guzmán family. Born in 1606, he was the holder of a poor seigneury with very limited resources. His prodigality had led to such a state of indebtedness that, since 1636, the administration of his income had been assumed by the Council of Castile. He also took part in the fight against the rebellious Portuguese.

== The Portuguese Restoration War and the Guzmanes ==
Although the issue of the Portuguese Restoration War is separate from that of Andalusian independentism, it is impossible to understand either without considering the other.

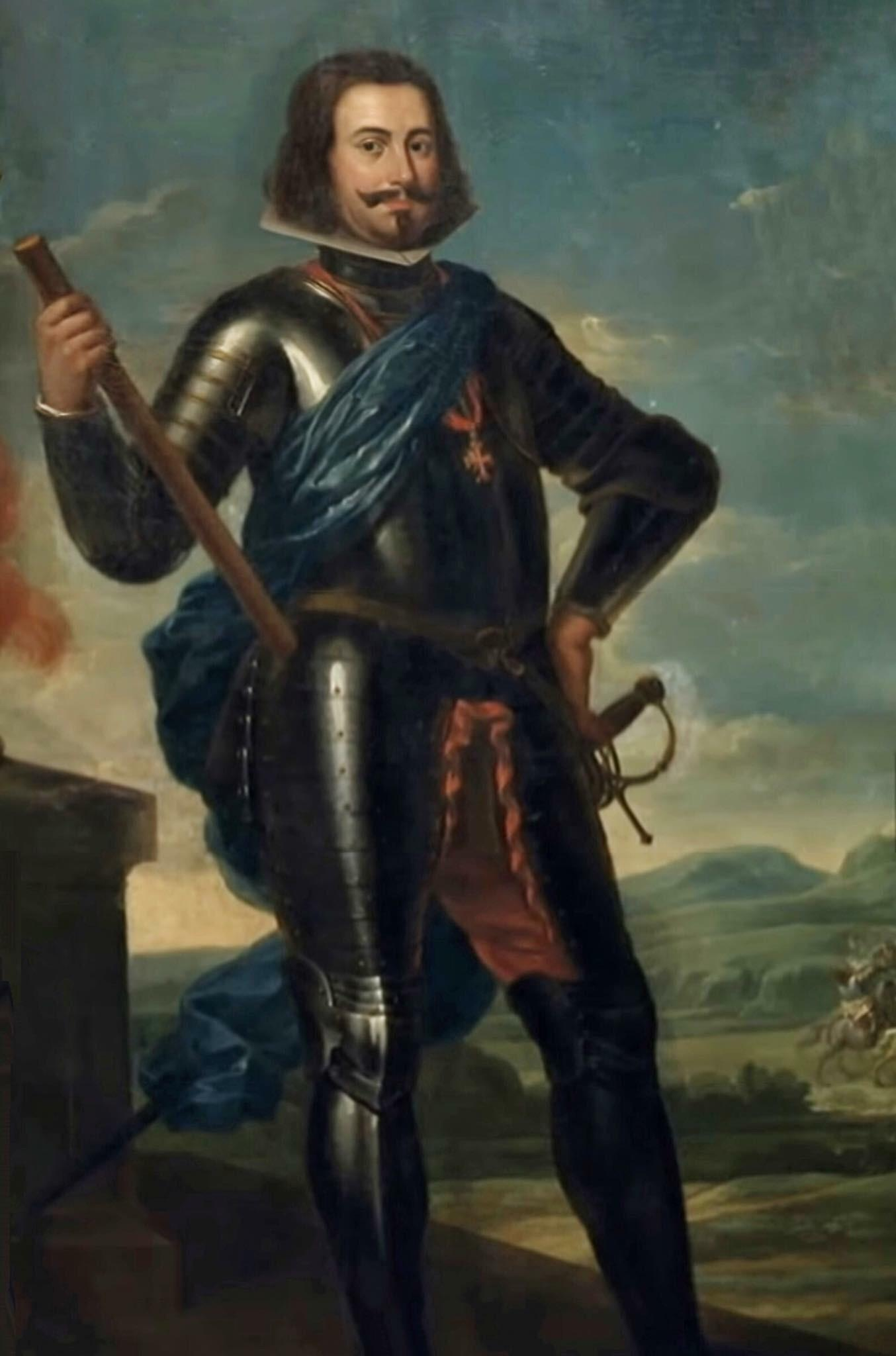
Portrait of John IV of Portugal.

The plot for Andalusian independence cannot be entirely separated from the successful uprising that led to the Portuguese restoration of independence. Certainly the historically prevailing view is that each supported the other. It would appear that the Marquis of Ayamonte advised his political cousin, John, Duke of Braganza, of the operation that was afoot to restore the Crown of Portugal to king Philip, and that the Portuguese king offered his support to Medina Sidonia and Ayamonte to conspire, not so much against the King of Spain as against the Count-Duke of Olivares. Given the limited capabilities of the shattered army of Olivares, if the conspiracy had not been betrayed it could well have achieved its objective. The Portuguese revolution took place on 1 December 1640. In the summer of 1641, the Andalusian conspiracy was discovered. The closeness of the dates could hardly be more eloquently on behalf of the theory that there was, indeed, a conspiracy, and that it had Portuguese support.

The first Portuguese uprising began on 21 August 1637, suppressed in early 1638 by Margaret of Savoy, Vicereine of Portugal, Duchess of Mantua, daughter of Charles Emmanuel I, Duke of Savoy and niece of Philip II of Spain.

A new uprising occurred in 1640, with the Portuguese nobles killing Miguel de Vasconcelos, taking the vicereine prisoner, and crowning John of Braganza as king of Portugal at Évora, establishing the House of Braganza that would rule Portugal for the next two centuries. December 1, 1640, Philip IV and Olivares began to prepare for the reconquest of Portugal from the Ayamonte frontier.

In Madrid, the Duke of Medina Sidonia was named captain general of an army that was to attack the Portuguese from Andalusia. For that purpose, the duke traveled to Ayamonte, where he established his headquarters and gave orders to bring together, from various places in Andalusia, an army of ten thousand men. Nonetheless, the concentration of the army was carried out with excruciating slowness, even apathy, such as when the duke rejected the troops sent by García Sarmiento de Sotomayor, 2nd Count of Salvatierra, then the Assistante of Seville, alleging that this army lacks various things that Madrid needs to provide. At the very least, this was a strange attitude. The assumption would be that he accepted only three thousand troops to garrison the border because his plan was not to attack Portugal, where his sister was now the queen. Doubtless his passive attitude was of no assistance to the few pro-Habsburg nobles within Portugal.

Suspicions began to form that the duke was intending an uprising of his own to separate Andalusia from Spain. According to the conventional view of the conspiracy the idea first came from the Marquis of Ayamonte, who was connected with the Duke through a series of contacts. The plan counted on the support of Portugal and the collaboration of the French and Dutch fleets.

Continuing to follow this same version of the events, the plotting led to many comings and goings over the Portuguese frontier, and grave rumors about Ayamonte began to circulate. In the summer of 1641, a special envoy from Madrid, Antonio de Isasi, intercepted a letter from Ayamonte to Medina Sidonia and sent it to court; the letter revealed the plot.

Others who gave information at court about the conspiracy were Fray Nicolás de Velasco and Fray Luis de las Llagas. There was also an incriminatory declaration by Francisco Sánchez Márquez, president of the Accounting Office of Auditors (Spanish: Contaduría Mayor de Cuentas), who said that while in prison in Portugal he had heard a conversation between Fray Nicolás de Velasco (who was posing as a prisoner to gain information) and a mason who again had overheard two servants in the palace of the Duke of Braganza discussing that an armada prepared to conquer Cádiz. Granted his liberty and returned to Castile, Márquez revealed all to the Count-Duke of Olivares.

== The conspiracy exposed ==
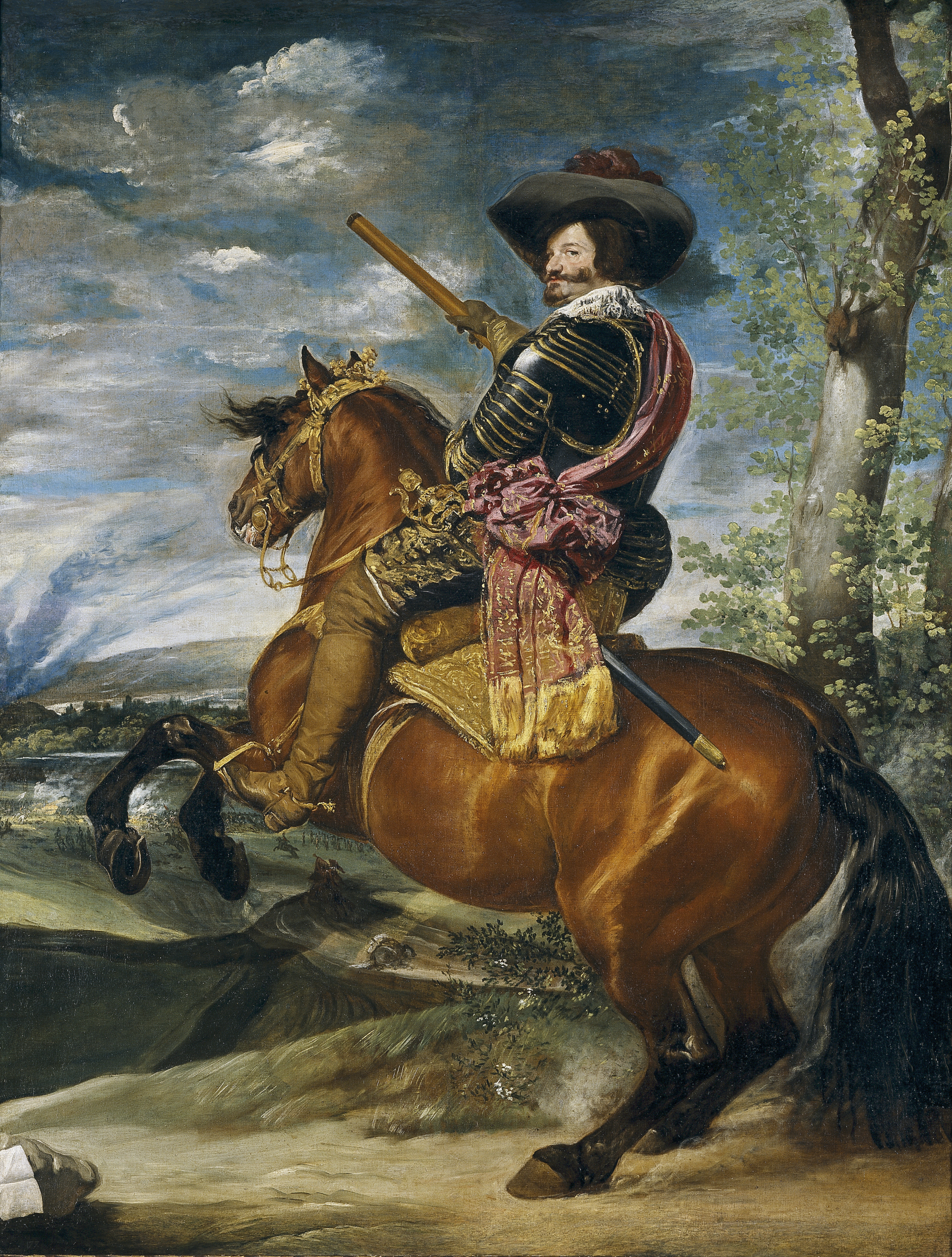
The Count-Duke of Olivares, portrayed by Diego de Velázquez.

Continuing the conventional view of the conspiracy: while Medina Sidonia an Ayamonte awaited notice from Portugal about the presence of a French-Dutch fleet to collaborate and begin the uprising, he was called to court. Playing for time, he excused himself citing reasons of health. The news from Portugal suggested the imminent arrival of the fleet. He took advantage of the days gained by the excuse to enter into contact with Rodrigo Ponce de León, 4th Duke of Arcos, his mother-in-law the Marquesa of Priego, the Bishop of Jaen, and Rodrigo Díaz de Vivar Sandoval y Mendoza, Duke of Infantado, sounding out their views on a possible uprising. They refused to participate in what they saw as a cause already lost due to lack of support among the nobility, the failure of the popular masses to rebel despite supposed support from Seville and Jerez de la Frontera and a general malaise among the people, and the failure of the French and Dutch fleets to arrive.

Luis de Haro, eventual successor to the Count-Duke of Olivares as the king's favorite, was sent from the court to Andalusia to find out how far-reaching the ramifications of the plot were, and to arrest Medina Sidonia. He traveled from Madrid to Córdoba in forty hours. There, he met with numerous nobles and received many messages. His impression was that the upper nobility were tranquil, but there was an inquietude among the lower nobility.

Advised of the arrival of this royal emissary and to avoid the scandal of imprisonment, Medina Sidonia left swiftly for Madrid, where he visited the Count-Duke and confessed his conspiracy, apparently taken in by the attitude of Olivares, who made him believe he would use all his influence to defend his life, his home, and his credit.

== Responsibility and punishments ==
After the interview, the Count-Duke showed Medina Sidonia's confession of culpability to the king, from which the chief notary of the kingdom selected written testimony. In it, he incriminated the Marquis of Ayamonte of having induced him into this course of action, while denying any intention of declaring himself king of Andalusia.

The Marquis of Ayamonte refused to come to court of his own accord, and was taken prisoner. He was brought to the Alcázar of Seville and then to Illescas, where he was interrogated October 6, 1641. He was interrogated again June 8, 1643, in the fortified Castle of Torremocha (Santorcaz), after which he was taken to Pinto southeast of Madrid and finally to the Alcázar of Segovia, which offered greater control and security. He admitted his guilt as a conspirator, but placed the primary responsibility on the Duke, who he claimed he would not have permitted to proclaim himself king of Andalusia and who he had supported only in the creation of an Andalusian republic. After a lengthy trial, he was condemned to death and confiscation of his wealth and goods. The Duke of Medina Sidonia could do no more than to send 4,016 reales by way of Luis del Castillo to the Alcázar of Segovia to make sure that his cousin the Marquis did not want for anything material.

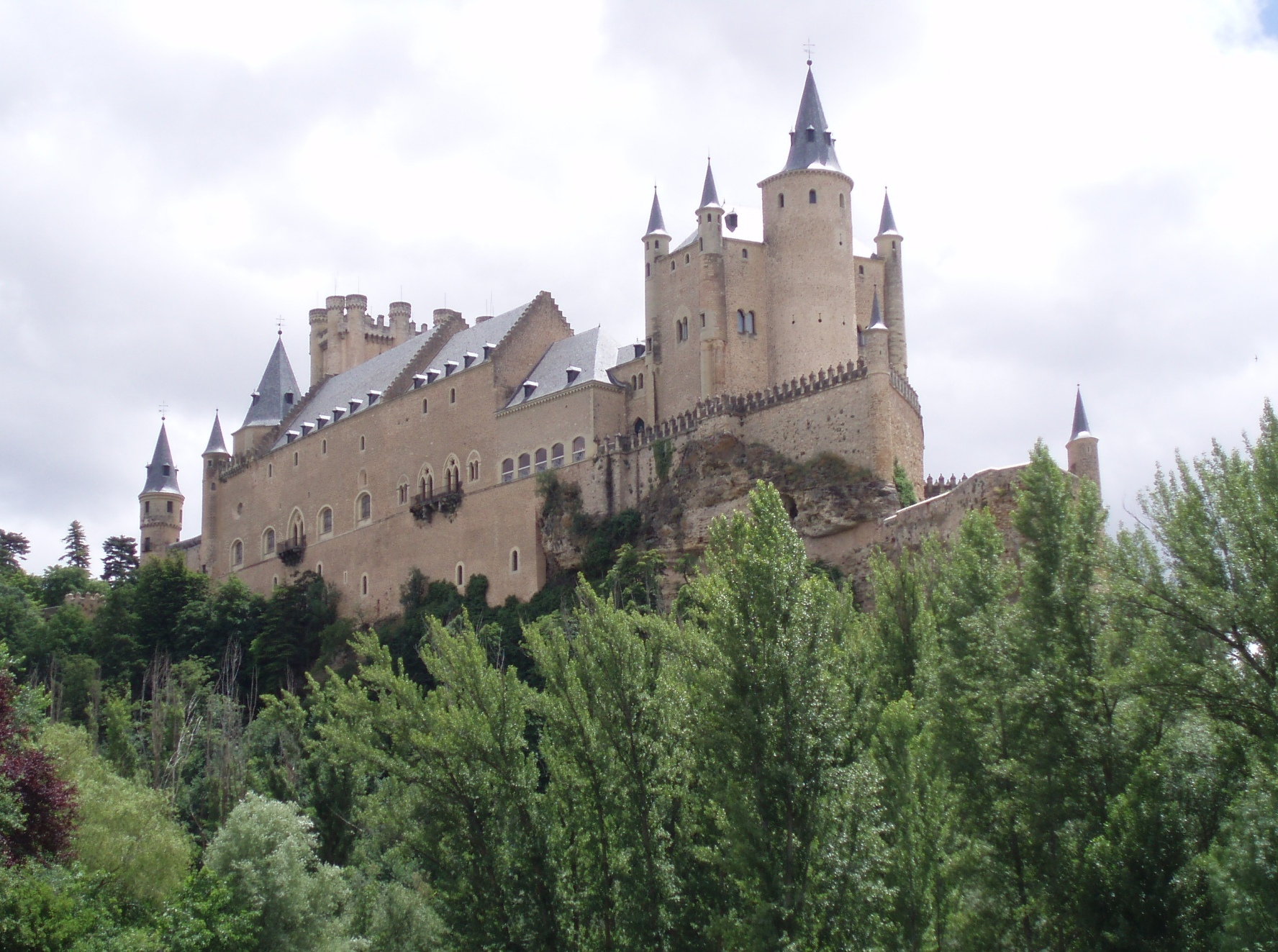
The present-day Alcázar of Segovia, significantly rebuilt in the 19th century.

It was recommended to the King Philip that the death sentence be commuted to life imprisonment and confiscation; the king acted accordingly, but in 1648, upon discovering the conspiracy of to make the Duke of Híjar into the king of Aragon the death sentence was carried out on the belief that the same forces were conspiring in Aragon. The Marquis was beheaded as a traitor December 12, 1648, at the Alcázar of Segovia as an example to others who would conspire against the centralizing power of Spain.

Attempting to rehabilitate his image, Medina Sidonia had the bizarre idea of challenging the King of Portugal to single combat, summoning him to meet at the Portuguese border near Valencia de Alcántara within a certain period of time. The Duke and his entourage traveled there and waited uselessly for 80 days, from October 1 to December 19, 1641.

Because of the Duke's great rank and fortune, Philip IV did not condemn him to death, but neither did he forget. He was exiled from court and never obtained permission to return to his Andalusian dominions. When he did so without permission, he was arrested and imprisoned in the Castle of Coca. He was deprived of the Seigneury of Sanlúcar, which reverted to the Crown, and in 1645 was deprived of the title of Captain General of the Coasts of Andalusia, which passed to the rival ducal family of the Medinaceli. He was also fined 200,000 ducats as a "generous donation" ("generoso donativo") to the king.

His natural son Alonso (or Alfonso) Pérez de Guzmán y Marañón was granted the right to the family name by serving the king at sea, although always far from Andalusia, first as Corregidor of Cuzco in Peru, then as Captain General of the galleys of Sardinia and finally as Viceroy of Valencia.

== Reasons for failure ==
The conspiracy—presuming, of course that it existed—appears to have failed because the conspirators could not pull together the resources and the allies they needed. The focus on external support—from Portugal, France, and the Netherlands—suggests a lack of internal support, despite the apparent malaise of wide swaths of Andalusian society at the time.

The conspiracy, which we can consider as a plot among the nobility, could not count on the popular masses, and their contacts seem to have been limited largely to the nobility, although at least one source says they were expecting support from the people of Seville and Jerez de la Frontera.

The weakness of the monarchy at the time was patent to anyone who chose to look. The rapid success of the Catalan and Portuguese rebels, the perception of widespread malaise, and the promise of help from abroad would certainly have encouraged the conspirators. But Medina Sidonia and Ayamonte were living in a mirage; in Catalonia and Portugal there was stronger popular support for independence movements than in Andalucía, where independence would perhaps have been more difficult to achieve, and may not even have been attempted.

Even in the delicate situation after the independence of the Netherlands and the restoration of independence of Portugal, the Catalan Revolt and the economic crisis (caused by military expenses, failures within the royal administration, and even traitorous activity within that last), Olivares' astuteness was such that the conspirators could not avoid leaks. The Count-Duke ended the matter by calling the two leaders to Madrid.

An anonymous letter without an addressee in the Spanish archives says that the three who betrayed the conspiracy (Fray Nicolás de Velasco, Fray Luis de las Llagas, and Francisco Sánchez Márquez) received important benefits: the first 2,000 ducats and an honorable position in the Atlantic armada, the second a plaza de contador and a knighthood in a military order, and the third another knighthood and the position of veedor general (roughly inspector general) of the army in Portugal.
