= Pedro de Alcántara Alonso Pérez de Guzmán, 14th Duke of Medina Sidonia =

Duke of Medina Sidonia

The Most Excellent Pedro Pérez de Guzmán 14th Duke of Medina Sidonia GE
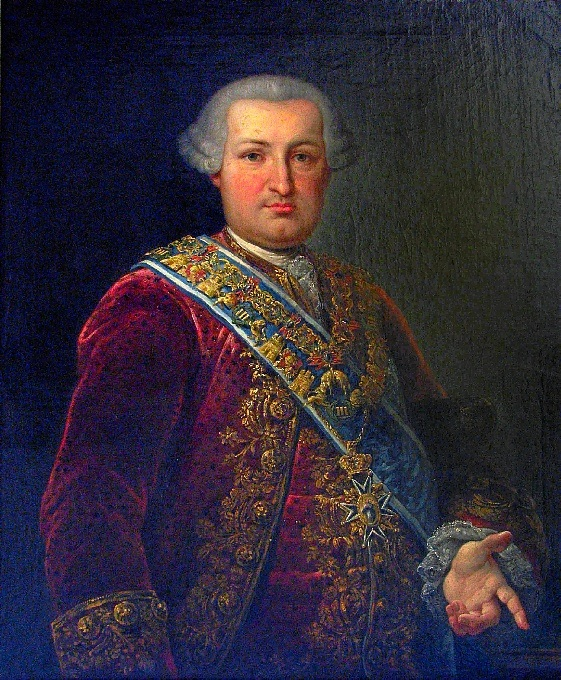
- Born: Pedro de Alcántara Alonso Pérez de Guzmán y Lopez-Pacheco; 25 August 1724
- Died: 6 January 1779 (aged 54)
- Title: Duke of Medina Sidonia
- Predecessor: 13th Duke of Medina Sidonia
- Successor: 15th Duke of Medina Sidonia
- Spouse: Mariana de Silva y Álvarez de Toledo
- Parents: Domingo José Claros Pérez de Guzmán (father); Josefa Fenicula López Pacheco y Moscoso-Osorio (mother)

Seat L of the Real Academia Española
- In office 31 May 1752 – 6 January 1779
- Preceded by: Francisco de la Huerta y Vega
- Succeeded by: José Guevara Vasconcelos

Pedro de Alcántara Alonso Pérez de Guzmán y Lopez-Pacheco, 14th Duke of Medina Sidonia (Madrid, 25 August 1724 – Vilafranca del Penedès, 6 January 1779) was a Spanish noble who became Duke of Medina Sidonia in 1739.

== Biography ==
His parents were Domingo José Claros Pérez de Guzmán, 13th Duke of Medina Sidonia and Josefa Fenicula López Pacheco y Moscoso-Osorio (1703–1763), daughter of the 9th Duke of Escalona.

He was married on 22 October 1743, aged 19, to Mariana de Silva y Álvarez de Toledo, whose mother was María Teresa Álvarez de Toledo Haro, and 11th Duchess of Alba de Tormes in her own right.
He became a Knight of the Order of the Golden Fleece in 1753, aged 29. He was also Caballerizo mayor to King Charles III.

He was elected a Fellow of the Royal Society in November 1749.

On the death of his cousin María Ana López Pacheco, XIV Marquise of Aguilar de Campoo in 1768, he inherited all her titles. Pedro de Alcántara also died without issue, and all his titles passed to his second nephew José Álvarez de Toledo.

Spanish nobility
Preceded by Domingo José Claros Pérez de Guzmán	Duke of Medina Sidonia; 1739–1779	Succeeded by José Álvarez de Toledo, Duke of Alba
