= Gaspar Juan Pérez de Guzmán, 10th Duke of Medina Sidonia =

Duke of Medina Sidonia

Gaspar Juan Pérez de Guzmán y Guzmán, 10th Duke of Medina Sidonia (1630–1667) was Duke of Medina Sidonia from 1664 to 1667.

He married Antonia, daughter of Luis Méndez de Haro, 6th Marquis of Carpio. He died without issue, and the title passed to his younger half brother.

== Sources ==
- Real Academia de la Historia

Spanish nobility
Preceded by Gaspar Alfonso Pérez de Guzmán	Duke of Medina Sidonia; 1664–1667	Succeeded by Juan Claros Pérez de Guzmán
