= Pedro Téllez-Girón, 8th Duke of Osuna =

Pedro Zoilo Téllez-Girón y Pérez de Guzmán, 8th Duke de Osuna, Grandee of Spain, (Note: In full, Spanish: Don Pedro Zoilo María Bienvenido Juan Francisco Xavier Téllez-Girón y Pérez de Guzmán el Bueno, octavo duque de Osuna, octavo marqués de Peñafiel, décimo segundo conde de Ureña, señor de la villa de Morón de la Frontera, Archidona, El Arahal, Olvera, Ortejicar, Cazalla de la Sierra, Tiedra, Gumiel de Izán y Briones, Camarero mayor del Rey, Notario mayor de los Reinos de Castilla, Grande de España de 1ra clase, teniente general de los RE, coronel del Regimiento de Reales Guardias de infantería española y director general de ella, capitán de Guardias Albarderos de la persona de SM, del Supremo Consejo de Guerra, gentilhombre de cámara con ejercicio de Fernando VI y Carlos III, embajador extraordinario cerca del emperador de Alemania José II y en las Cortes de Nápoles, Parma y Turín, caballero del Toisón de Oro, gran cruz de la Orden de Carlos III)) (27 June 1728 – 1 April 1787), was a Spanish nobleman.

Pedro Téllez-Girón was the son of José María Téllez-Girón, 7th Duke of Osuna and of Francisca Pérez de Guzmán y Mendoza, daughter of Manuel Pérez de Guzmán, 12th Duke of Medina Sidonia. He married his niece María Vicenta Pacheco Téllez-Girón in 1753.

== Sources ==
- Hobbs, Nicolas (2007). "Grandes de España" (in Spanish). Archived from the original on October 25, 2008.
- Instituto de Salazar y Castro. Elenco de Grandezas y Titulos Nobiliarios Españoles (in Spanish). periodic publication.

Spanish nobility
Preceded by José María Téllez-Girón	Duke of Osuna; 1733–1787	Succeeded by Pedro Téllez-Girón
