= Pedro de Alcántara Téllez Girón =

Spanish military officer

Pedro Téllez Girón, Prince of Anglona
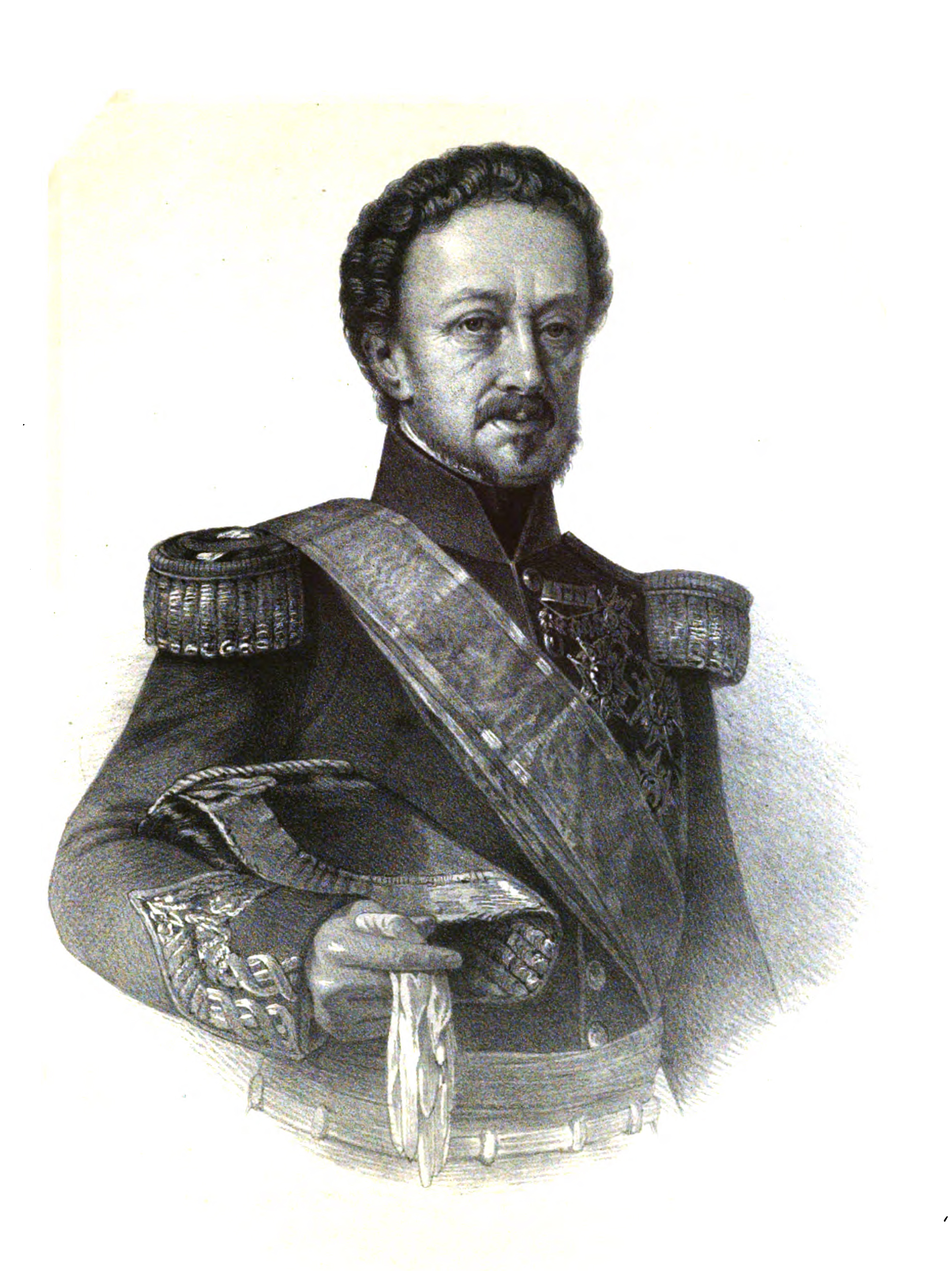
- Pedro Téllez Girón, Prince of Anglona (lithography, 1858)
- Born: 15 October 1786; Quiruelas de Vidriales, Zamora
- Died: 24 January 1851 (aged 64) Madrid
- Allegiance: Spain
- Conflicts: Peninsular War; Battle of Bailen; Battle of Tudela; Battle of Uclés; Battle of Tamames; Battle of Alba de Tormes; Battle of Barrosa; Battle of Bornos

Pedro de Alcántara Téllez Girón y Alfonso-Pimentel, 2nd Prince of Anglona (1786–1851) was a Spanish military officer during the Peninsular War and a politician.

He was the director of the Prado Museum between 1820 and 1823 and Captain General of Cuba (from January 1840 to March 1841). He was the 2nd Prince of Anglona in the peerage of Sardinia and the 9th Marquess of Jabalquinto in the peerage of Spain.

== Biography ==
=== Family life ===
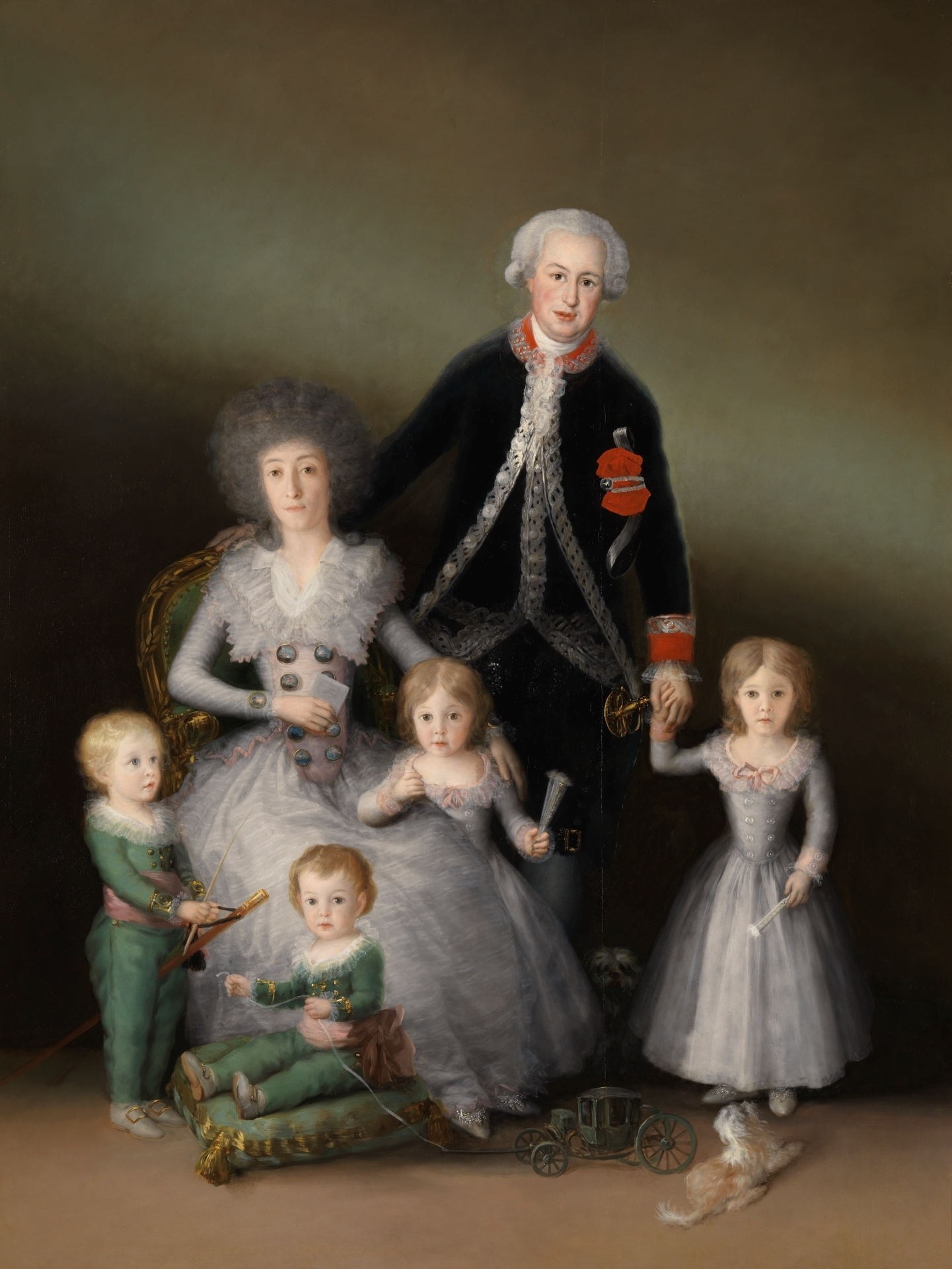
The Duke and Duchess of Osuna and their Children portrayed by Goya (c. 1788). (Note: The prince is seen seated on a cushion at the feet of his mother. (Alcolea Blanch.))

The prince was the youngest living son of Pedro Téllez-Girón, 9th Duke of Osuna and María Josefa Pimentel, Duchess of Osuna, leading patrons of the arts, and whom Francisco Goya painted on several occasions, including the well-known family portrait of the Duke and Duchess and their children that can be seen at the Prado Museum.

In 1811 he married María del Rosario Fernández de Santillán y Valdivia, daughter of the Marquis de Motilla.

=== Early career ===
In 1805, as a captain, Anglona was aide-de-camp to Gonzalo O'Farrill, commander-in-chief of the troops that accompanied Maria Luisa, Duchess of Lucca on her journey to take up the Regency of Kingdom of Etruria.

Promoted to lieutenant colonel of the Dragones del Rey in March 1807, on the dissolution the following month of the Etruria Division, Anglona returned to Madrid where, that same month, he was transferred to the Pavía Regiment. On the instructions of his colonel, he marched the regiment down to El Puerto de Santa María at the beginning of 1808.

=== Peninsular War ===
==== 1808 ====
Following the Dos de Mayo Uprising in Madrid and its consequences on the rest of the Peninsula, in Cádiz, (Note: The slaying of the city's captain general, General Solano (29 May) and the capture of the Rosily Squadron (14 June).) in July Anglona joined General Castaños's Army of Andalusia and was given the colonelcy of the Pavia Regiment, then a very well-equipped unit with 440 splendid horses, reason for which they were entrusted with the vanguard of Castaños's Army until Andújar. For the order of battle for the Battle of Bailen, Anglona's Pavia Regiment was attached to Lieutenant general Manuel la Peña's 4th (Reserve) Division.

He then fought at the Battle of Tudela (23 November).

==== 1809 ====
At the beginning of the year, Anglona fought at Battle of Uclés (13 January).

At Talavera (27–28 July), Anglona served under Duke of Alburquerque and the following August was at the rout of the Spanish forces at Arzobispo (8 August).

Anglona was promoted to field marshal in August 1809.

Having been ordered to transfer his three cavalry regiments (Borbon, Sagunto and Granaderos de Llerena), numbering 1,053 men and 83 officers, from Cuesta's old Army of Extremadura to beef up the existing cavalry division of 500 men and 46 officers of newly formed Army of the Left, under Duke del Parque, Anglona reached Ciudad Rodrigo at the end of September and went on to lead the Cavalry Division at the Battle of Tamames (18 October). Shortly thereafter, he was appointed commander-in-chief of Cavalry of the Army of Catalonia, post which he was unable to take up due to the events of the following weeks.

Anglona saw further action at Alba de Tormes (28 November). He then headed down towards Cádiz with the idea of sailing for Catalonia to take up his command.

==== 1810 ====
The events leading up to the siege of Cádiz led to General Castaños suspending Anglona's departure from the city, and when the Duke of Alburquerque's troops arrived at San Fernando in January, Anglona was transferred to his command and given the command of the 2nd Division, tasked with the defence of the Arsenal de la Carraca, a strategic naval base in the Bay of Cádiz.

==== 1811 ====
As part of La Peña's expedition to Tarifa, Anglona then sailed with his Cavalry division, comprising two battalions each of the Africa and Cantabria regiments, and one battalion each of the regiments of Sigüenza and the Volunteers of Valencia, which fought at the Battle of Barrosa (5 March).

==== 1812 ====
In April, Anglona served under General Francisco Ballesteros in the 4th Army, and was given command of the 3rd Division, known as the "Asturian Division".

In May, his division fought at Bornos (31 May), where it lost over 1,000 men, killed or wounded.

That September Anglona liberated Granada.

On 30 October 1812, he was sent by the Cortes to arrest Ballesteros who, earlier that month, had called for a military uprising in protest against Wellington's appointment as generalissimo of the Spanish Army.

==== 1814 ====
By April 1814, he was commander-in-chief of Spain's 3rd Army as it crossed into France to occupy Pau.

=== Post-war career ===
With the arrival of the Liberal Triennium in 1820, he replaced his brother-in-law José Gabriel de Silva-Bazán y Waldstein, Marquis of Santa Cruz, as Director of the Prado Museum until 1823, when he had to take refuge in Italy after the French invaded the country.

He was Governor of Cuba from 7 September 1839 to March 1841.

He was elected vice-president of the Senate of Spain over four consecutive legislatures (1847-1848, 1848-1849, 1849-1850 and 1850-1851), (Note: The apparent discrepancy between his biography at the Royal Academy of History and his file at the Senate is due to the fact that for the first of those legislatures he was 2nd vice-president.) on each occasion under the presidency of his friend and biographer, Manuel de Pando Fernández de Pinedo, Marquis of Miraflores.

He was Director of the Real Academia de Bellas Artes de San Fernando from 1849 until his death in 1851.

== See also ==
- Grandee of Spain
