= Domingo José Claros Pérez de Guzmán, 13th Duke of Medina Sidonia =

Spanish Duke (1691–1739)

The Most Excellent Domingo José Pérez de Guzmán 13th Duke of Medina Sidonia GE
- Born: Domingo José Claros Pérez de Guzmán y de Silva; 21 November 1691; Madrid, Spain
- Died: 17 August 1739 (aged 47); Madrid, Spain
- Title: Duke of Medina Sidonia
- Predecessor: 12th Duke of Medina Sidonia
- Successor: 14th Duke of Medina Sidonia
- Spouse: Josefa Fenicula López Pacheco y Moscoso-Osorio

Domingo José Claros Pérez de Guzmán y de Silva, 13th Duke of Medina Sidonia (1691–1739) became Duke of Medina Sidonia in 1721.

== Biography ==
He was the son of Manuel Pérez de Guzmán, 12th Duke of Medina Sidonia and Luisa María de Silva y Mendoza, daughter of the V Duke of Pastrana.

In 1722, he married Josefa Fenicula López Pacheco y Moscoso-Osorio, a daughter of Mercurio Antonio López Pacheco y Portugal, 9th Marqués de Villena, 9th Duke of Escalona, Grandee of Spain, Captain General of the Spanish Royal Army, and Director of the Royal Spanish Academy, which he had founded in 1713. They had one son :

- Pedro de Alcántara Alonso Pérez de Guzmán (1724-1779)

One of his sisters, Juana, gained much wealth and power in 1713 by marrying Fadrique Vicente Álvarez de Toledo, the 9th Marquis of Villafranca del Bierzo, Grandee of Spain, Duke of Fernandina, Duke of Montalto, and Prince of Montalbano and Paternò.

The Duke became a Knight of the Order of the Golden Fleece in 1724.

Diagnosed as a hypochondriac, he rented the Bobadilla house and forest nearby, where he withdrew as soon as he had the opportunity, preferring the conversation with the friars to the buzz of the Royal court.

== Sources ==
Real Academia de la Historia

Spanish nobility
Preceded by Manuel Pérez de Guzmán	Duke of Medina Sidonia; 1721–1739	Succeeded by Pedro de Alcántara Alonso Pérez de Guzmán
