= José María Téllez-Girón, 7th Duke of Osuna =

Spanish aristocrat (1685–1733)

José María Téllez-Girón y Benavides, 7th Duke of Osuna, 7th Marquess of Peñafiel, 11th Count of Ureña and Grandee of Spain (25 May 1685 – 18 May 1733), was a Spanish nobleman, military commander and diplomat.

== Biography ==
Born in Madrid, he was the second surviving son of Gaspar Téllez-Girón, 5th Duke de Osuna, and his second wife, Ana Antonia de Benavides Carrillo y Toledo, Marquise of Caracena and Countess of Pinto. When his elder brother died without sons in 1716, he became 7th Duke of Osuna, after a dispute with his niece María Domínguez Téllez Girón y Velasco, Marquise de Berlanga.

In 1704 he attended the Siege of Gibraltar with his brother. In the plans for the 1707 Battle of Almansa, he is already mentioned as mariscal de campo (field marshal). By order of his general, he brought to Madrid 100 banners taken from the enemy, which Philip V of Spain ordered it to be placed in the Basilica of Atocha. He was also the author of the account of the Battle of Almansa. On 10 November 1707, he participated in the Battle of Lérida, in which he was wounded.

On 5 June 1719, he was appointed Lieutenant General and on 30 September 1721 he was sent to Versailles as extraordinary ambassador to ask for the hand of Princess Louise Élisabeth d'Orléans for Infante Luis. As a result of his efforts, the French King Louis XV honored him by conferring the necklace of the Order of the Holy Spirit on 22 January 1722.

At the end of 1722 he was appointed head of the delegation to accompany the French princess Philippine Élisabeth d'Orléans, who was going to marry Infante Carlos. On 25 January 1723, he delivered to the French Monarch the jewel that the King of Spain had sent him, and the next day he departed with the Princess, whom he accompanied to Buitrago and presented in Fuencarral on 16 February.

He was also captain of the 1st company of the Life Guards in the service of Philip V, Gentilhombre de cámara con ejercicio and figured among the Illustrious Sons of Madrid presented by José Antonio Álvarez Baena.

=== Marriage and children ===
He married Francisca Bibiana, 6th daughter of Manuel Pérez de Guzmán, 12th Duke of Medina Sidonia on 21 September 1721.

They had 2 children:

- María Faustina Manuel Téllez-Girón (1724-1797), who married Francisco Alfonso Pimentel y Borja.
- Pedro Téllez-Girón, 8th Duke of Osuna (1728-1787), his successor.

== Sources ==
- Real Academia de la Historia.
- Fernández de Béthencourt, Francisco (1900). Historia genealógica y heráldica de la monarquía española: casa real y grandes de España. Vol. 2. Madrid: Establecimiento Tipográfico de Enrique Teodoro.

Spanish nobility
Preceded by Francisco Téllez-Girón	Duke of Osuna; 1716–1733	Succeeded by Pedro Téllez-Girón
