= Manuel Pérez de Guzmán, 12th Duke of Medina Sidonia =

Duke of Medina Sidonia

The Most Excellent Manuel Pérez de Guzmán 12th Duke of Medina Sidonia GE
- Born: Manuel Pérez de Guzmán y Pimentel; 27 October 1671; Huelva, Spain
- Died: 2 April 1721 (aged 49); Madrid, Spain
- Title: Duke of Medina Sidonia
- Predecessor: 11th Duke of Medina Sidonia
- Successor: 13th Duke of Medina Sidonia

Manuel Pérez de Guzmán y Pimentel, 12th Duke of Medina Sidonia (1671–1721) became Duke of Medina Sidonia in 1713.

== Biography ==
He was the only son of Juan Claros Pérez de Guzmán, 11th Duke of Medina Sidonia and Antonia Teresa Pimentel.

He was married in 1687, aged 16, to the 17-year-old Luisa Maria de Silva Mendoza. She was a daughter of Gregorio Maria Domingo, the 5th Duke of Pastrana, 5th Duke of Estremera and 9th Duke of el Infantado. They had 10 children, including :

- Domingo (1691-1739), XIII Duke of Medina Sidonia.
- Francisca Bibiana, married in 1721 José María Téllez-Girón, 7th Duke of Osuna.
- Juana, married in 1713, Fadrique Vicente de Toledo Osorio, 9th Marquis of Villafranca del Bierzo.
- Rosa, married the 6th Marquis of Ariza and Admiral of Aragón.

Spanish nobility
| Preceded by Juan Claros Pérez de Guzmán | Duke of Medina Sidonia; 1713–1721 | Succeeded by Domingo José Claros Pérez de Guzmán |
