= Juan Claros Pérez de Guzmán, 11th Duke of Medina Sidonia =

Spanish noble (1642–1713)

Juan Claros Pérez de Guzmán y Fernández de Córdoba, 11th Duke of Medina Sidonia (1642–1713) was a Spanish noble who became Duke of Medina Sidonia in 1667 upon the death of his half-brother Gaspar Juan Pérez de Guzmán, 10th Duke of Medina Sidonia.

== Biography ==
He was the son of Gaspar Alfonso Pérez de Guzmán, 9th Duke of Medina Sidonia and his second wife Juana Fernández de Córdoba y Enríquez de Ribera. In 1668 he married Antonia Teresa Pimentel (1646–1677), daughter of the 8th Duke of Benavente. They had one son:

- Manuel Pérez de Guzmán (1671–1721)

The Duke married for a second time in 1678 to Mariana Sinforosa de Guzmán y Guevara, 4th Duchess of Medina de las Torres, whose father, Ramiro Núñez de Guzmán, had been Viceroy of Naples. They had no children.

During the reign of Charles II, he was viceroy of Catalonia between 1690 and 1693, which he had to defend against French troops and Catalan rebels during the Nine Years' War. Later he was State councilor since 1699, and Charles's last Mayordomo mayor. When Felipe V came to the throne in 1701, he was replaced by the Marquis of Villafranca and was made Caballerizo mayor, a post he would hold until his death.

== Sources ==
- Real Academia de la Historia
- Augusto de Burgos: Blasón de España: libro de oro de su nobleza, volume IV, page 105.

Spanish nobility
Preceded by Gaspar Juan Pérez de Guzmán	Duke of Medina Sidonia; 1667–1713	Succeeded by Manuel Pérez de Guzmán
