= The Big Rock Candy Mountains =

1928 song by Harry McClintock

Single by Mac (Harry McClintock)
- A-side: "The Bum Song—No. 2"
- Released: November 16, 1928
- Recorded: September 6, 1928
- Label: Victor Talking Machine Company
- Songwriter: Harry McClintock

"The Big Rock Candy Mountains", first recorded and copyrighted by Harry McClintock in 1928, is a country folk song about a hobo's idea of paradise, a modern version of the medieval concept of Cockaigne. It is a place where "hens lay soft-boiled eggs" and there are "cigarette trees". McClintock said that he wrote the song in 1895, based on tales from his youth hoboing through the United States while working for the railroad as a brakeman. It is catalogued as Roud Folk Song Index No. 6696.

== History ==
The song was first recorded by McClintock, also known by his "hobo" name of Haywire Mac. McClintock said that he wrote the song, though it was likely partially based on other ballads, including "An Invitation to Lubberland" and "The Appleknocker's Lament". Other popular itinerant songs of the day such as "Hobo's Paradise", "Hobo Heaven", "Sweet Potato Mountains", and "Little Streams of Whiskey" likely served as inspiration, as they mention concepts similar to those in "Big Rock Candy Mountain". "The Big Rock Candy Mountains", along with its A-side "The Bum Song—No. 2", was first recorded on September 6, 1928, in Hollywood, California. Victor Talking Machine Company released the single on November 16, 1928, with the artist name "Mac (Harry McClintock)".

Before recording the song, McClintock cleaned it up considerably from the version he sang as a street busker in the 1890s. Originally the song described a child being recruited into hobo life by tales of the "big rock candy mountain". In later years, when McClintock appeared in court as part of a copyright dispute, he cited the original words of the song, the last stanza of which was:

The punk rolled up his big blue eyes
And said to the jocker, "Sandy,
I've hiked and hiked and wandered too,
But I ain't seen any candy.
I've hiked and hiked till my feet are sore
And I'll be damned if I hike any more
To be * * * * * * * *
In the Big Rock Candy Mountains.

The lyrics of the missing line have not been made public; in the released version the entire verse was omitted.

The song was not popularized until 1939, when it peaked at #1 on Billboard magazine's country music charts. But it achieved more widespread popularity in 1949 when a sanitized version intended for children was re-recorded by Burl Ives. It has been recorded by many artists throughout the world, but a version recorded in 1960 by Dorsey Burnette to date was the biggest success for the song in the post-1954 "rock era", having reached No. 102 on Billboard's chart.

The most famous version has this refrain:

Oh, the buzzin' of the bees in the cigarette trees
The soda water fountain
Where the lemonade springs and the bluebird sings
In that Big Rock Candy Mountain.

Sanitized versions have been popular, especially with children's musicians; in these, the "cigarette trees" become peppermint trees, and the "streams of alcohol" trickling down the rocks become streams of lemonade. The lake of whiskey becomes a lake of soda pop.

== Editions ==
Folklorist John Greenway published the song in his American Folksongs of Protest (1953), redacting only the second to last line. Bowdlerized versions are included in Irwin Silber's Songs of the Great American West (1967) and Alan Lomax's The Penguin Book of American Folk Songs (1964).

A folk version of the song is included in the Gordon "Inferno" Collection in the Library of Congress, under the title "The Appleknocker's Lament".

== Recordings ==
- Immediately after the Harry McClintock record, in November 1928, Ernie Hare recorded the song as Hobo Jack Turner.
- Vernon Dalhart and Company recorded this as The Big Rock Candy Mountains, on Edison Diamond Disc No. 52472-L, in February 1929. This version is now available on cylinder record, released in November 2016 by the Vulcan Cylinder Record Company.
- A version of the song was recorded by Pete Seeger for Folkways Records in 1957 (Track 2, Side 2 in the American Favorite Ballads, Vol. 1 LP).
- Bing Crosby included the song in a medley on his album 101 Gang Songs (1961)
- The New Christy Minstrels did a version of the song, which was included in a special compilation by Columbia Records of children's songs.
- Roger Whittaker performed a version of this tune on his 1975 children's album The Magical World of Roger Whittaker
- The Beat Farmers recorded a version on their 1985 studio album Tales of the New West
- The song was used in the 1987 film Ironweed and sung by Tom Waits.
- Musician Tom Chapin included a children's version of the song on his 1988 album Family Tree.
- Larry Groce sang the song on Disney Children's Favorite Songs 4 in 1990.
- Red Grammer sang it on Favorite Sing-Along Songs.
- Lisa Loeb sang a kid's version of the song on her 2004 children's album Catch the Moon.
- In his 2004 album The Nifty Mervous Thrifty, Muck Sticky covered this song.
- A version of the song was recorded by The Restarts, a punk band from London, England.
- In 2014, The Okee Dokee Brothers recorded a more family-friendly version of the song for their album Through the Woods, replacing references to alcohol and whiskey with chocolate and marmalade, for example.

=== Other renditions ===
- The song was used in a 1981 showtape at Chuck E. Cheese's Pizza Time Theatre restaurants.
- The song was used in a 2005 Burger King commercial, although the lyrics were changed to reference the Burger King TenderCrisp Bacon Cheddar Ranch sandwich. In the commercial almost all of the promises of the song are shown in detail. Darius Rucker appears as the cowboy singing the song. Brooke Burke also appears as a cowgirl.
- Comedian Sarah Silverman sang a version on The Sarah Silverman Program in the episode "There's No Place Like Homeless".
- The song was sung by Harry Dean Stanton in his role as Roman Grant in the HBO series Big Love.
- Singer-songwriter Bruce Hornsby has occasionally used the song as an intro to his song "Candy Mountain Run" in live performances.
- Natalie Maines of The Chicks sang a version of the song on the 2016 episode "Gal of Constant Sorrow" of the television show The Simpsons, with references to characters on the show.

== References to the song ==
=== Physical locations ===
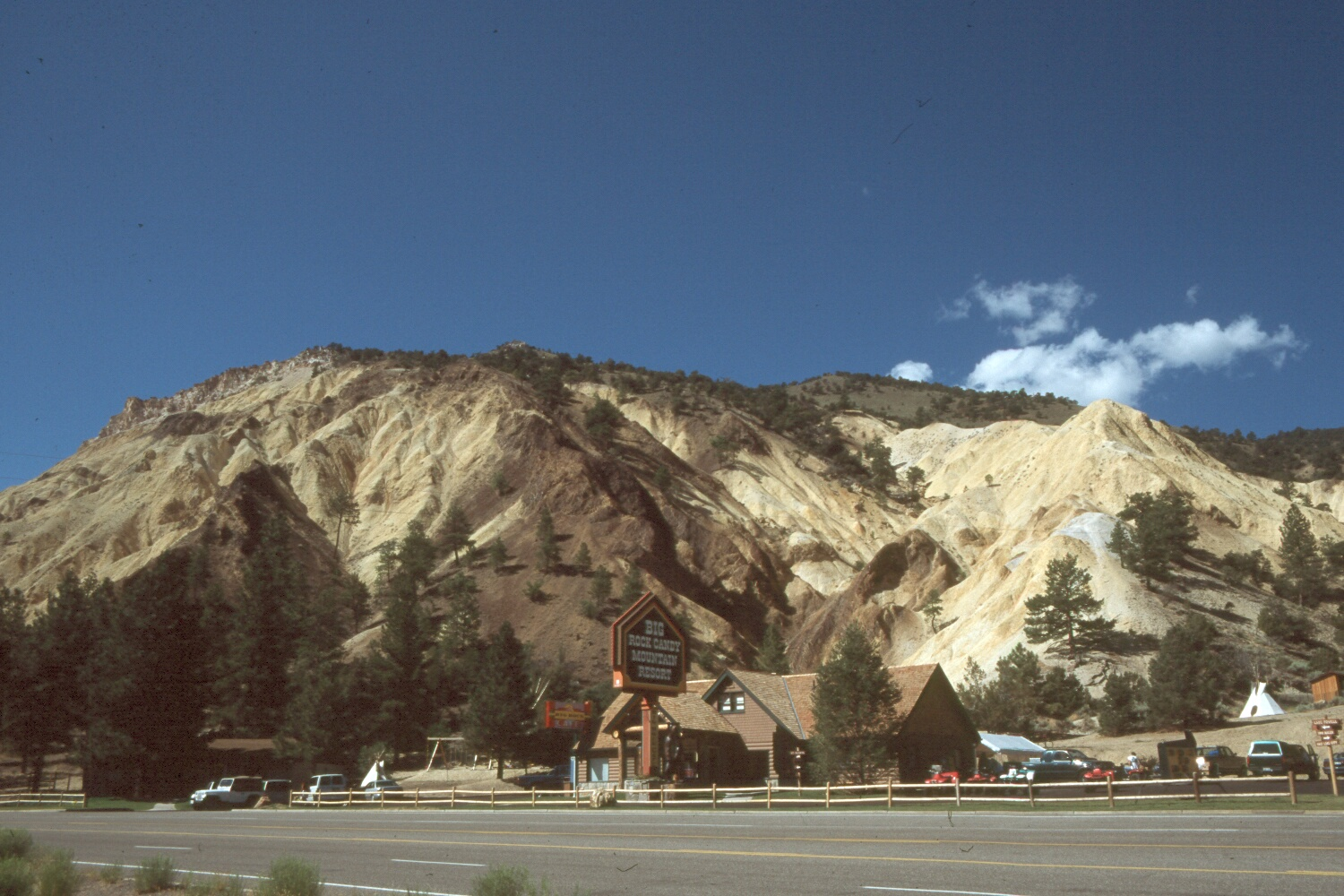
Big Rock Candy Mountain in Utah

A cluster of brightly colored hills just north of Marysvale, Utah, near the Fishlake National Forest, is named the "Big Rock Candy Mountain". In 1928, after the song had been released, some Utah residents jokingly placed a sign at the base of the hills labeling it the "Big Rock Candy Mountain", along with a sign next to a nearby spring proclaiming it "Lemonade Springs". The Big Rock Candy Mountain Resort currently sits at the base of the hills offering lodging and an assortment of high adventure activities through Big Rock Adventure. The resort is also a major hub on the Paiute ATV trail.

Other rock formations in the United States have also borrowed the name of the song; the largest exposed rock in the South Platte rock climbing area of Colorado is also called "Big Rock Candy Mountain" because of its colored stripes resembling a candy cane. Additionally, one of the peaks in the Capitol State Forest in Washington State is named "Big Rock Candy Mountain".

=== Publications ===
==== In literature ====
- In 1943, Wallace Stegner published an autobiographical novel titled The Big Rock Candy Mountain. He published a further autobiographical work in 1992 entitled Where the Bluebird Sings to the Lemonade Springs, a reference to a line in the song.
- In 1945, George Orwell referenced the song in the book Animal Farm with an animal version of heaven named Sugarcandy Mountain.
- In Glen Cook's 1982 novel Shadowline, first in the Starfishers trilogy, a planet named the Big Rock Candy Mountain is the location for several scenes.
- The song is discussed in depth in the book The Areas of My Expertise by John Hodgman, and performed by Jonathan Coulton in the audiobook.
- In 2005, Lucius Shepard referenced the song in the story 'Over Yonder'.
- In Mur Lafferty's Heaven novella series, the Big Rock Candy Mountain is portrayed as the hobo afterlife.
- In the 2014 Valiant Comics series The Delinquents, the Big Rock Candy Mountain is presented as a mesa, atop which is the "lost treasure of the hobos", a giant horn of plenty.
- In Kyle Starks's 2017 comic book miniseries Rock Candy Mountain, the protagonist believes that the mountain is real and goes on a quest to find it.
- In Elizabeth Bear's 2020 Novel Machine, second in the White Space series, an ancient generation ship is named Big Rock Candy Mountain.

==== In film and television ====
- The 1963 Famous Studios Screen Song, Hobo's Holiday, features the adult lyrics which appear on screen with a bouncing ball.
- The 1977 Rankin/Bass special The Easter Bunny Is Comin' to Town includes the famous refrain (with "peppermint trees"), but not the rest of the song.
- In 1987, photographer Robert Frank directed a screenplay by Rudy Wurlitzer entitled Candy Mountain that references the song.
- The 2000 Coen Brothers film O Brother, Where Art Thou? uses this song in the opening credits.
- A performance of the song by John Hartford appears on the Down from the Mountain concert film and soundtrack in 2000.
- The theme song to the 2008-2010 TV series The Marvelous Misadventures of Flapjack is a version of the song with modified lyrics, referring to "a place called Candied Island" instead of "Big Rock Candy Mountain". The series itself echoes the song, as it features two hobo-like characters searching for the fabled paradise of Candied Island.
- In the 2005 movie Brokeback Mountain, when Lureen is speaking to Ennis on the phone after Jack's death, she says that she was never sure if Brokeback Mountain was a real location: "knowing Jack, it was probably some pretend place, where bluebirds sing and there's a whiskey spring..."--the bluebirds and whiskey parts of this line being paraphrases from "Big Rock Candy Mountain."
- During the first dream sequence in the 2011 horror film Twixt, the lyrics of the song are sung with an alternate melody.
- In the 2003 film Runaway Jury, an adaptation of a John Grisham legal thriller, Jacob Wood has to learn the words of the song for his son's birthday. This does not occur in the novel.
- In the 2012-2014 Cartoon Network show, adapted from a YouTube series, "The High Fructose Adventures of Annoying Orange" there is a character named Big Rock Candy Monster, from the planet of Marshmalia (a land that is an allusion to this song). Big Rock Candy Monster also appears in the Annoying Orange parody of "Gangnam Style", "ORANGE NYA NYA STYLE (GANGNAM STYLE PARODY)".
- In the 2015 film Room, Ma (Brie Larson) sings a version of the song to her son Jack (Jacob Tremblay).
- In the SyFy channel series Van Helsing, Sam sings bits of the song in the episode "Little Thing" and the Burl Ives rendition is played over the closing credits of several episodes.
- The Ives version of the song is played in the season 4 episode "Something Stupid" of AMC's crime drama Better Call Saul.
- Throughout the 2019 DuckTales episode GlomTales, Scrooge McDuck and his family are traveling to Rock Candy Mountain to find the Hobo King's treasure.
- The song appears in the background of a 2021 TV advertisement for the Chevrolet Silverado truck.
- The song is played in the 2024 film, Never Let Go. The children in the film dance in the living room with their mother looking on while the song is playing. When the oldest son, Sam, is burning the house down, the song is playing again.

==== In music ====
- The song "Candy Mountain Cave", from the online video Charlie the Unicorn, parodies this song (to the tune of the "Clarinet Polka").
- In 1978, country singer Mel Tillis released the single "Ain't No California", which includes the line, "Ain't no Big Rock Candy Mountain."
- In the year 1997, the Northern Irish group Barnbrack covered the song, making slight changes to the lyrics.
- In the year 2026, Moussalangelo (Moses Thomas Kent) released a song set to the tune of Big rock candy mountain called “The GeekBar Candy Mountain.” He changed the lyrics to have a more modern context including references to BuzzBallz, GeekBars and Galaxy Gas

==== In video games ====
- The Independent fighting game Royalty Free-For-All uses the song as stage music in the Ol' McDonald's Farm stage, keeping to its theme of using public domain properties.
