= Iron Bridge of El Capricho Park =

Coordinates: 40°27′26″N 3°35′59″W

The Iron Bridge of El Capricho Park is a 19th-century footbridge in El Capricho Park, Madrid. The bridge with its simple arch structure makes an aesthetic contribution to the historic park. It is notable for being the first iron bridge in Spain.

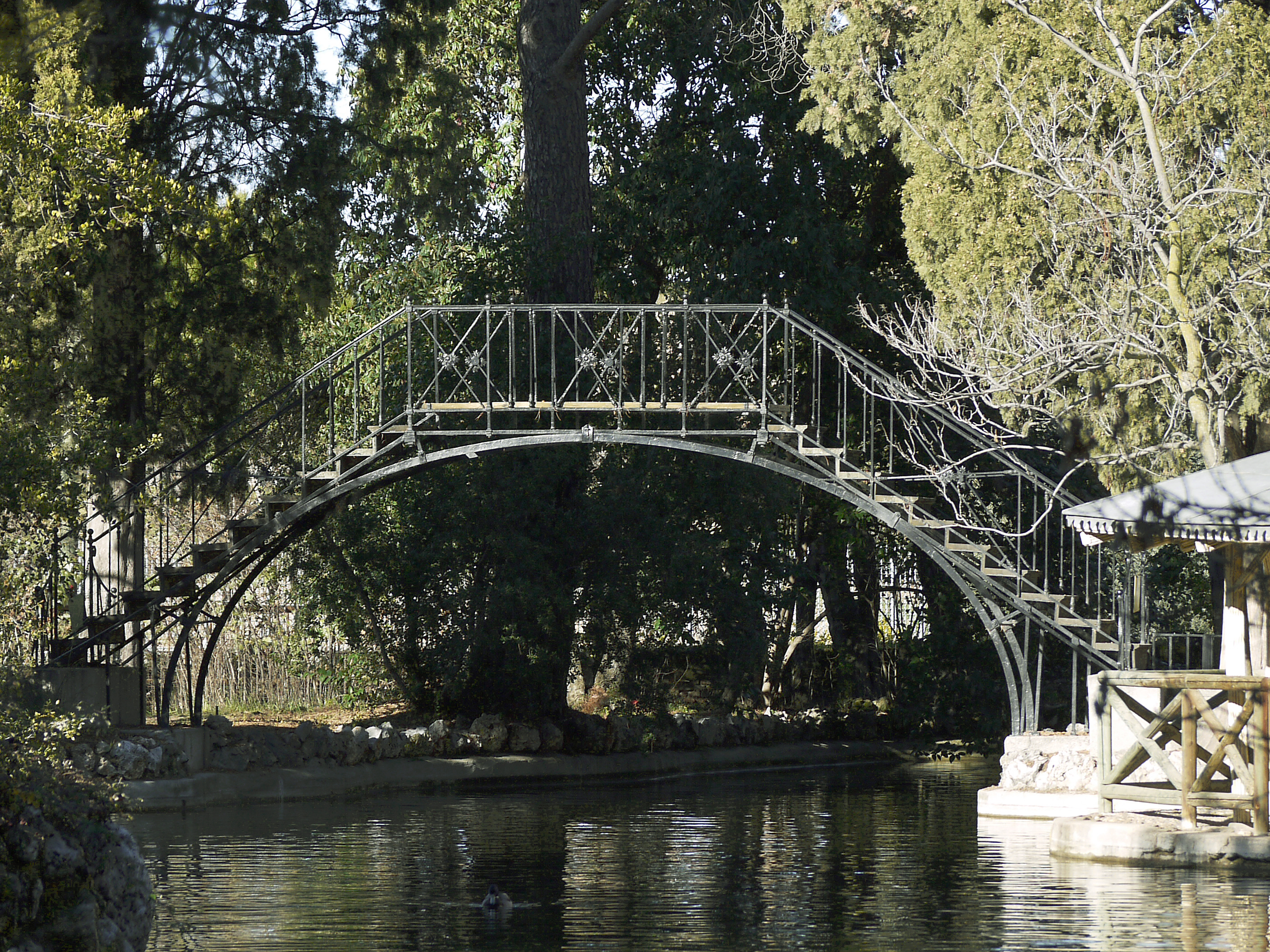
The bridge spans a water feature

It was built in 1830, towards the end of the life of María Josefa Pimentel, Duchess of Osuna. After her marriage in 1771 she spent decades developing the gardens at her family estate in Alameda, then outside Madrid.

In the course of the 19th century, iron became a normal material for bridge construction in Spain. The Puente de Isabel II in Seville, a road bridge completed in 1852, is a much more substantial iron arch bridge. Iron was also used for some Spanish railway bridges, although in the 20th century iron components were replaced with steel, due to the increasing weight of new locomotives.
