= The Drunk Mason (Goya) =

Painting by Francisco de Goya

- El albañil borracho (Spanish)
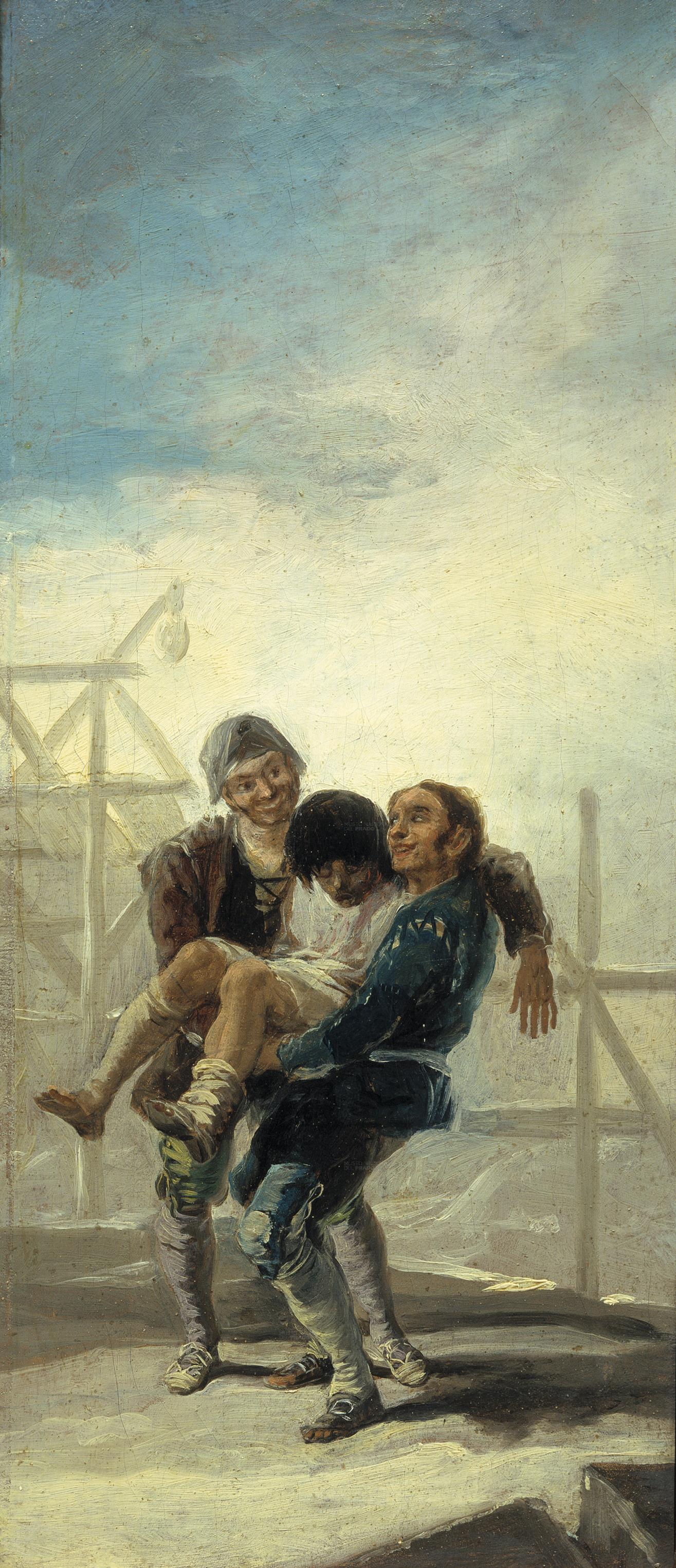
- Artist: Francisco de Goya
- Year: 1786–1787
- Medium: Oil on canvas
- Movement: Pre-Romanticism
- Dimensions: 15 cm × 35 cm (5.9 in × 14 in)
- Location: Museo del Prado, Madrid

The Drunk Mason (Spanish: El albañil borracho) is an oil on canvas painted by Francisco de Goya, then reputed painter of tapestries for the royal palaces. It belonged to the fifth series undertaken by Goya, and, like all the pieces that compose it, was painted between 1786 and 1787.

Goya sold his preparatory sketches for the tapestry cartoons for the bedroom of the Infantas to the Dukes of Osuna. In the sale of their assets in 1896, three of them were acquired by Pedro Fernández Durán and Bernaldo de Quirós, who bequeathed them, along with the rest of his artistic collection, to the Museo del Prado, where they entered after his death in 1930.

From 1942 it kept the catalog number P027820. That same year it appeared in the list of works in the museum (published with some delay), made by Francisco Javier Sánchez Cantón, then deputy director of the museum. It is exhibited in room 94 of the gallery, located on the second floor of the building designed by Juan de Villanueva.

According to the description of the museum's online gallery, it is a preparatory sketch for the tapestry cartoon El albañil herido, although Valeriano Bozal believes that it has not been elucidated whether this cartoon is a sketch prior to El albañil herido or whether it is an independent work done as a variation on the same theme.

Underlying the painting is the interest that the learned of the time (headed by Jovellanos, a friend of Goya's) showed in labor and health reforms in favor of workers and peasants. This issue, together with the chromatism and technique of the piece, allows us to categorize it within the pre-Romanticism.

It has been studied by experts in Goya's art, such as Pierre Gassier and Juliet Wilson-Bareau, who assigned it catalog number 191.

== History ==
It is not entirely clear for what purpose this piece was undertaken. It is most likely that it was in fact a sketch for The Injured Mason and that Goya was forced to change the motif of his composition because of a clash with the directors of the Royal Tapestry Factory of Santa Barbara.

Together with Woman with two Boys at a Fountain and The Threshing Floor, it belongs to the series of sketches of the fifth set of Goyaesque tapestries, destined for the dining room of Prince Charles of Bourbon in the Palace of El Pardo. The series remained incomplete after the death of Carlos III in 1788, and went on to decorate rooms in El Escorial in no fixed order.

All of Goya's preparatory sketches for his cartoons were sold to the Dukes of Osuna, patrons of the artist. In 1896, his heirs sold the works to the family of the Spanish nobleman Pedro Fernández Durán and Bernaldo de Quiraldós. In this auction, the Prado acquired The Meadow of San Isidro, Blind Man's Bluff and The Hermitage of San Isidro, all of them preparatory canvases for the Aragonese artist's cartoons.

== Analysis of the painting ==
In the work it can be seen that a mason in an evident state of drunkenness is carried on his back by two of his companions, who make fun of his deplorable state, without pants and with one of his tights fallen down. In the distance, a construction site can be seen.

Like The Snowstorm and The Poor at the Fountain, it is the only work from Goya's first period in Madrid that did not conform to the artistic conventions of Rococo, but rather advocated Romanticism. This did not prevent the directors of the Royal Tapestry Factory of Santa Barbara, where the tapestries were woven, from imposing on Goya an elongated format for this work.

It was originally conceived as a mocking and jocular work, as the princes liked. But the presence of drunkenness in the painting would not have been suitable for a royal palace, as Hagen considers, so it was transformed into a canvas that depicts a wounded man but at the same time made reference to the beneficent character that Charles III had demonstrated with his 1784 edict protecting the masons.

The comic interpretation it has often received differs from how The Injured Mason has traditionally been seen, as a work of social content and covert criticism of the terrible state of workers' safety.

This painting initiates the taste for rebellious subject matter that would later abound in Goya, a pioneer in depicting the life of the proletariat. The Drunk Mason has a marked satirical character. Here lies the greatest contrast with The Drunk Mason, a painting that begins the school of social realism by presenting the poor as heroes. The laughing faces, so different from the dark sky and the building behind the scene, indicate Goya's feeling for the poor. The Aragonese will be highly identified with the lower classes of the time.

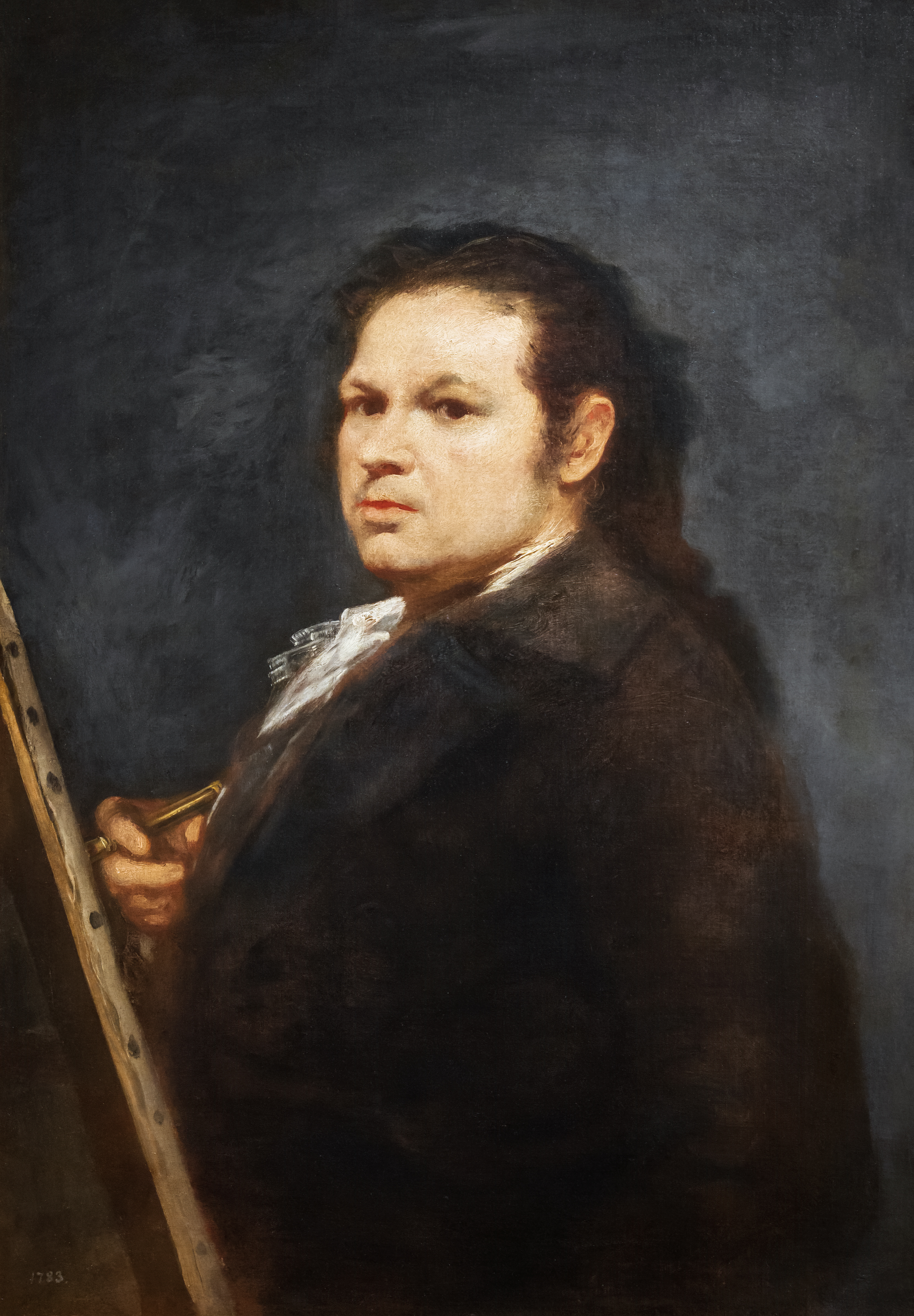
Self-portrait of Goya in 1783, a few years before executing The Drunk Mason.

With brown and gray chromaticism, the painting presents a rapid execution that Goya would enhance in later years. The wintry feel of this painting attempts to demonstrate a possible relationship between The Snowstorm and The Poor at the Fountain. Goya's ability as a portrait painter is evident in his rendering of the mocking faces of the workers, who would later undergo a metamorphosis.

In this work, the artist was concerned with pictorial space, an issue that he resolved due to the succession of planes and the low perspective characteristic of window shutters such as The Drinker. The dark coloring and the impastoed brushwork in the foreground and diluted in the background are reminiscent of The Grape Harvest.

Nigel Glendinning considers that it could be a direct antecedent of the paintings for the alameda of the Dukes of Osuna. Both are but a faithful sign that the Aragonese no longer believed in picturesqueness and longed to separate themselves from the customs imposed in the tapestries.

== See also ==
- List of works by Francisco Goya
- List of Francisco Goya's tapestry cartoons

== Bibliography ==
- Bozal, Valeriano (2005). Francisco Goya, vida y obra (in Spanish). Two volumes (Aficiones, 5-6). Madrid: Tf. ISBN 978-84-96209-39-8.
- Glendinning, Nigel (2005). Francisco de Goya (in Spanish). «Grandes maestros» collection (Biblioteca «Descubrir el Arte» ed.). Madrid: Arlanza. ISBN 84-95503-40-9.
- Hagen, Rose-Marie; Hagen, Rainer (2003). Francisco de Goya (in Spanish). Colonia: Taschen. ISBN 978-84-7090-399-1.
- Mena Marqués, Manuela (2009). "La "mítica" colección de Fernández Durán". El coloso y su atribución a Goya. Madrid: Museo del Prado.
- Pérez Sánchez, Alfonso (1974). Museo del Prado (in Spanish). ISBN 84-2523-815-49. Barcelona: Dánae.
- — (1996). Museo del Prado (in Spanish). Barcelona: Océano. ISBN 84-7764-295-8.
- Rapelli, Paola (1997). Goya (in Spanish). «ArtBook» series. Madrid: Electa. ISBN 84-8156-180-0.
- Tomlinson, Janis A. (1993). Francisco de Goya: los cartones para tapices y los comienzos de su carrera en la Corte de Madrid (in Spanish). Madrid: Cátedra. ISBN 84-376-1192-X.
- — (2008). Cartones para tapices (in Spanish). Online encyclopedia. Museo del Prado.
- Triadó Tur, Juan Ramón (2000). Goya (in Spanish). «Genios de la pintura» collection. Barcelona: Susaeta. ISBN 84-305-9689-5.
