= Paintings for the alameda of the Dukes of Osuna =

Series of paintings by Francisco de Goya

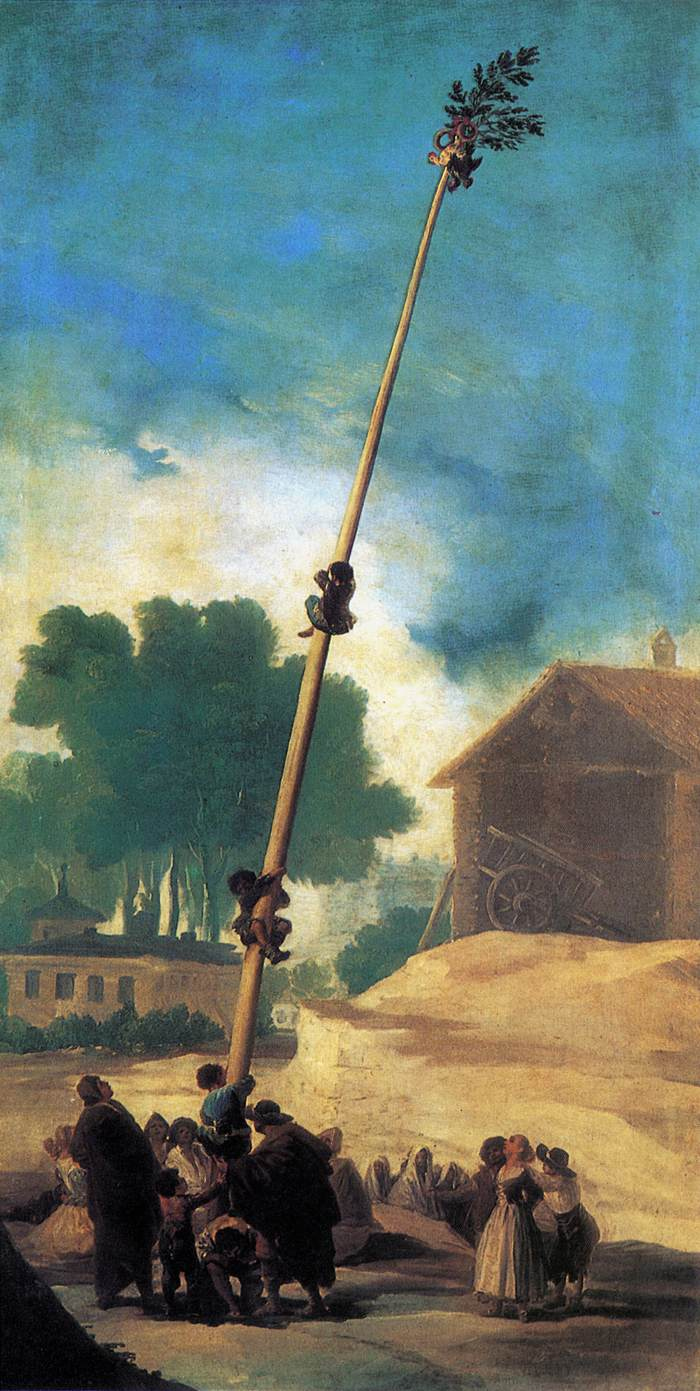
The Greasy Pole (1786-1787)

The series of paintings for the alameda of the Dukes of Osuna comprises seven pictures painted by Francisco de Goya between 1786 and 1787. The country estate of the dukes and duchesses, who were the painter's mecenas and friends, was known as El Capricho, and was located on the outskirts of Madrid.

The whole group of works is closely related to the tapestry cartoons —especially in the colors used and in the lighting panorama—, whose fifth series Goya completed shortly before tackling this project. By then, the Aragonese artist was a reputed artist at court and had already forged a good image for himself in Madrid's wealthy circles.

The works passed into the possession of the Marquesa de Montellano Collection, which also houses other works by Goya, where they remain to this day.

They should not be confused with other pictures painted by the artist, also for the Dukes of Osuna, in the nineties. Although they also adorned the country house of the dukes, critics have coincided in naming this series as "the dream of reason" due to the witchcraft themes it presents.

== History ==
The Countess of Benavente and Duchess of Osuna, María Josefa Pimentel and her husband, Duke Pedro de Alcántara Téllez-Girón y Pacheco, were one of the most cultured and active couples in Madrid's enlightened circles. Goya, who counted among his friends Leandro Fernández de Moratín and Juan Meléndez Valdés, was a member of these circles.

Upon contacting the painter, the dukes were impressed by the ease with which he made the cartoons and, after establishing a close friendship, their now patrons asked him to make a series of paintings to decorate their villa. The Aragonese accepted and began the execution of the works for the Alameda de Osuna after finishing his fifth series of cartoons.

On April 22, 1787, the paintings were transferred from the house of Goya, credited as "Juan Goya" on the invoice, to the Osuna villa. The painter received 22,000 reales for the works and for a lost portrait of the dukes' children. A certain Joaquín Gómez was in charge of paying Goya for his work.

== Analysis ==
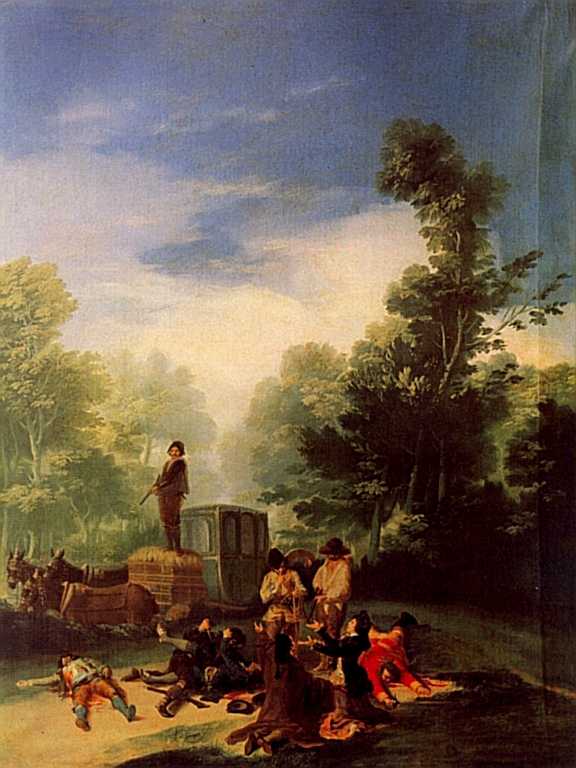
Stagecoach Hijacking.

The dukes commissioned Goya to paint canvases with themes similar to those that the Aragonese artist had treated in the cartoons he delivered to the Royal Tapestry Factory of Santa Barbara. In spite of this, this series has serious aesthetic differences with the cartoons. The figures are smaller, accentuating the theatrical and rococo character of the landscape. Goya can prove here his knowledge of the Sublime Terrible, a trend defined years before by Mengs.

But above all there is violence in these paintings, which differs drastically from the inoffensive atmosphere of the cartoons. The greatest example of this is The Fall, where a woman suffers injuries after falling from a tree. In Stagecoach Hijacking, a man is seen wounded by a gunshot while a group of robbers assaults the car's passengers.

In the painting The Moving of a Stone, the workday of a group of humble workers is detailed. Concern for the lower classes is one of the main characteristics of pre-Romanticism, whose ideals Goya had assimilated through contact with enlightened artists such as Jovellanos. The first painting that refers to this facet of the painter is The Drunken Mason.

Throughout the series, rural themes prevail, calm and friendly, similar to those of the cartoons. The chromatic range is harmonious and pleasant, although Goya, according to Glendinning, believes that scenes of country leisure should be left for the residences located on the outskirts of large cities.

The same scenery is presented that Goya depicted in his works for the Royal Factory: the banks of the Manzanares and its surroundings. But the fact that violence breaks out in some scenes of this series places both sets at extreme poles.

La cucaña is solidly linked to Goya's works such as The Kite and some of French neoclassicism. For its part, Stagecoach Hijacking evokes The Fight at the Venta Nueva, as both introduce a note of violence in the midst of a pleasant landscape. It was the second most expensive painting in the series (3000 reales), although it is smaller than The Moving of a Stone and Village Procession (2500 reales).

By depicting workers of low social status in his paintings, Goya emphasizes their vices, perhaps implying that they are the cause of their inferior position in modern society.

This elitism appears again in Village Procession, a painting that shows a popular Spanish custom rooted in the villages, but which had been disdained by the Enlightenment. Charles III banned them in 1777, but the measure had little effect in rural areas. Goya treats here with little respect the mayor and most of the provincial rich, who appear physically deformed.

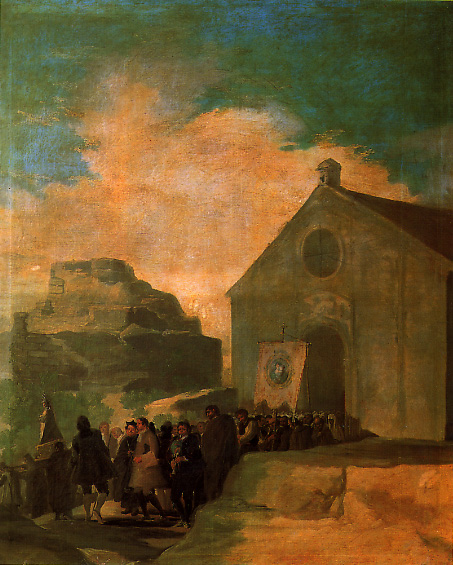
Village Procession.

The English critic recognizes in The Snowstorm and The Injured Mason —as well as his sketch, the aforementioned The Drunk Mason— undertaken at that time, the most direct precedents of these canvases. For the first time the artist introduces in his cartoons —which until then were cheerful and festive compositions— a note alluding to "dangers", which suggests that the painter no longer believes in the current picturesque style and wishes to separate himself from the customs imposed in the cartoons.

The Swing has its parallel in a tapestry cartoon made a decade earlier. But here, as in the whole series, the brushstroke is more vigorous and does not delve into the details, unlike the tapestries.

La cucaña and Village Procession represent scenes of rural Spain, both strongly rooted in 18th century iconography. In Village Procession, the blurred brushstrokes allow for a maximum appreciation of Spanish patron saint festivals, so common in the twilight of the century.

Stagecoach Hijacking is the most complex of Goya's compositions for El Capricho. It mitigates the violent effect of the robbery through the arrangement of the figures, the composition and the chromaticism. The tonalities of the landscape contrast with the gravity of the robbery, which is pushed into the background by Goya's placement of the corpse in the lower left corner. Clearly, it is the assailants who are the main protagonists of the scene. Despite this, two thirds of the canvas are dedicated to portraying the landscape of limpid sky and lush vegetation, with the lower third dedicated to capturing the moment of the robbery.

== See also ==
- List of works by Francisco Goya
- The Drunk Mason
- Francisco Goya's tapestry cartoons

== Bibliography ==
- Bozal, Valeriano (2005). Francisco Goya, vida y obra (in Spanish). Vol. Two volumes. Aficiones, 5-6. madrid: Tf. ISBN 978-84-96209-39-8.
- d'Ors Führer, Carlos; Morales Marín, Carlos (1990). Los genios de la pintura: Francisco de Goya (in Spanish). Madrid: Sarpe. ISBN 8477001006.
- Glendinning, Nigel (2005). Francisco de Goya (in Spanish). «Grandes maestros» collection (Biblioteca «Descubrir el Arte» ed.). Madrid: Arlanza. ISBN 84-95503-40-9.
- Tomlinson, Janis A. (1993). Francisco de Goya: los cartones para tapices y los comienzos de su carrera en la Corte de Madrid (in Spanish). Madrid: Cátedra. ISBN 84-376-1192-X.
- Triadó Tur, Juan Ramón (2000). Goya (in Spanish). «Genios de la pintura» collection. Barcelona: Susaeta. ISBN 84-305-9689-5.
