= Animal Fair =

Animal Fair may refer to:

- "Animal Fair" (song)
- Animal Fair (magazine)
