= El Capricho Park =

El Capricho
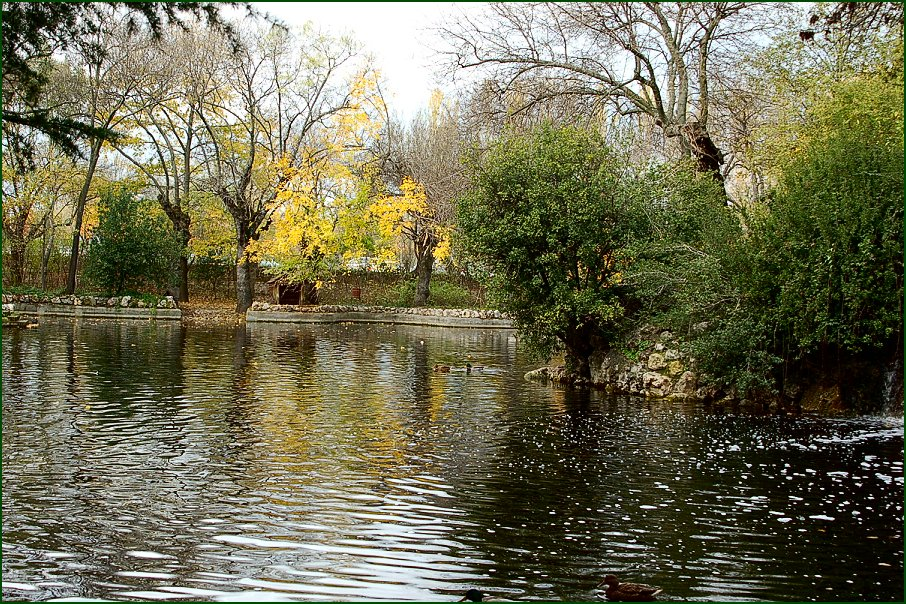
- The lake in the park

- Location within Madrid Location within Spain
- Location: Madrid
- Coordinates: 40.4561°N 3.5987°W
- Area: 14
- Established: 1787
- Public transit: El Capricho

El Capricho is a park in Madrid. The word capricho is Spanish for "whim" or "caprice". It was created by María Josefa Pimentel, Duchess of Osuna (1752-1834) on her estate at Alameda de Osuna, which was then outside the city of Madrid. It is landscaped in eighteenth-century style with formal and naturalistic features. It is recognised as one of the most beautiful parks in the city.

The landscape design shows some English influence. Characteristically of continental gardens in the English style, there are a number of "eye-catchers" such as a hermit's house and a temple to Bacchus. Other features include a lake and a maze.

== Structures ==
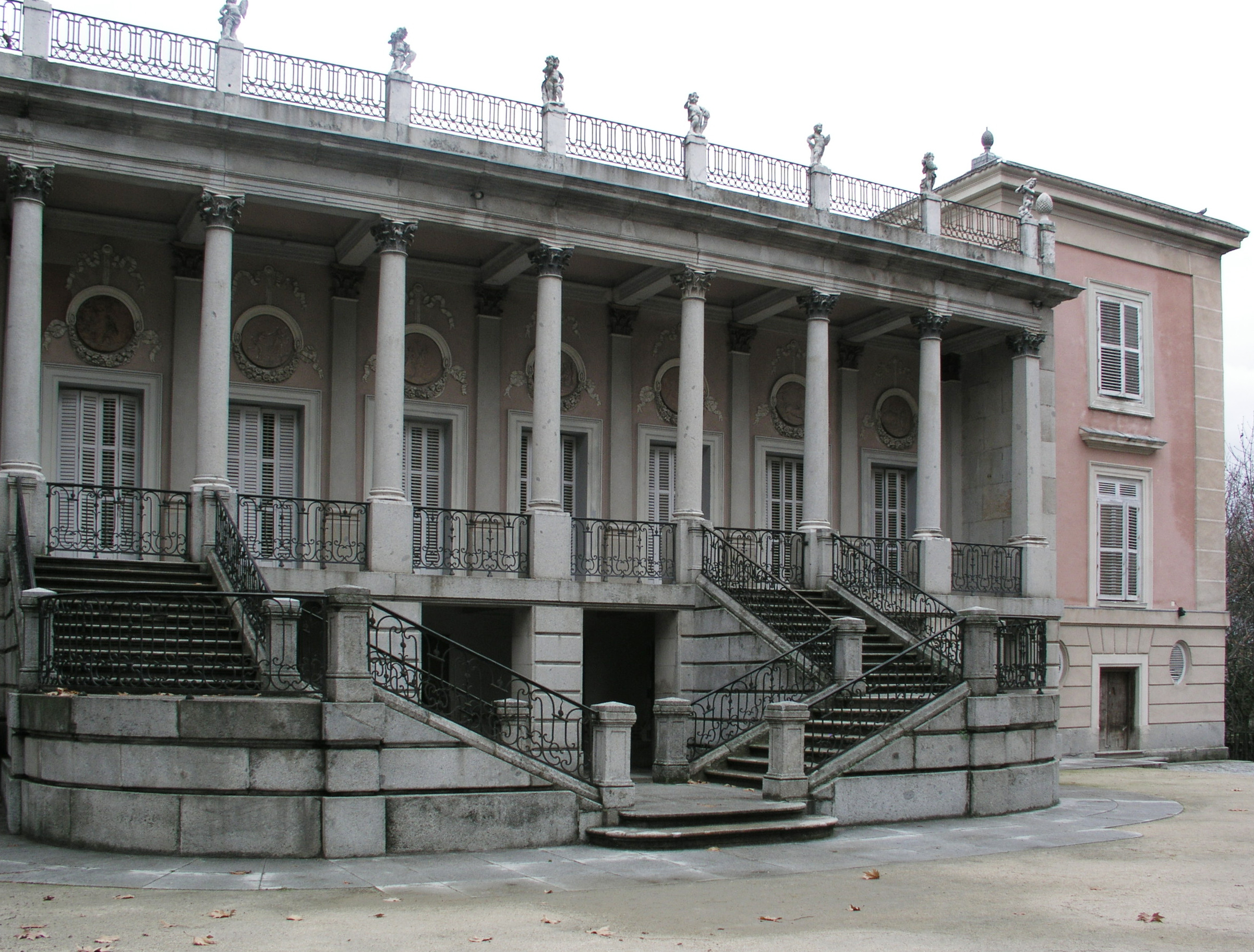
Palace of the Dukes of Osuna

There are various buildings from the time of the Duchess, the largest being the ducal palacio.

The Duchess continued to make improvements to the gardens until the end of her life, one of the last features being an iron bridge, which was constructed in 1830. This footbridge is claimed to be the first iron bridge in Spain.

There is a bunker from the Civil War period. It is known as posición Jaca.

== Conservation ==
The park has been designated a jardín histórico.

== Access ==
The park is within the Madrid suburbs and is accessible by bus and metro (line 5). The park is normally open to the public at weekends.

In 2016 it was proposed to open the palace as a museum.

== See also ==
- Paintings for the alameda of the Dukes of Osuna
