= Mountain Stage =

- Genre: Music
- Running time: 120 min.
- Country of origin: United States
- Home station: West Virginia Public Broadcasting
- Hosted by: Kathy Mattea (2021–); Larry Groce (1983–2021)
- Announcer: Adam Harris
- Created by: Andy Ridenour, Francis Fisher, Larry Groce
- Executive producer: Adam Harris
- Original release: 1983 – present
- Opening theme: "Simple Song", by Larry Groce
- Website: MountainStage.org
- Podcast: MountainStage.org/podcasts

Mountain Stage is a two-hour music radio show, first aired in 1983, produced by West Virginia Public Broadcasting and distributed worldwide by National Public Radio (NPR). Hosted by Larry Groce from the show's inception until 2021 and currently hosted by singer and West Virginia native Kathy Mattea, the program showcases diverse music, from the traditional to modern. It is recorded before a live audience, usually at the Culture Center Theater in Charleston, West Virginia, but occasionally travels to other venues elsewhere in the United States. Major private funding is provided by the West Virginia-based law firm of Bailey & Glasser LLP and the West Virginia Tourism Office.

== History ==
Logo used under Larry Groce's tenure as host until circa 2017

Created by Andy Ridenour, Larry Groce and Francis Fisher, Mountain Stage originally aired in 1983. All three founders continued in their original roles until 2011, when executive producer Ridenour retired after 28 years. Mountain Stage is now produced by Adam Harris, who began working for the show in 2005 as an unpaid intern. Each year between 24 and 26 two-hour episodes are produced. Most are recorded at the Culture Center Theater in Charleston, West Virginia; however, the show has traveled to New York City, Boston, Philadelphia, Pennsylvania; Ann Arbor, Michigan; Ashland, Kentucky; Athens, Georgia; Bristol, Tennessee/Virginia; Winnipeg Folk Festival (Canada), Lexington, Kentucky; Pittsburgh, Pennsylvania; Kerrville Folk Festival (Texas); Harrisonburg, Virginia; and Fairbanks, Alaska.

In 2003 a coffee-table style book, 20 Years of Mountain Stage, was published in honor of the radio show's 20th Anniversary.

Between 2001 and 2003, Mountain Stage taped 39 episodes of a nationally syndicated television series for public television. In 2007, an additional series of nine, one-hour specials, filmed in high-definition, were also recorded for public television. The TV series featured John Pizzarelli, John Mayall, Richard Thompson, Nanci Griffith, the Holmes Brothers, Odetta, Arlo Guthrie & the Guthrie Family Legacy, Martina McBride, Ralph Stanley & the Clinch Mountain Boys, Yonder Mountain String Band in 2014, John Hammond and Jorma Kaukonen.

Mountain Stage began its 28th season in Glasgow, Scotland, as part of the 2011 Celtic Connections festival. Its 750th show was recorded in September 2011 at the North House Folk School in Grand Marais, Minnesota. Episode 800 was recorded in 2013 with Dawes, Ani DiFranco, Dave Mason and Red Baraat. The show recorded episode 900 in July 2017 with Steve Earle & The Dukes, The Mastersons, The Sherman Holmes Project, Steelism and West Virginia storyteller Bil Lepp.

The 35th anniversary of Mountain Stage was celebrated in December 2018 with the Amy Ray Band, Crash Test Dummies, Anais Mitchell, Parker Millsap and William Matheny.

Mountain Stage has welcomed six guest hosts since 2014, beginning with Grammy-winning musician Tim O'Brien, former Assistant Producer Joni Deutsch, who guest-hosted twice, West Virginia singer-songwriter Todd Burge, CBS Sunday Morning correspondent Conor Knighton, and Tony Award winner and West Virginia native Michael Cerveris.

Since March 2018, country music singer and West Virginia native Mattea has been a regular guest host. Mattea first appeared on Mountain Stage in November 1985 and has appeared on the show more times than any other female artist, and she is second to Tim O'Brien for total number of appearances. On September 9, 2021, it was announced that Mattea will be the permanent host of Mountain Stage, succeeding Groce.

== Format ==
The radio show begins with its theme, "Simple Song", written and performed by founding host Larry Groce. Under the influence of Groce's tenure as artistic director, the program showcases diverse music, from the traditional to the brand new, including roots music to indie rock and jazz. Usually, five musical guests will appear on any given show.

Among the luminaries who appeared on Mountain Stage before they were famous or whose first national-exposure in the U.S. on Mountain Stage are Sarah McLachlan, Norah Jones, Crash Test Dummies, Barenaked Ladies, Ben Harper, Paula Cole, Nickel Creek, Cassandra Wilson, Counting Crows, and Phish. In April 1991, R.E.M. appeared on the show, bringing national attention to the program.

Over the years, the show has featured such international luminaries as Tori Amos, Phish, Barenaked Ladies, Toad the Wet Sprocket, Cake, Galactic, Bruce Hornsby, the Derek Trucks Band, Chris Thile, Bell X-1, Judy Collins, They Might Be Giants, Norah Jones, Hubert Sumlin & Pinetop Perkins, Charles Brown, Martina McBride, Little Big Town, Amos Lee, Joan Baez, Patti Smith, Jakob Dylan and Regina Spektor, as well as Mattea, Tim O'Brien and over a hundred West Virginia artists.

== Distribution ==
Mountain Stage is heard on over 270 NPR stations nationwide, as of June 2024. The full-length show is available on demand as a podcast. Select guest artist segments, including songs not heard on the radio, are posted at the NPR Music website. Video performances of select shows can be found on the West Virginia channel at LiveSessions.NPR.org.

30 albums compiling live performances from the Mountain Stage series have also been released on Blue Plate Music, a division of Oh Boy Records, and are still available through Amazon.com.

In 2024 the vinyl club, Heady Wax Fiends, pressed a limited release blue/green swirl colored vinyl of the compilation album Live From Mountain Stage - Outliers & Outlaws, featuring live performances from artists such as Wilco, Molly Tuttle, Tyler Childers, Margo Price, Gillian Welch & David Rawlings, John Prine, Steve Earle, Bela Fleck & Abigail Washington, Sierra Ferrell, Jason Isbell and the 400 Unit.

In 2008, NPR signed an exclusive on-line distribution deal with Mountain Stage.
