= Disney Children's Favorite Songs 3 =

Disney's Children's Favorites, Volume 3
- Artwork for 1996 re-release

Compilation album by Larry Groce and the Disneyland Children's Sing-Along Chorus
- Released: 1986 (original release); 1990 (re-release); 1991 (re-release); 1992 (Special Edition); 1993 (re-release); 1996 (re-release)
- Recorded: 1985–1986
- Genre: Children
- Length: 41:50 (1986, 1990, 1991, 1993 and 1996 releases)
- Labels: Disneyland (1986 release); Walt Disney (1990, 1991, 1992 Special Edition, 1993 and 1996 releases)
- Producers: Pat Patrick; Ron Kidd

Larry Groce and the Disneyland Children's Sing-Along Chorus chronology
| Disney Children's Favorite Songs 2 (1979) | Disney's Children's Favorites, Volume 3 (1986) | Disney Children's Favorite Songs 4 (1990) |

Professional ratings
Review scores
| Source | Rating |
|---|---|
| AllMusic | 3/5 stars |

Disney's Children's Favorites, Volume 3 is the third entry of the Disney's Children's Favorites series. The album contains 23 classic children's songs.

== Track listing ==
1. "If You're Happy and You Know It" – 1:09
2. "Shoo Fly, Don't Bother Me" – 1:00
3. "Oh, Dear! What Can the Matter Be?" – 1:59
4. Activity Medley: "The Itsy Bitsy Spider" / "Ring Around the Rosie" / "One, Two, Buckle My Shoe" – 1:35
5. "Hush, Little Baby" – 1:39
6. "Did You Ever See a Lassie?" – 1:24
7. "Grandfather's Clock" – 3:22
8. "Clementine" – 1:49
9. "Michael, Row the Boat Ashore" – 2:29
10. "Alouette" – 2:02
11. "With Apologies to Mother Goose" (Will Ryan) – 2:15
12. "Sweet Betsy from Pike" – 1:21
13. "Over the River and Through the Woods" – 1:15
14. "Billy Boy" – 1:38
15. Nursery Rhyme Medley: "Baa, Baa, Black Sheep" / "Sing a Song of Sixpence" / "Old King Cole" – 1:57
16. "Alphabet Song" – 1:26
17. "Why Do They Make Things Like They Do?" (Michael and Patty Silversher and Larry Groce) – 2:04
18. "Loch Lomond" – 2:04
19. "A-Hunting We Will Go" – 0:54
20. "Down in the Valley" – 2:05
21. "Waltzing Matilda" (Banjo Paterson) – 2:25
22. "Just for You" (Michael and Patty Silversher and Larry Groce) – 2:18
23. "Goodnight, Ladies" – 1:05
