= Animal Fair (song) =

Traditional folk song and round

Animal Fair (Roud 4582) is a traditional folk song and children's song. It was sung by minstrels and sailors as early as 1898. The song was referred to in Life magazine in 1941 as a cadence of soft shoe tap dancing.

== Lyrics ==
The 1897 version has the following lyrics:

I went to the animal fair,
The birds and the beasts were there;
The little baboon by the light of the moon
Was combing his auburn hair.
The monkey he got drunk,
And sat on the elephant's trunk,
The elephant sneezed and fell on his knees
And that was the end of the monk.

Other versions substituted "the old raccoon" (1914) for "the little baboon", while modern recordings use "the big baboon". "The monkey he got drunk" is sometimes changed to "The monkey fell out of his bunk", "The monkey bumped the skunk", "You ought to have seen the monk" or "You should have seen the monk", "the monkey jumped and jumped". The Barney & Friends and the Captain Kangaroo versions changed other lyrics as well. Some versions reverse the sentence about the baboon thus: by the light of the moon, the great baboon, etc. which makes no difference to the meaning and retains the rhyming couplet. Another alternative lyric concerning the monkey falling out of 'the bunk' is that the monkey 'slid down' the elephant's trunk.

The song may be sung as a round with the last word "monkey, monkey" repeated until the song finishes or the group repeats.

== Recordings ==
- Sung by Woody Woodpecker in The Dizzy Acrobat (1943)
- Recorded and sung by Tex Ritter as part of Children's Songs and Stories (1948)
- Captain Kangaroo with Mitch Miller's orchestra & The Sandpipers (1958)
- Sung by Richard Dreyfuss's character Moses Wine to his sons in the film The Big Fix (1978)
- Sung by Larry Groce on Disney Children's Favorite Songs 1 in 1979
- Sung on Sharon, Lois & Bram's Elephant Show by Sharon, Lois & Bram (Season 4, "Pet Fair Episode", 1987)
- Sung in Kidsongs: A Day at Camp (1989)
- Sung by Laurie Berkner in 1997
- Used as Elmyra's theme in Tiny Toon Adventures
- Sung in Barney & Friends episodes "The Dentist Makes Me Smile" (1993) and "Barney's Super Singing Circus" (2000)
- Used in Animaniacs several times
- Used in the Storybook Rhymes toys made by Fisher-Price. First performed by Kate Higgins as the narrator in the original 2006 release, then as Puppy in the 2013—onwards releases
