= Disney Children's Favorite Songs 1 =

Disney's Children's Favorites, Volume 1
- Artwork for 1996 re-release

Compilation album by Larry Groce and the Disneyland Children's Sing-Along Chorus
- Released: July 1979 (original release); 1986 (re-release); 1990 (re-release); 1991 (re-release); 1992 (Special Edition); 1993 (re-release); 1996 (re-release); 2008 (Special Edition)
- Recorded: 1976, 1978–1979
- Genre: Children's music
- Length: 37:00 (1979, 1986, 1990, 1991, 1993 and 1996 releases)
- Label: Disneyland (1979 and 1986 releases); Walt Disney (1990, 1991, 1992 Special Edition, 1993, 1996 and 2008 Special Edition releases)
- Producer: Jymn Magon

Larry Groce and the Disneyland Children's Sing-Along Chorus chronology
Disney's Children's Favorites, Volume 1 (1979)	Disney Children's Favorite Songs 2 (1979)

Professional ratings
Review scores
Source	Rating
AllMusic	3/5 stars

Disney's Children's Favorites, Volume 1 is the first entry of the Disney's Children's Favorites series. The album contains 25 classic children's songs.

== Track listing ==
1. "This Old Man (Knick-Knack Paddy Whack)"
2. "I've Been Working on the Railroad"
3. "Three Blind Mice"
4. "Oh, Susanna" (Stephen Foster)
5. "The Man on the Flying Trapeze"
6. "Jimmy Crack Corn"
7. "The Mail Must Go Through" (Larry Groce)
8. "Home on the Range"
9. "It Ain't Gonna Rain No More"
10. "A Bicycle Built for Two (Daisy, Daisy)"
11. "Mary Had a Little Lamb"
12. "Take Me Out to the Ball Game"
13. "Friends Lullaby" (Larry Groce)
14. "Old MacDonald Had a Farm"
15. "The Hokey Pokey" (Larry LaPrise, Charles Macak, and Taftt Baker)
16. "She'll Be Coming 'Round the Mountain"
17. "Ten Little Indians"
18. "The Green Grass Grew All Around"
19. "In the Good Old Summer Time"
20. "Animal Fair"
21. "Row, Row, Row Your Boat"
22. "I'm a Policeman" (Larry Groce)
23. "Pop! Goes the Weasel"
24. "Dixie" (Dan Emmett)
25. "Twinkle, Twinkle, Little Star"
