= El Capricho (Madrid Metro) =

Madrid Metro station

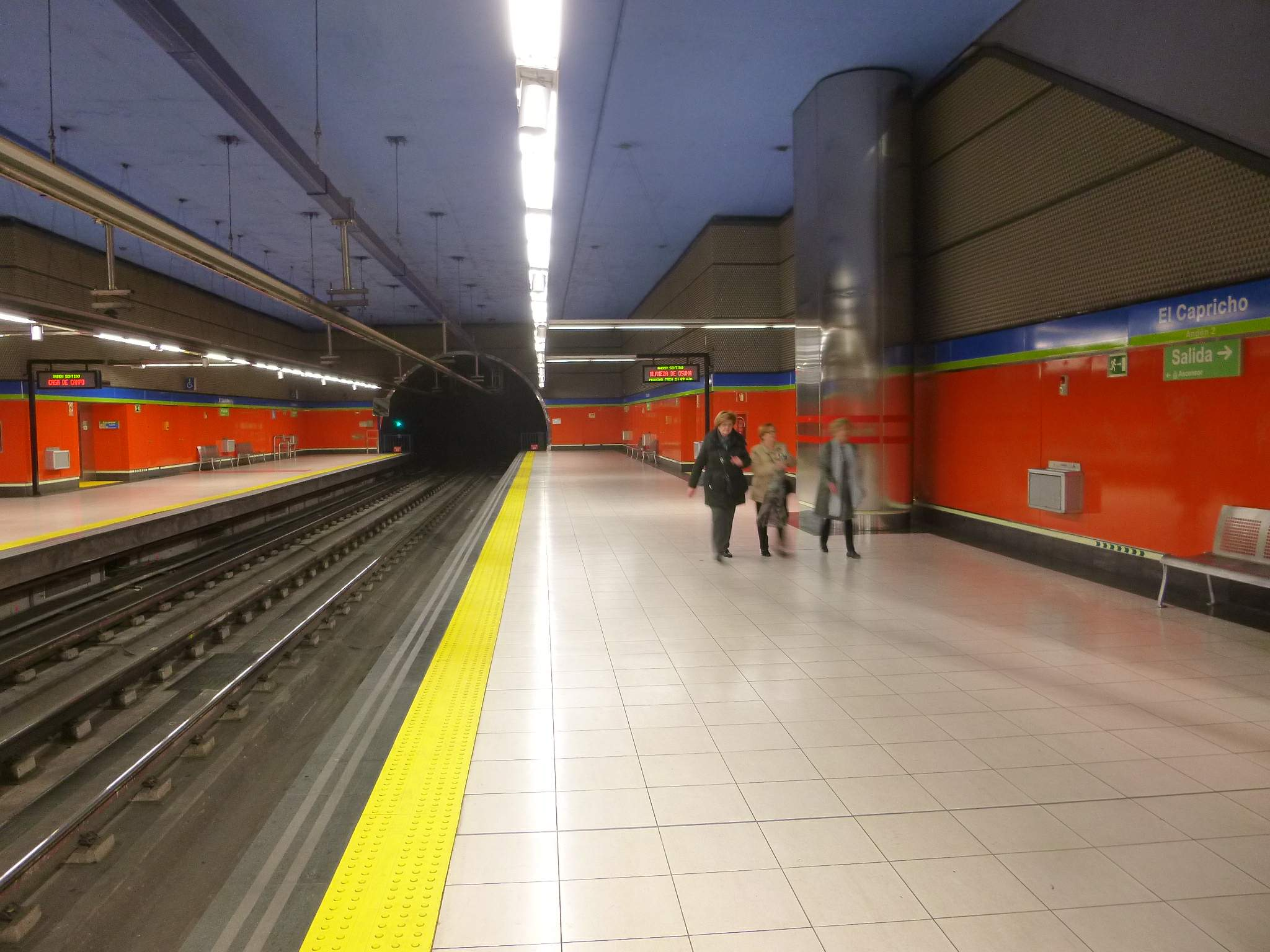

General information
- Location: Barajas, Madrid; Spain
- Coordinates: 40.4534705°N 3.5940073°W
- System: Madrid Metro station
- Owner: CRTM
- Operator: CRTM

Construction
- Accessible: yes

Other information
- Fare zone: A

History
- Opened: 24 November 2006

Services
Preceding station	Madrid Metro	Following station
Alameda de Osuna Terminus	Line 5	Canillejas towards Casa de Campo
Location
- Location within Madrid

El Capricho [el kaˈpɾitʃo] is a station on Line 5 of the Madrid Metro. It is located in fare Zone A.

The station is named after the Parque de El Capricho. There is a pedestrian route from the station to these gardens which were created by the Duchess of Osuna.
