= Torre Arias (Madrid Metro) =

Madrid Metro station

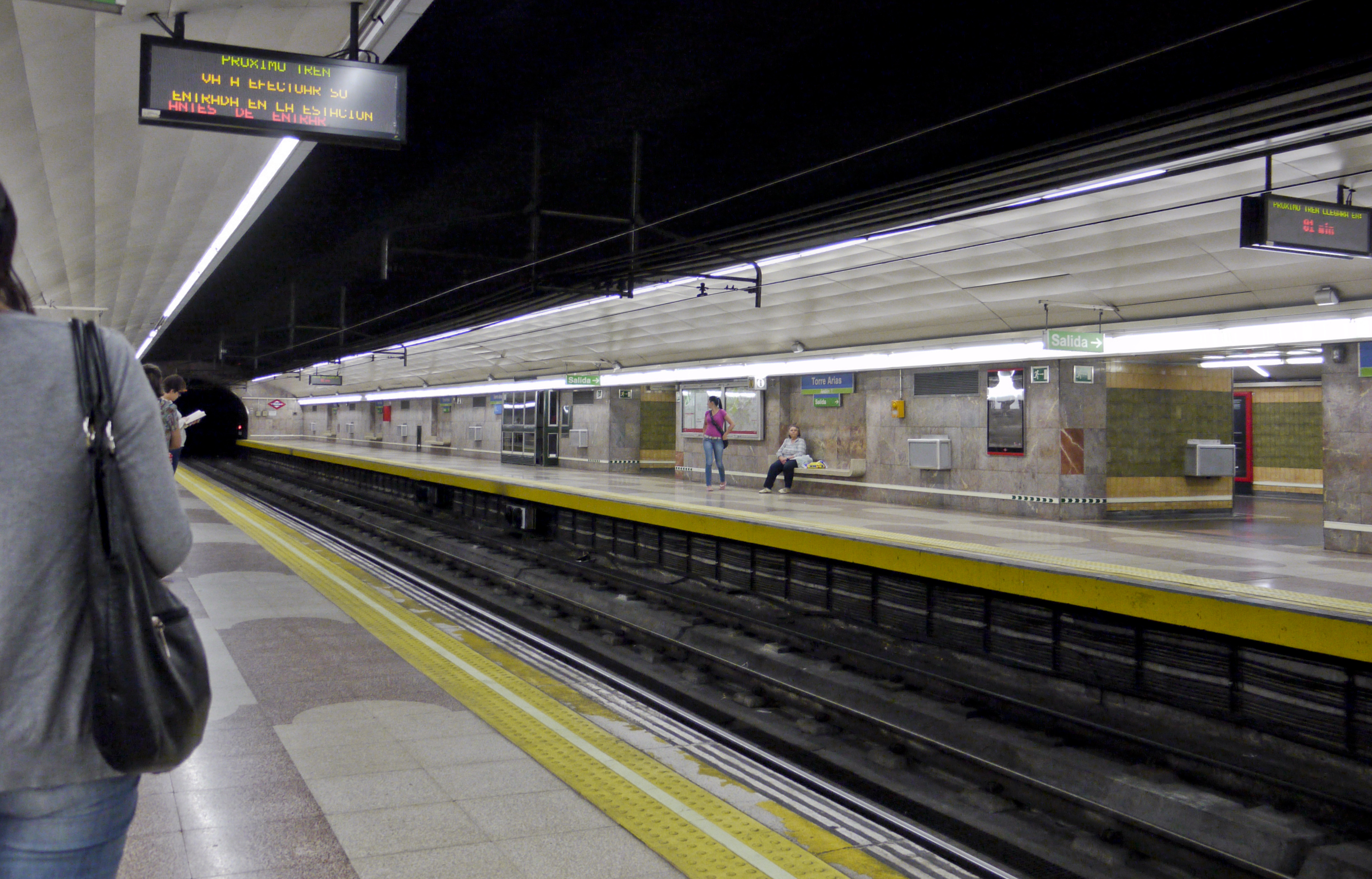

General information
- Location: San Blas, Madrid; Spain
- Coordinates: 40.4437467°N 3.6169981°W
- System: Madrid Metro station
- Owner: CRTM
- Operator: CRTM

Construction
- Accessible: No

Other information
- Fare zone: A

History
- Opened: 18 January 1980

Services
Preceding station	Madrid Metro	Following station
Canillejas towards Alameda de Osuna	Line 5	Suanzes towards Casa de Campo
Location
- Location within Madrid

Torre Arias [ˈtore ˈaɾjas] is a station on Line 5 of the Madrid Metro, located southeast of the Quinta de Torre Arias park and the Torre Arias castle. It is located in fare Zone A.
