= Canillejas (Madrid Metro) =

Madrid Metro station

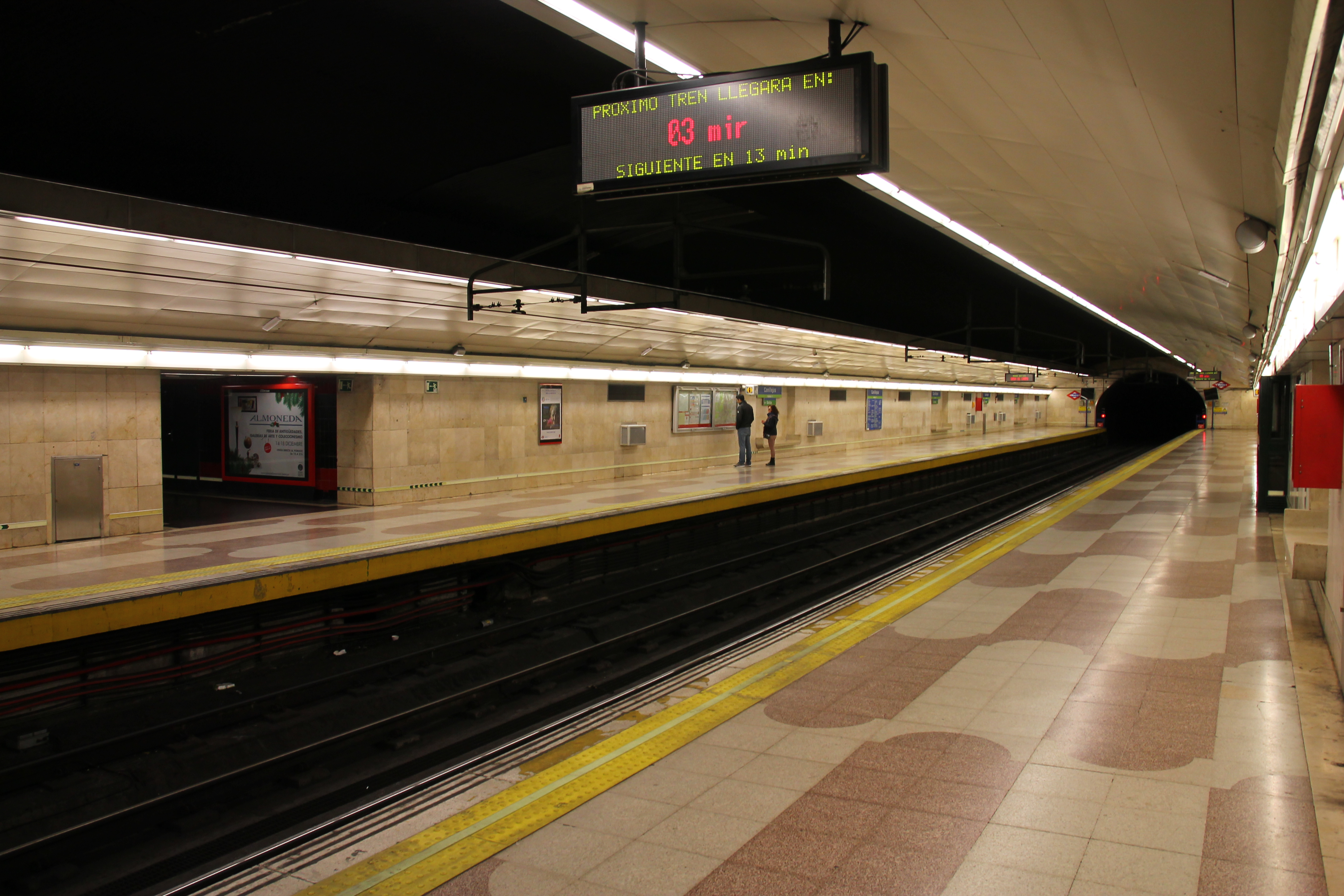

General information
- Location: San Blas, Madrid; Spain
- Coordinates: 40.449424°N 3.6081585°W
- System: Madrid Metro station
- Owner: CRTM
- Operator: CRTM

Construction
- Accessible: No

Other information
- Fare zone: A

History
- Opened: 18 January 1980

Services
| Preceding station | Madrid Metro | Following station |
|---|---|---|
| El Capricho towards Alameda de Osuna | Line 5 | Torre Arias towards Casa de Campo |
Location
- Location within Madrid

Canillejas [ka.niˈʝe.xas] is a station on Line 5 of the Madrid Metro, located in the barrio Canillejas. It is located in fare Zone A.

Canillejas serves an interurban bus station for buses towards Alcalá de Henares, Torrejón de Ardoz and Guadalajara, Castile-La Mancha. It also used to be the terminus of Line 5 from 1980 until 2006, when the extension towards Alameda de Osuna was opened.
