= The Dizzy Acrobat =

- Directed by: Alex Lovy
- Story by: Ben Hardaway; Milt Schaffer
- Produced by: Walter Lantz
- Starring: Kent Rogers
- Music by: Darrell Calker
- Animation by: Emery Hawkins
- Color process: Technicolor
- Production company: Walter Lantz Productions
- Distributed by: Universal Pictures
- Release date: May 21, 1943
- Running time: 6:40
- Country: United States
- Language: English

The Dizzy Acrobat is the eighth animated cartoon short subject in the Woody Woodpecker series. Released theatrically on May 21, 1943, the film was produced by Walter Lantz Productions and distributed by Universal Pictures.

== Plot ==
Woody Woodpecker visits a traveling circus. He attempts to sneak into the big top but a caretaker kicks him out. He says that if Woody wants to see the show, he will have to water the elephant. Woody attaches the elephant to a water spout and attempts again to enter the tent.

The caretaker chases him around the circus and into the big top. He continues to try to catch Woody but finds himself caught in several circus performance contraptions, including a trapeze, a tightrope walking, a perch pole, a lion's cage and a bicycle.

== Academy Award ==
The Dizzy Acrobat was nominated for an Academy Award in 1943 for Best Short Subject, Cartoons. It lost to MGM's The Yankee Doodle Mouse, the first of seven Tom and Jerry cartoons to win this award. It was the fifth film from Walter Lantz to be nominated in this category.

== Cultural references ==
- Woody sings the popular children's tune "Animal Fair" at the start of the cartoon.
- A sign indicates that the circus's Rubber Man is "Gone for the duration". This is a gag referencing the United States rationing of rubber during World War II.
- While Woody is on the trapeze, a variation of Johann Strauss II's "Blue Danube Waltz" can be heard in the background score.

== Notes ==
- The Dizzy Acrobat was Alex Lovy's final effort as director on a Woody short for about 12 years, as he was drafted into the US Navy. The next Woody "cartune" he would direct was 1955's The Tree Medic. He did not receive on-screen credit as director.
- This marks the final time Kent Rogers provided the voice for Woody. Dick Nelson would voice the character in Ration Bored before Ben Hardaway took over as the bird's voice in 1944's The Barber of Seville.
