= The Big Rock Candy Mountain (novel) =

1943 semi-autobiographical novel by Wallace Stegner

- First edition cover
- Author: Wallace Stegner
- Language: English
- Publisher: Duell, Sloan and Pearce
- Publication date: 1943
- LC Class: PZ3.S818 Bi

The Big Rock Candy Mountain is a 1943 semi-autobiographical novel by American writer Wallace Stegner. It follows the life of the Mason family (Bo and Elsa with their sons Chester and Bruce) during the early 20th century in the United States and Canada. The book is structured in ten sections.

The fictional family in the book, like Stegner's family during his childhood, frequently moves to different cities in pursuit of various financial schemes that never work out. The novel also matches Stegner's family history in some of the specific locations lived, including Saskatchewan and Salt Lake City. The novel is named after the folk song "The Big Rock Candy Mountains", which is about a mythical paradise.

== Plot summary ==
=== Section I ===
Elsa leaves her family home after breaking with her widowed father when he becomes remarried to Elsa's best friend. She moves to North Dakota where she meets Bo Mason, who runs an illegal saloon or blind pig. Despite being disturbed by Bo's sometimes violent behavior, Elsa strikes up a romantic relationship with him. Against her father's advice, she becomes engaged to Bo.

=== Section II ===
The Masons try unsuccessfully to run a hotel, with sons Chester and Bruce now in early childhood. Bo's relationship with Bruce becomes increasingly abusive, especially around issues of toilet training. After an especially strong outburst of violence against Bruce, Bo abandons his family.

=== Section III ===
Bo has begun to establish a relatively stable life for himself running a bunkhouse in Saskatchewan. In the meantime, Elsa moves back in with her father after her son Chester gets in trouble for engaging in sexual play with a girl in the orphanage he attends. After returning home, Elsa considers getting a divorce and marrying a former suitor, but eventually she accepts Bo's offer of reconciliation.

=== Section IV ===
This short section of the book is told from the perspective of Bruce. The family spends an idyllic summer at their homestead. Also, Bruce begins to regain memories of the abuses he suffered in infancy.

=== Section V ===
The 1918 flu epidemic has arrived. Down on his luck, Bo realizes that because of the flu epidemic he stands to make a small fortune if he begins bootlegging whisky to Canada, due to the perceived medicinal benefits of alcohol. While Bo is away in the United States purchasing whisky, the flu epidemic hits his home town and eventually Chester is forced to guard the family homestead himself while all the other family members are sick.

=== Section VI ===
It is now the Prohibition Era. Bo has supported his family for several years by bootlegging, but eventually the family decides to leave the small Canadian town they live in on the Canada/Montana border after Bo is arrested for bootlegging on the same day his son, Chester, is arrested for arson.

=== Section VII ===
The family is now living in Salt Lake City, Utah, and Chester Mason is about to graduate from high school. His parents attempt to steer him away from his romance with an older girl, Laura, and into a promising career as a baseball player. However, when the Masons' house is raided by the police, Chester quits his baseball job and elopes with Laura.

=== Section VIII ===
Bruce's study at law school is interrupted when he learns that Chester has died. In addition, his mother's cancer is worsening, and eventually Bruce returns to his family for his mother's sake.

=== Section IX ===
Elsa Mason dies of cancer, and a rift subsequently develops between Bo and Bruce Mason, during which Bruce considers murdering his father.

=== Section X ===
This section is told first from the perspective of Bo Mason, who is now an aging widower in Salt Lake City, oppressed by frequent feelings of self-hatred. Eventually Bo kills himself after murdering a former lover. Bruce then attempts to look back on the tumultuous history of his family and try to come to terms with his role as the sole survivor.
