= Cockaigne =

Mythical land of luxury

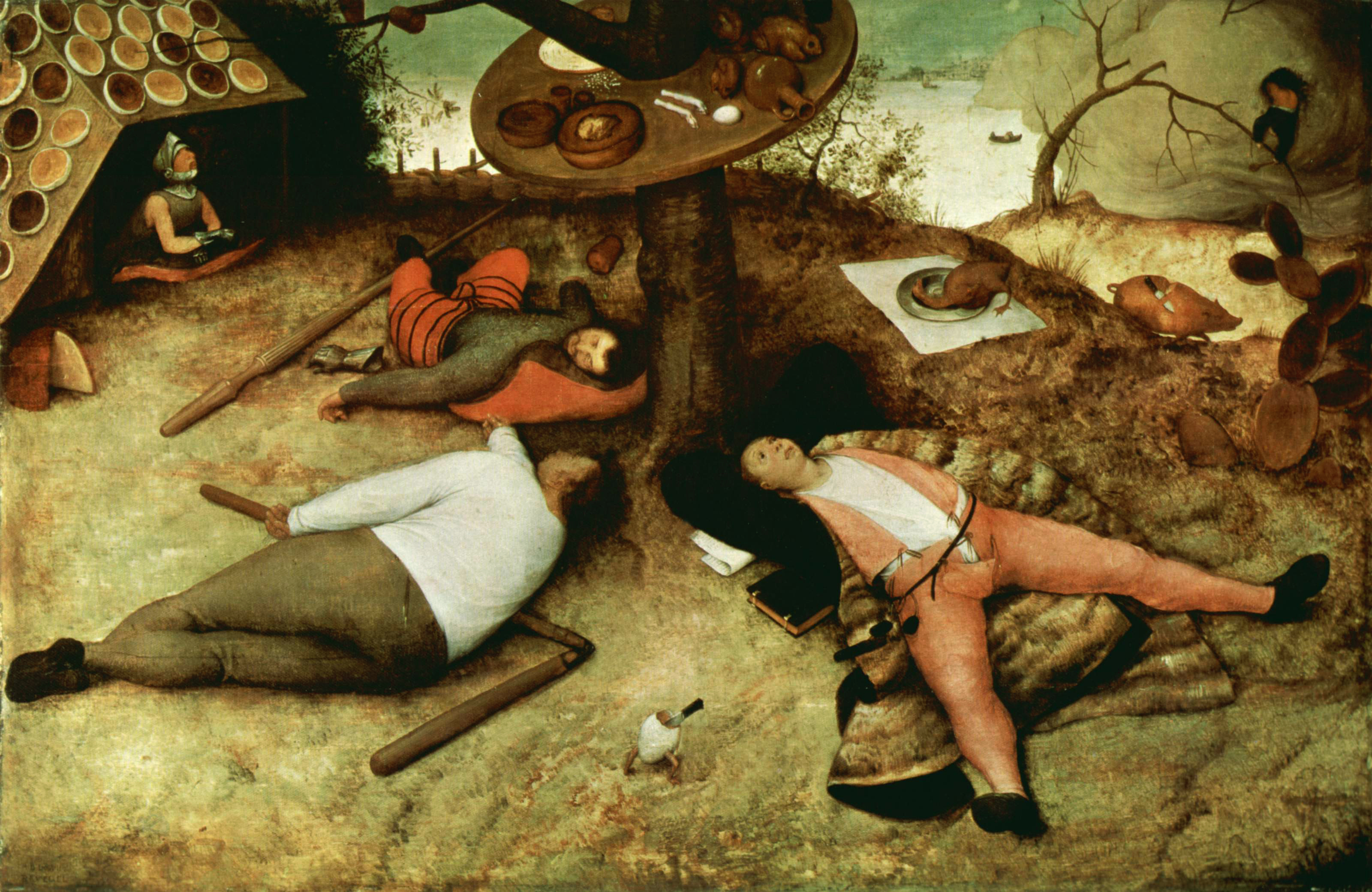
Pieter Bruegel the Elder: Luilekkerland ("The Land of Cockaigne"), oil on panel (1567; Alte Pinakothek, Munich)

Cockaigne or Cockayne (/kɒˈkeɪn/) is a land of plenty in medieval myth, an imaginary place of luxury and ease, comfort and pleasure, opposite to the harshness of medieval peasant life. In poems like The Land of Cockaigne, it is a land of contraries, where all the restrictions of society are defied (abbots beaten by their monks), sexual liberty is open (nuns showing their bottoms), and food is plentiful (skies that rain cheese). Cockaigne appeared frequently in Goliard verse. It represented both wish fulfillment and resentment at scarcity and Christian asceticism.

Cockaigne was a "medieval peasant’s dream, offering relief from backbreaking labor and the daily struggle for meager food."

== Etymology ==
While the first recorded uses of the word are the Latin Cucaniensis and the Middle English Cokaygne, one line of reasoning has the name tracing to Middle French (pays de) cocaigne "(land of) plenty", ultimately from a word for a small sweet cake sold to children at a fair. In Ireland, it was mentioned in the Kildare Poems, composed c. 1350. In Italian, the same place is called Paese della Cuccagna; the Dutch equivalent is Luilekkerland ("lazy, delicious land"), translated from the Middle Dutch word Cockaengen, and the German equivalent is Schlaraffenland. In Spanish, an equivalent place is named Jauja, after a rich mining region of the Andes, and País de Cucaña ("fools' paradise") may also signify such a place. From Swedish dialect lubber ("fat lazy fellow") comes Lubberland, popularized in the ballad An Invitation to Lubberland.

In the 1820s, the name Cockaigne came to be applied jocularly to London as the land of Cockneys ("Cockney" from a "cock's egg", an implausible creature; see also basilisk), though the two are not linguistically connected otherwise. The composer Edward Elgar used the word "Cockaigne" for his concert overture and suite evoking the people of London, Cockaigne (In London Town), Op. 40 (1901).

The Dutch villages of Kockengen and Koekange may be named after Cockaigne, though this has been disputed. The surname Cockayne also derives from the mythical land, and was originally a nickname for an idle dreamer.

The name of the drug cocaine is unrelated: it was named in 1860 by Albert Niemann from the plant coca (Quechua kúka) and the suffix -ine used to form chemical terms.

== Descriptions ==
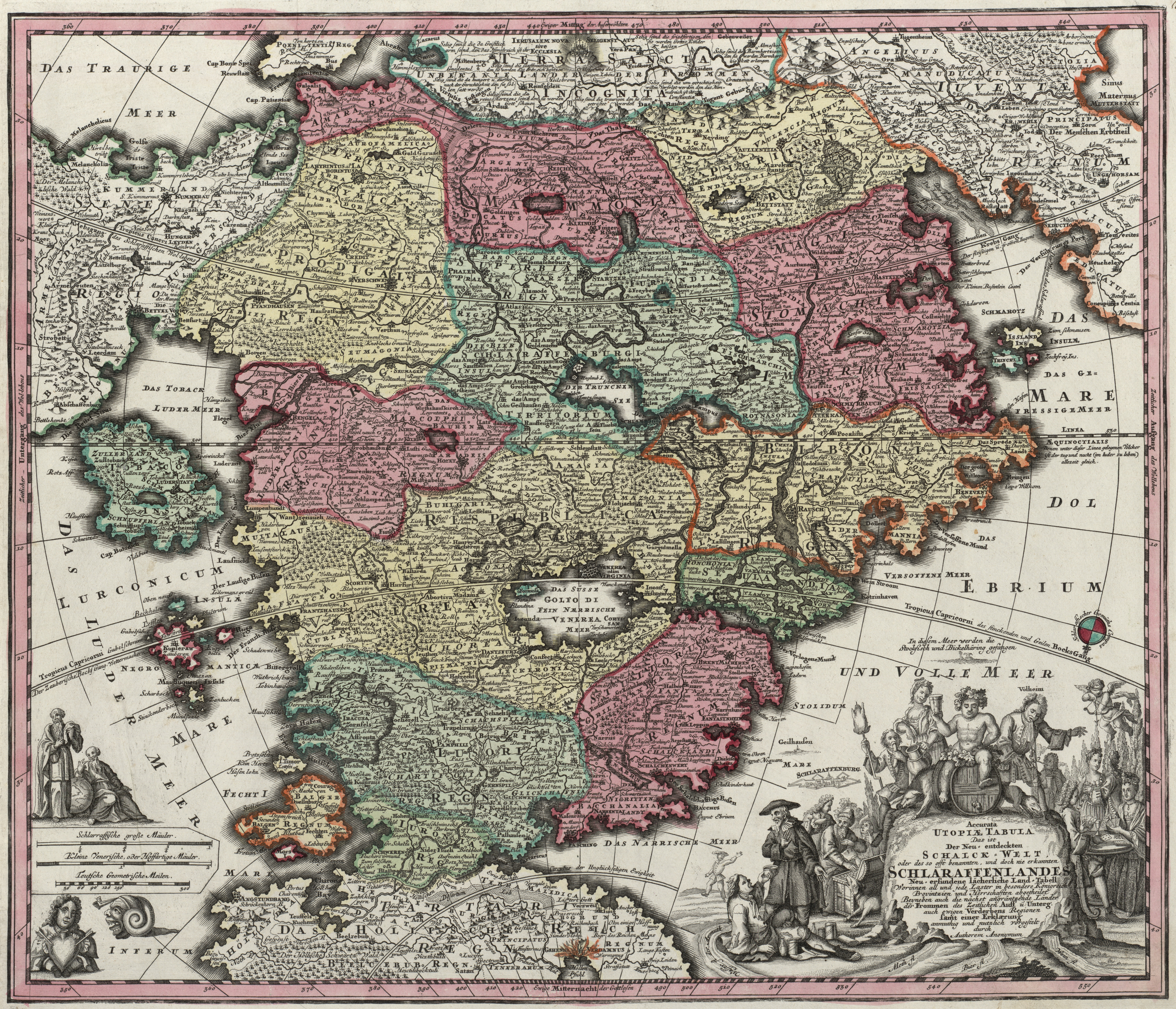
Accurata Utopiae Tabula, an "accurate map of Utopia", Johann Baptist Homann's map of Schlaraffenland published by Matthäus Seutter, Augsburg 1730

Like Atlantis and El Dorado, the land of Cockaigne was a utopia. It was a fictional place where, in a parody of paradise, idleness and gluttony were the principal occupations. In Specimens of Early English Poets (1790), George Ellis printed a 13th-century French poem called "The Land of Cockaigne" where "the houses were made of barley sugar and cakes, the streets were paved with pastry, and the shops supplied goods for nothing".

According to Herman Pleij, Dreaming of Cockaigne: Medieval Fantasies of the Perfect Life (2003):

roasted pigs wander about with knives in their backs to make carving easy, where grilled geese fly directly into one's mouth, where cooked fish jump out of the water and land at one's feet. The weather is always mild, the wine flows freely, sex is readily available, and all people enjoy eternal youth.

== Traditions ==
A Neapolitan and Southern Italian tradition, extended to Southern Italian diaspora communities and other Latin culture countries, is the Cockaigne pole (Italian: cuccagna; Spanish: cucaña; Filipino: palo sebo), a horizontal or vertical pole with a prize (like a ham) at one end. The pole is then coated in grease or soap and planted during a festival. Then, daring people try to climb the slippery pole to get the prize. The crowd laughs at the often failed attempts to hold on to the pole.

== Legacy ==
=== Place-names ===
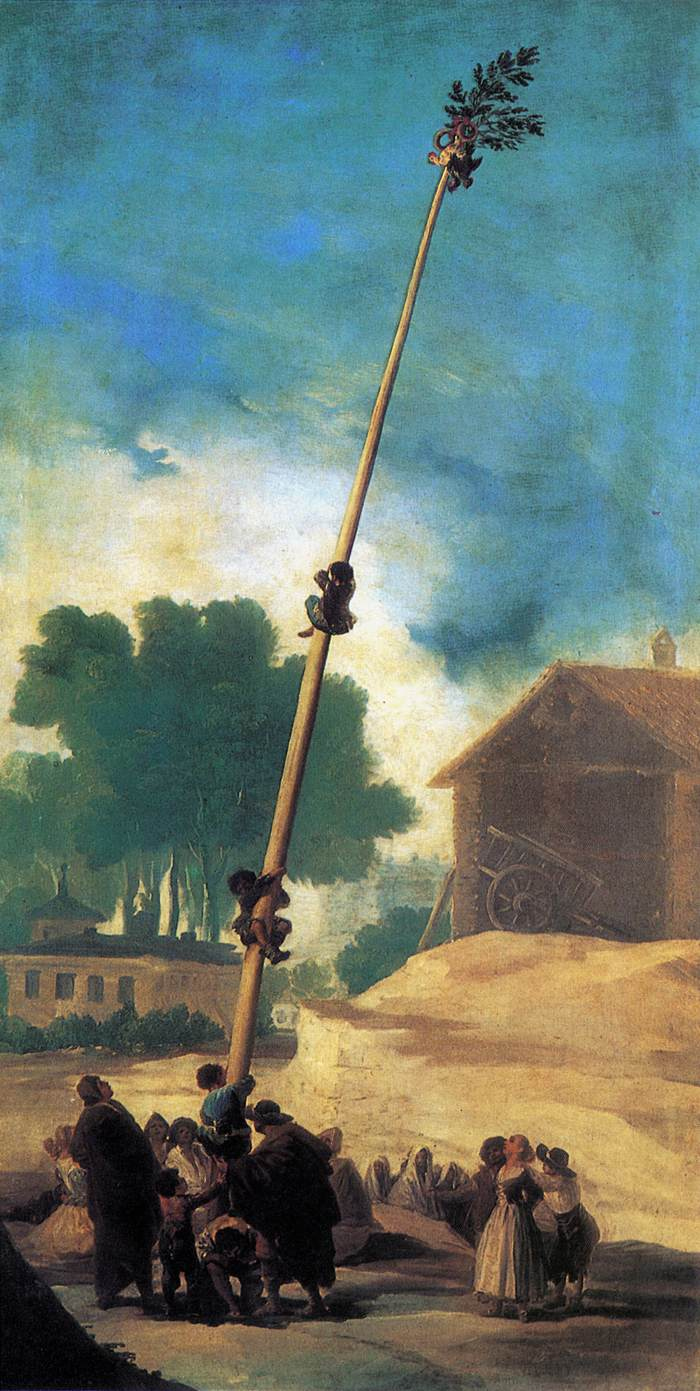
Francisco Goya: La cucaña ("The Greasy Pole", c. 1786)

- The Dutch village of Kockengen in the province of Utrecht is likely to have been named after Cockaigne by the local clergy, who established farms and peat-cutting settlements in the area.
- The Canadian town of Cocagne, New Brunswick, at the mouth of the Cocagne river, was named after Cockaigne.
- The English village of Cockayne Hatley in Bedfordshire was named after the Cokayne family, who took possession of the land in 1417.
- Cockayne in Bransdale, within the North York Moors National Park in North Yorkshire.

=== Literature ===
- "Ego sum abbas Cucaniensis" ("I am the Abbot of Cockaigne") is one of the drinking songs (Carmina potatoria) found in the 13th-century manuscript of Songs from Benediktbeuern, better known for its inclusion in Carl Orff's secular cantata, Carmina Burana (1935-36).
- "L'invitation au voyage", a prose-poem by the French poet Charles Baudelaire, found in his collection Paris Spleen (1869), makes reference to the "land of Cocaigne", there envisioned as a country in keeping with Baudelaire's poetic ideals, such as silence, decorum, indolence, and artifice. He describes it as "the East of the West, the China of Europe", as he describes it as being located to the North and as being possessed of qualities thought of as being essentially "Oriental" by the Europeans of the time.
- The Land of Toys (or Pleasure Island) from The Adventures of Pinocchio (1883) is said to be located in Cockaigne.
- James Branch Cabell in his Jurgen: A Comedy of Justice (1919), has the land of Cocaigne between the lands of sunrise and morning. ch XXIV. "Thus Jurgen abode for a little over two months in Cocaigne, and complied with the customs of that country. Nothing altered in Cocaigne: but in the world wherein Jurgen was reared, he knew, it would by this time be September, with the leaves flaring gloriously, and the birds flocking southward, and the hearts of Jurgen's fellows turning to not unpleasant regrets. But in Cocaigne there was no regret and no variability, but only an interminable flow of curious pleasures, illumined by the wandering star of Venus Mechanitis."
- Clark Ashton Smith wrote a romantic prose poem titled "In Cocaigne" (1922).
- English occultist Aleister Crowley titled a chapter in his novel The Diary of a Drug Fiend "Au Pays de Cocaine", a play on the French translation of the phrase and the drug cocaine.
- “The Land of Cockaigne” is the first poem in the 2015 book The Emperor of Water Clocks by Yusef Komunyakaa, an American poet who won the Pulitzer Prize for Poetry in 1994.

=== Painting ===
- "The Land of Cockaigne" was depicted by Pieter Bruegel the Elder in his painting Luilekkerland (1567).
- Cockaigne, a 2003 painting by Vincent Desiderio.

=== Music ===
- Cockaigne (In London Town) is a concert overture composed by Edward Elgar in 1901.
- The folk song "The Big Rock Candy Mountains", first recorded by Harry McClintock in 1928, depicts a hobo's idea of paradise along the lines of Cockaigne, with "cigarette trees" and hens that lay soft-boiled eggs.
- The album Land of Cockayne (1981) by Soft Machine.
- Edenbridge's song The Most Beautiful Place mentions "You are what I call Cockaign".
- Jacques Brel's song Le Plat Pays mentions "Et de noirs clochers comme mâts de cocagne" (and black steeples like cockaigne poles)
- Carl Orff’s choral work Carmina Burana, a musical setting of anonymous mediæval ribald verse in Latin and Middle Low German, includes the song Ego sum abbas Cucaniensis or "I am the abbot of Cockaigne".
- A song "The Land of Cockaigne" can be found on the 2017 album A Coat Worth Wearing by the Scots-born Sheffield-based musician Neil McSweeney.
- A reference to Aleister Crowley's play on the phrase in The Diary of a Drug Fiend appears in a song titled “Au Pays du Cocaine” on the 2025 album Getting Killed by American rock band Geese.
- A song ”The Land of Cokaygne” can be found on the 2026 album “Cursed Be Those Mariners, They Lead a Wicked Life” by the Finnish musician Joose Keskitalo.

=== Comics ===
- Cockaigne is the home of Narda, the wife of Mandrake the Magician (created by Lee Falk).
- Cockaigne is mentioned in The League of Extraordinary Gentlemen by Alan Moore, mainly in the form of written accounts given by Mina Harker and Fanny Hill

=== Film ===
- Hans Trutz in the Land of Plenty, a 1917 German fantasy film by Paul Wegener.
- Mischief in Wonderland, a 1957 German fantasy film starring Alexander Engel.
- Pays de cocagne, a 1971 documentary film directed by Pierre Étaix.

=== Various ===
- The Joy of Cooking (first edition 1931) uses the word "Cockaigne" to indicate that the recipe was a favorite of the authors' parents.
- A ski resort in Cherry Creek, New York bore the name Cockaigne until its 2011 closure. New ownership announced the resort would reopen in December 2019.
- Nick Bostrom discusses Cockaigne as an example of the simplest type of utopia, that of endless material abundance, in the philosophy book Deep Utopia.

== See also ==
- Arcadia (utopia)
- Fiddler's Green
- Cloud cuckoo land
