= Disney Children's Favorite Songs 4 =

Disney's Children's Favorites, Volume 4
- Artwork for 1996 re-release

Compilation album by Larry Groce and the Disneyland Children's Sing-Along Chorus
- Released: 1990 (original release); 1991 (re-release); 1992 (Special Edition); 1993 (re-release); 1996 (re-release)
- Recorded: 1980 (track 19), 1989–1990
- Genre: Children
- Length: 46:40 (1990, 1991, 1993 and 1996 releases)
- Label: Walt Disney
- Producers: Ted Kryczko; Pat Patrick

Larry Groce and the Disneyland Children's Sing-Along Chorus chronology
Disney Children's Favorite Songs 3 (1986)	Disney's Children's Favorites, Volume 4 (1990)

Professional ratings
Review scores
Source	Rating
AllMusic	4.5/5 stars

Disney's Children's Favorites, Volume 4 is the fourth and final entry of the Disney's Children's Favorites series. The album contains 27 classic children's songs.

== Track listing ==
1. "Oh, Where, Oh, Where Has My Little Dog Gone?" (Septimus Winner)
2. "The Wheels on the Bus" (Verna Hills)
3. "Do Your Ears Hang Low?"
4. "Dry Bones" (James Weldon Johnson and J. Rosamond Johnson)
5. "The Wabash Cannonball"
6. "Brother, Come and Dance with Me" (Engelbert Humperdinck)
7. "A Frog Went a-Courting"
8. "The Big Rock Candy Mountains"
9. "Kookaburra"
10. "You Are My Sunshine" (Jimmie Davis and Charles Mitchell)
11. "Funiculi, Funicula" (Luigi Denza and Peppino Turco; English lyrics by Edward Oxenford)
12. "Old Dan Tucker"
13. "It's a Small World" (Richard M. Sherman and Robert B. Sherman)
14. "Camping" (Larry Groce)
15. "There's a Hole in My Bucket"
16. "Cockles and Mussels"
17. "I'm a Little Teapot" (George Harry Sanders and Clarence Kelley)
18. "Comin' Through the Rye"
19. "Git Along, Little Dogies"
20. "Reuben and Rachel" (William Gooch and Harry Birch)
21. "He's Got the Whole World in His Hands"
22. Nursery Rhyme Medley: "Hickory Dickory Dock" / "Jack and Jill" / "Jack Be Nimble"
23. "Down by the Station"
24. "Meet Me In St. Louis" (Kerry Mills and Andrew B. Sterling)
25. "The Marvelous Toy" (Tom Paxton)
26. "Go In and Out the Window" (Lew Pollack)
27. "Mickey Mouse March" (Jimmie Dodd)
