= Disney Children's Favorite Songs 2 =

Disney's Children's Favorites, Volume 2
- Artwork for 1996 re-release

Compilation album by Larry Groce and the Disneyland Children's Sing-Along Chorus
- Released: August 1979 (original release); 1986 (re-release); 1990 (re-release); 1991 (re-release); 1992 (Special Edition); 1993 (re-release); 1996 (re-release)
- Recorded: 1976, 1978–1979
- Genre: Children
- Length: 45:53 (1979, 1986, 1990, 1991, 1993 and 1996 releases)
- Labels: Disneyland (1979 and 1986 releases); Walt Disney (1990, 1991, 1992 Special Edition, 1993 and 1996 releases)
- Producer: Jymn Magon

Larry Groce and the Disneyland Children's Sing-Along Chorus chronology
Disney Children's Favorite Songs 1 (1979)	Disney's Children's Favorites, Volume 2 (1979)	Disney Children's Favorite Songs 3 (1986)

Professional ratings
Review scores
Source	Rating
AllMusic	3/5 stars

Disney's Children's Favorites, Volume 2 is the second entry of the Disney's Children's Favorites series. The album contains 25 classic children's songs.

== Track listing ==
1. "The Farmer in the Dell"
2. "Yankee Doodle"
3. "On Top of Old Smokey"
4. Sailing Medley: "Blow the Man Down"/"My Bonnie Lies Over the Ocean"/"Sailing, Sailing"/"Drunken Sailor"
5. "Camptown Races" (Stephen Foster)
6. "Old Blue"
7. "Here We Go Loopty Loo"
8. "The Sidewalks of New York"
9. "Shortnin' Bread"
10. "John Jacob Jingleheimer Schmidt"
11. "Thumbelina" (Larry Groce)
12. "The Bear Went Over the Mountain/"For He's a Jolly Good Fellow"
13. "Red River Valley"
14. "Skip to My Lou"
15. "Swanee River" (Stephen Foster)
16. Western Medley: "The Yellow Rose of Texas"/"Buffalo Gals"
17. "London Bridge Is Falling Down"
18. "Here We Go Round the Mulberry Bush"
19. "Frère Jacques"
20. "The Dump Truck Song" (Larry Groce)
21. "Bingo"
22. "Polly Wolly Doodle"
23. "There Was an Old Lady"
24. "Carrot Stew" (Larry Groce)
25. "When the Saints Go Marching In"
