= An Invitation to Lubberland =

Broadside ballad first printed in 1685

"An Invitation to Lubberland" was a broadside ballad first printed in 1685. Many believe that it inspired the hobo ballad which formed the basis of the song "The Big Rock Candy Mountains" recorded in 1928 by Harry McClintock. Lubberland is the Swedish name for Cockaigne, land of plenty in medieval myth.

== Lyrics ==
Sung to the tune of Billy and Molly or The Journey-man Shoemaker by Daniel Cooper.

There is a Ship we understand,
now riding in the River,
'Tis newly come from Lubberland,
the like I think was never:
You that a Lazy life do love,
I'd have you now go over,
They say the Land is not above
two thousand Leagues from Dover.
...
The Rivers run with Claret fine,
the Brooks with rich Canary,
The Ponds with other sorts of Wine,
to make your hearts full merry:
Nay, more then this, you may behold
the Fountains flows with Brandy,
The Rocks are right Refined Gold,
the Hills are Sugar-Candy.

— Stanzas 1 and 6
