= La cucaña =

1787 painting by Francisco Goya

The Greasy Pole
- Le Mât de cocagne (French), La cucaña (Spanish)
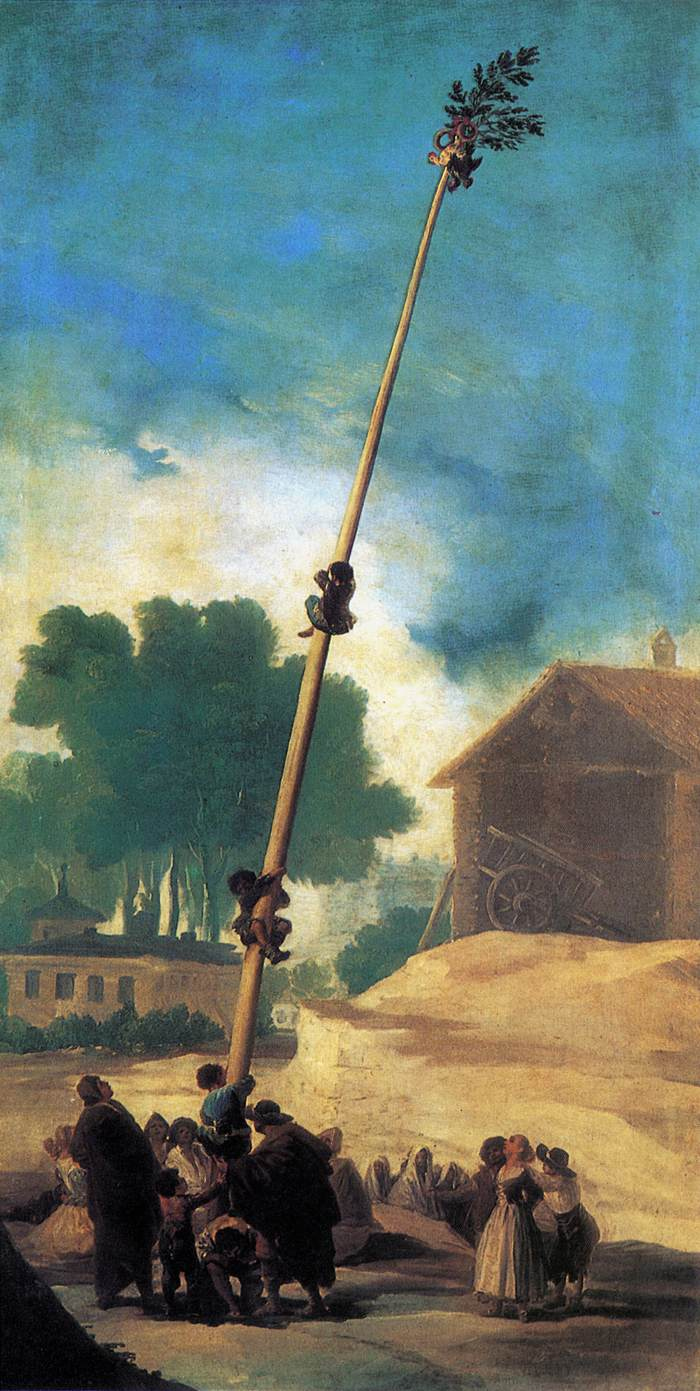
- Artist: Francisco de Goya
- Year: c. 1786–1787
- Medium: Oil on canvas
- Dimensions: 169 cm × 88 cm (67 in × 35 in)
- Location: Private collection, Madrid

The Greasy Pole (in Spanish: La cucaña, French: Le Mât de cocagne) is an oil painting on canvas executed ca. 1786–87 by the Spanish artist Francisco de Goya.

Like the others in his tapestry cartoons series, it is based on a popular scene of a vertical greased Cockaigne pole. The greasy pole was a popular theme of the iconography of the eighteenth century that Goya had already used for his tapestry drawings. During Cockaigne, boys climb and fight to reach the top of the pole. The background landscape is blurred, but it is possible to distinguish farms and a crowd gathered at the foot of the pole.

== See also ==
- List of works by Francisco Goya
- Cockaigne
- Greasy pole
