= Barnbrack =

- Origin: Belfast, Northern Ireland
- Genres: Pop, folk
- Years active: 1984–2003; 2009–present
- Label: Homespun
- Members: Alex Quinn
- Past members: Jimmy McPeake; Eoin McMahon

Barnbrack is a Northern Irish male vocal/instrumental folk/pop group, with band members Alex Quinn, Jimmy McPeake, and Eoin McMahon. The word 'barnbrack' is a play on the Anglicised Irish word "Barmbrack", a type of bread that contains fruit. Barnbrack separated in 2003, after the premature death of Quinn's wife, Deirdre, aged 55.

While Barnbrack has had many popular songs, such as "The Fly" and the "Unicorn Song", the band's only notable chart success was with a single called "Belfast", written by Lisburn-born man and band member Alex Quinn. The song described the feelings felt by an expatriate, who is planning to return to Ulster and the city he left behind. The song was released on the Homespun label. It entered the UK Singles Chart on 16 March 1985, and reached no. 45; it was in the chart for several weeks.

In 2009, the Belfast Telegraph reported that, after six years apart, the former members of the band were planning a reunion. The band is now back together and is currently touring Northern Ireland.
