= Valeriano Bozal =

Spanish historian and philosopher (1940–2023)

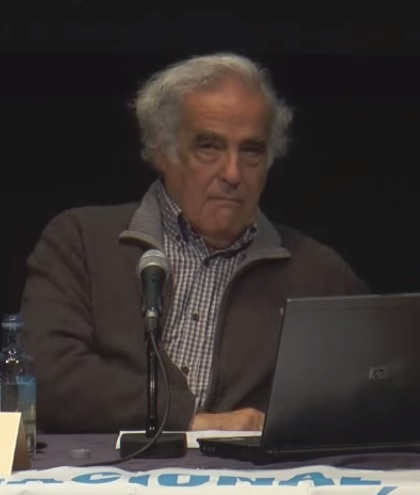
- Bozal in 2014
- Born: Valeriano Bozal Fernández; 24 November 1940; Madrid, Spain
- Died: 2 July 2023 (aged 82); Madrid, Spain
- Education: Complutense University of Madrid
- Occupations: Historian; Philosopher

Valeriano Bozal Fernández (24 November 1940 – 2 July 2023) was a Spanish historian and philosopher. He was a participant in the collaborative project Enciclopedia del Museo del Prado.

== Biography ==
Born in Madrid on 24 November 1940, Bozal graduated with a degree in philosophy from the Complutense University of Madrid and worked as a secondary school teacher before returning to teach at his alma mater in 1969. In 1974, he became a professor of contemporary and modern philosophy at the Autonomous University of Madrid.

In 1962, Bozal began publishing in journals and magazines, primarily on philosophy in the modern movement in the magazine Artes. He published his first work on realism at the Editorial Ciencia Nueva, which was affiliated with the Communist Party of Spain. He was also an ideologue of the Equipo Comunicación, where he published his ideas on capitalism and communism, and their impact on modern art and architecture.

Once the Francoist regime fell, Bozal directed the Communist Party of Spain's magazine, Nuestra bandera. In 1987, he became director of La balsa de la medusa, where he published theses on the works of Immanuel Kant. He also wrote about 20th century art in Spain, as well as the likes of Piero della Francesca, Johannes Vermeer, and Francisco Goya. In 2020, he received the Gold Medal of Merit in the Fine Arts. He was also a member of several societies, such as the Sociedad Española de Filosofía, the European Society of Culture and the Asociación Española de Críticos de Arte.

Valeriano Bozal died in Madrid on 2 July 2023, at the age of 82.

== Works ==
- El Realismo plástico en España de 1900 a 1936 (1967)
- El Lenguaje artístico (1970)
- El intelectual colectivo y el pueblo: ideología, politica, filosofía (1976)
- España, vanguardia artística y realidad social : 1936-1976 (1976)
- Una alternativa para la enseñanza (1977)
- El arte del siglo XX : La construcción de la vanguardia (1850-1939) (1978)
- La ilustración gráfica del siglo XIX en España (1979)
- Imagen de Goya (1983)
- Protagonistas de America: Diego Rivera (1987)
- Mímesis, la imágenes y las cosas (1987)
- Sátira y tragedia, las imágenes de Castelao (1987)
- Arte y ciudad en Galicia, siglo XIX (1990)
- Pintura y escultura españolas del siglo XX (1992)
- El grabado en España: siglos XV al XVIII (1992)
- Del impresionismo a las vanguardias : obras sobre papel (1993)
- Antes del informalismo. Arte español, 1940-1958: colección de arte contemporáneo (1996)
- Goya y el gusto moderno (1997)
- Pinturas negras de Goya (1997)
- Historia del Arte. T. 3: La Edad moderna (1998)
- Pablo Picasso (1999)
- El gusto (1999)
- Johannes Vermeer de Delft (2003)
- El Tiempo de estupor (2004)
- Arte solidario. Exposición conmemorativa del primer aniversario de los atentados en las estaciones de Atocha, El Pozo y Santa Eugenia (2005)
- Francisco Goya (2005)
- Luis Fernández (2005)
- Estudios de arte contemporáneo (2006)
- Historia del Arte en España. Desde los orígenes hasta la Ilustración (2010)
