= Alameda de Osuna =

- Ward
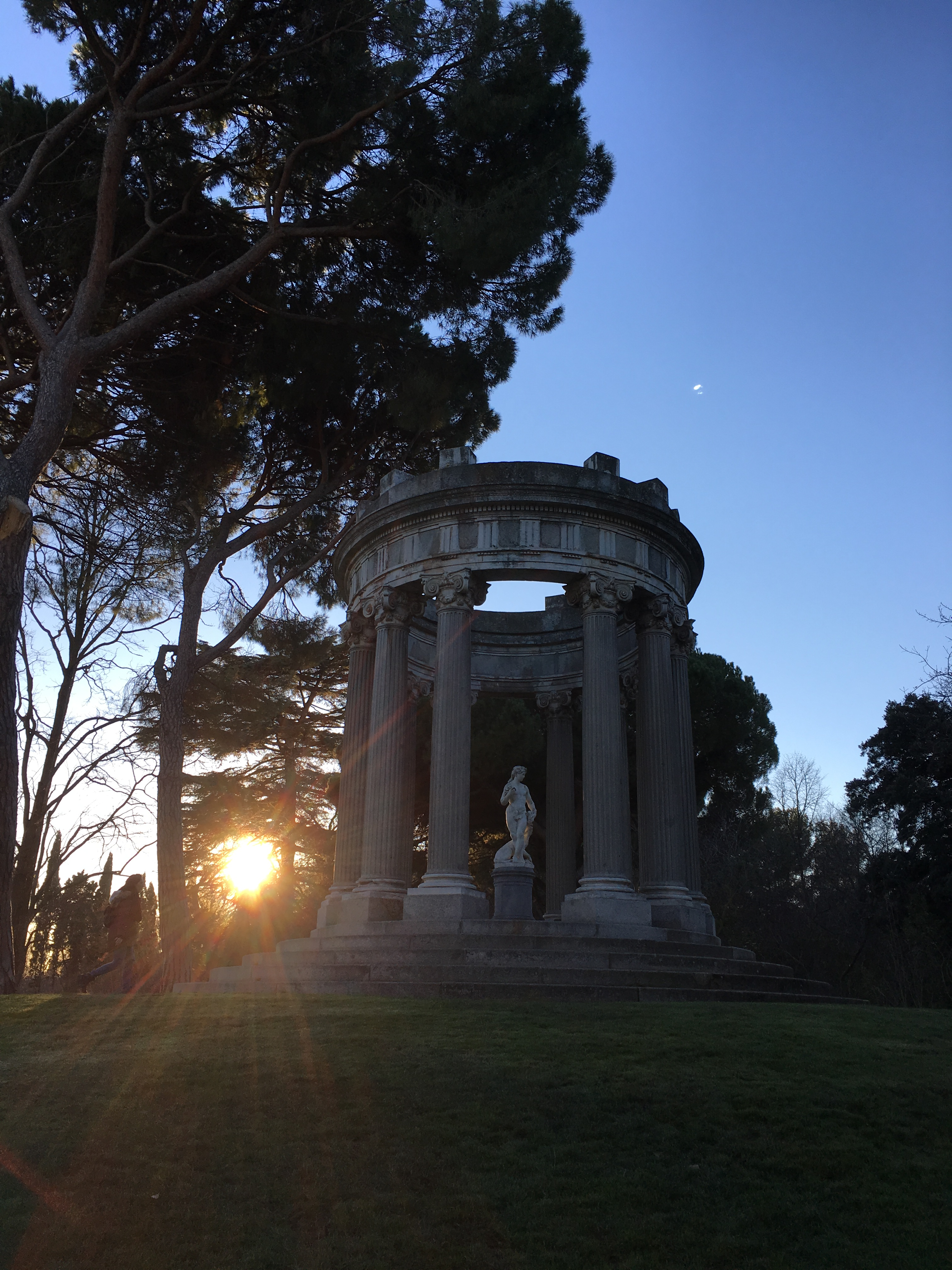
- Park of El Capricho, Madrid, Spain.

- Alameda de Osuna in Barajas district
- Country: Spain
- Aut. community: Madrid
- Municipality: Madrid
- District: Barajas

Alameda de Osuna is a ward (barrio) of Madrid belonging to the district of Barajas.

== See also ==
- Paintings for the alameda of the Dukes of Osuna
