= Larry Groce =

Artistic director of "Mountain Stage" radio show)

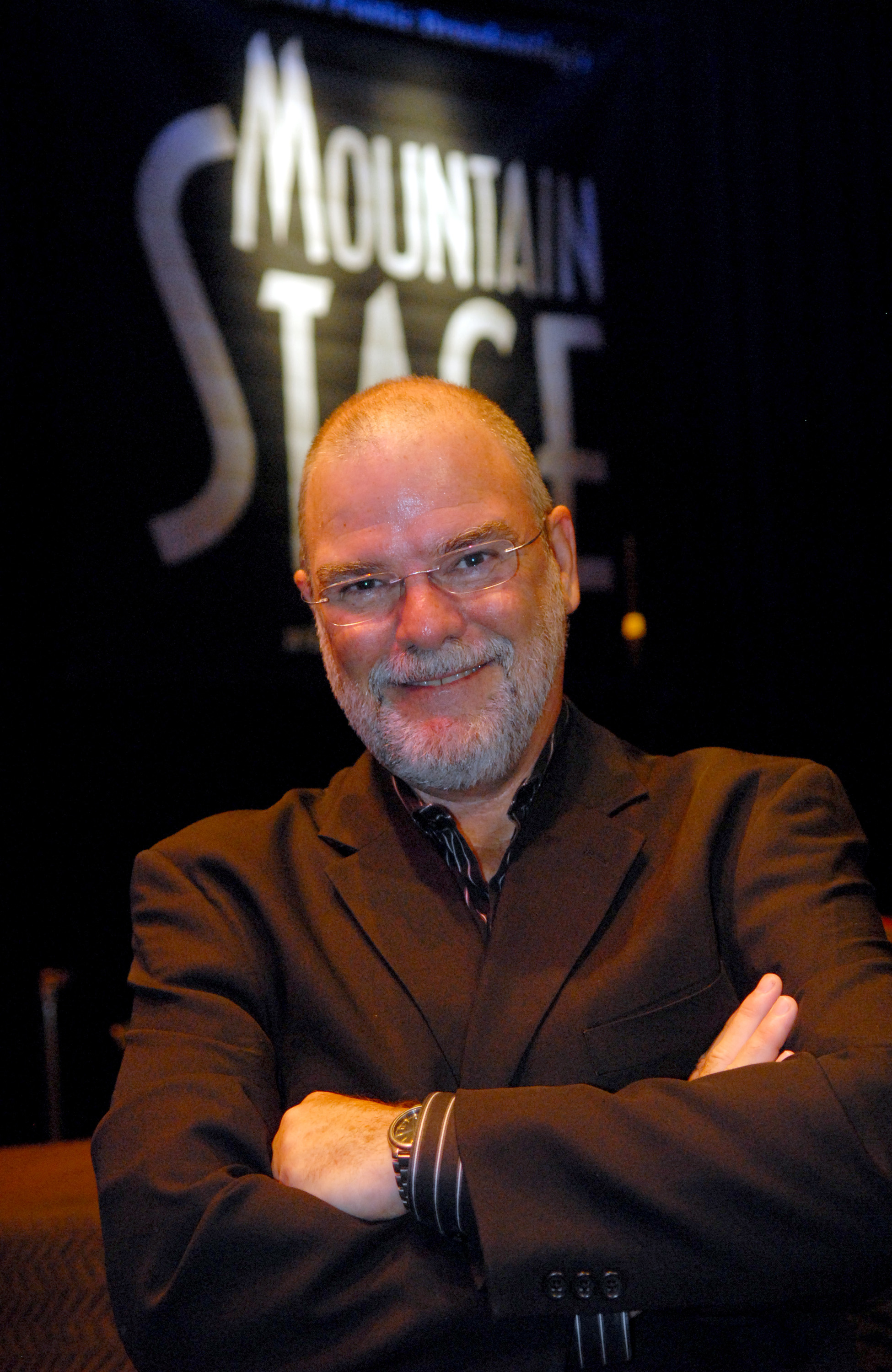

Background information
- Born: April 22, 1948 (age 78); Dallas, Texas, U.S.
- Genres: Country music; bluegrass music; folk; children's music
- Occupations: Singer-songwriter; radio host
- Instruments: Vocals; guitar
- Years active: 1971–present
- Labels: Walt Disney; Curb; K-tel

Larry Groce (born April 22, 1948) is an American singer-songwriter and radio host. From 1983 until 2021, Groce served as the host and artistic director of Mountain Stage, a two-hour live music radio program produced by West Virginia Public Broadcasting and distributed by NPR. He first entered the national spotlight in 1976 when his novelty song "Junk Food Junkie" became a Top Ten hit. After that, Groce's voice became well known by children and parents alike as a result of his Platinum recordings of children's folk songs for Walt Disney Records Children's Favorites four-volume series: Volume 1, Volume 2, Volume 3 and Volume 4 (released from 1979-1990).

== Biography ==
=== Early life ===
Groce was born in 1948 in Dallas to H.T. and Bobbie Groce, the eldest of three children. He has a younger brother, Gary (born July 7, 1951), and a younger sister, Janna (born April 8, 1961). He became interested in music while in elementary school. The family lived in the Oak Cliff section of Dallas and he attended Adamson High School there. His classmates included singer-songwriters Michael Martin Murphey, Ray Wylie Hubbard, and B. W. Stevenson.

=== Career ===
Groce's first album, a collection of hymns called Peace and Joy and Power for The First Church of Christ, Scientist, of which he is a member, was recorded in 1969 while he was still a college student at Principia College in Elsah, Illinois. After graduating in 1970, he moved to New York City and became a regular performer at a "Focus", an Upper West Side organic food restaurant and coffeehouse co-owned by future Hollywood producer and manager Larry Brezner. (Brezner's wife at the time, musician Melissa Manchester, was also a regular.) Later in 1970, Groce signed a recording contract with Daybreak Records, a subsidiary of RCA Records. His first album of original songs, The Wheat Lies Low, was released in 1970. From 1972 to 1985 he was a National Endowment for the Arts sponsored "musician-in-residence", visiting schools in twenty US states. Having a residency brought him to West Virginia in 1972, where he has lived ever since.

In 1976, his satiric novelty song "Junk Food Junkie" became a Billboard top-ten hit and led to appearances on The Tonight Show, The Merv Griffin Show, American Bandstand, The Midnight Special, The Rich Little Show, Nashville Now, The Disney Channel, Dr. Demento, and A Prairie Home Companion. Between 1979 and 1990, Groce performed on nine Disney albums, one of which was certified gold and five certified platinum. His first Disney recording, Winnie-the-Pooh for President, was nominated for a Grammy in the category of "Best Recording for Children" in 1976.

In 1983, Groce co-founded Mountain Stage, a two-hour live music program produced by West Virginia Public Radio and distributed nationally and internationally by NPR and Voice of America's satellite radio service to over 200 stations. He was its host, producer and artistic director. His musical tastes have been instrumental in defining the sound of the show. Mountain Stage was the first nationally broadcast radio or television program to feature live performances by Lyle Lovett, Mary Chapin Carpenter, Sheryl Crow, Barenaked Ladies, Alison Krauss, Ani DiFranco, Phish, Counting Crows, Ben Harper, Ryan Adams, Sarah McLachlan, Tori Amos, Lucinda Williams, David Gray, the Avett Brothers, and Laura Nyro, whose performance at Mountain Stage was released on CD three years after her death. The show has also featured musical pioneers including Bill Monroe, Ralph Stanley, Doc Watson, Pops Staples and Brownie McGhee as well as modern superstars R.E.M., Martina McBride and Norah Jones. Groce retired from hosting Mountain Stage in 2021; his successor is Kathy Mattea.

In 2016, Groce released his first recording in 27 years Live Forever with his wife, violist Sandra Groce. It includes four originals and eight covers, and includes the full version of the Mountain Stage theme song, "Simple Song." In 2017, Larry Groce was named West Virginian of the Year by the Charleston Gazette-Mail, and in 2020, was inducted into the West Virginia Music Hall of Fame.

=== Side projects ===
In 1990, he starred in Paradise Park, a low budget feature film made in West Virginia about life in a Mountain State trailer park. (It was later re-released as Heroes of the Heart.) Groce also co-wrote the title song with Webb Wilder, who also appeared in the film with country musicians Porter Wagoner and Johnny Paycheck. Groce co-wrote a musical theatre version.

Groce owned The Morgantown School of Ballet from 1980 to 1985. He was part owner of West Virginia's only statewide arts and entertainment alternative tabloid, Graffiti, from 1990 until 2004. In 2005, he became executive director of FestivALL Charleston, a ten-day festival of music, dance, theater and visual arts in Charleston, the capital of West Virginia.

=== Personal life ===
Larry Groce lives in Charleston, having moved there in 1972. He is married to Sandra Groce (née Armstrong), a classically trained violist. They have two daughters.

== See also ==
- List of 1970s one-hit wonders in the United States
