= 1990 in literature =

This article contains information about the literary events and publications of 1990.

== Events ==
- March 20 – Stephen Blumberg is arrested for stealing more than 23,600 books in North America.
- March 28 – An adaptation of Anton Chekhov's play Three Sisters opens at the Gate Theatre in Dublin with locally born Sinéad, Sorcha and Niamh Cusack in the title rôles and their father Cyril Cusack as Dr. Chebutykin.
- May 24 – Alicia Girón García is the first woman to become director of the Biblioteca Nacional de España.
- c. June – J. K. Rowling has the idea for Harry Potter while on a train from Manchester to London: "I was staring out the window, and the idea for Harry just came. He appeared in my mind's eye, very fully formed. The basic idea was for a boy who didn't know what he was." She begins writing Harry Potter and the Philosopher's Stone, which will be completed in 1995 and published in 1997.
- October – Nicci Gerrard marries Sean French in the London Borough of Hackney, to make up a writing team known as Nicci French.
- Uncertain date – Austrian writer Ernest Bornemann is awarded the first Magnus Hirschfeld Medal for sexual research.

== New books ==
=== Fiction ===
- Felipe Alfau – Chromos (completed 1948)
- Iain M. Banks – Use of Weapons
- Greg Bear – Heads and Queen of Angels
- Thomas Berger – Orrie's Story
- Louis de Bernières – The War of Don Emmanuel's Nether Parts
- William Boyd – Brazzaville Beach
- Ray Bradbury – A Graveyard for Lunatics
- John Bradshaw – Homecoming
- A.S. Byatt – Possession (1990 Booker Prize winner)
- Tom Clancy – Clear and Present Danger
- Hugh Cook – The Wazir and the Witch and The Wishstone and the Wonderworkers
- Bernard Cornwell – Sharpe's Waterloo and Crackdown
- Michael Crichton – Jurassic Park
- Jim Dodge – Stone Junction
- Roddy Doyle – The Snapper
- Dominick Dunne – An Inconvenient Woman
- James Ellroy – L.A. Confidential
- Neil Gaiman – The Sandman: The Doll's House (graphic novel; volume 2 of The Sandman series)
- Neil Gaiman and Terry Pratchett – Good Omens
- John Kenneth Galbraith – A Tenured Professor
- John Gardner – Brokenclaw
- Elizabeth George – Well-Schooled in Murder
- Andrew Greeley – The Cardinal Virtues
- Peter Høeg – Tales of the Night (Fortællinger om Natten)
- Elizabeth Jane Howard – The Light Years (first of the Cazalet series)
- Robert E. Howard, L. Sprague de Camp and Lin Carter – The Conan Chronicles 2
- Marsha Hunt – Joy
- Monica Hughes – Invitation to the Game
- P. D. James – Devices and Desires
- Charles Johnson – Middle Passage (1990 National Book Award for Fiction)
- Robert Jordan – The Eye of the World
- Jamaica Kincaid – Lucy
- Stephen King – Four Past Midnight and The Stand ("The Complete & Uncut Edition")
- Hanif Kureishi – The Buddha of Suburbia
- Joe R Lansdale – Savage Season
- Elmore Leonard – Get Shorty
- Robert Ludlum – The Bourne Ultimatum
- Ian McEwan – The Innocent
- Patrick McGrath – Spider
- Alan Moore and David Lloyd – V for Vendetta (graphic novel)
- Brian Moore – Lies of Silence
- Alice Munro – Friend of My Youth (short stories)
- Tim O'Brien – The Things They Carried
- Orhan Pamuk – The Black Book
- Robert B. Parker – Stardust
- Rosamund Pilcher – September
- Belva Plain – Harvest
- Terry Pratchett – Eric and Moving Pictures
- Thomas Pynchon – Vineland
- W. G. Sebald – Vertigo (Schwindel. Gefühle)
- Lucius Shepard – The Ends of the Earth
- Danielle Steel – Message From Nam
- James Tiptree, Jr. – Her Smoke Rose Up Forever
- Christopher Tolkien (with J. R. R. Tolkien (d. 1973) and Alan Lee (illustrator)) – The War of the Ring (The History of The Lord of the Rings vol. 3; The History of Middle-earth vol. 8)
- Scott Turow – The Burden of Proof
- John Updike – Rabbit at Rest (1990 National Book Critics Circle Award for Fiction; 1991 Pulitzer Prize for Fiction)
- Andrew Vachss – Blossom
- Kurt Vonnegut – Hocus Pocus
- Harry L. Watson – Liberty and Power
- John Edgar Wideman – Philadelphia Fire (1991 PEN/Faulkner Award for Fiction)
- Banana Yoshimoto – Amrita

=== Children and young people ===
- Chris Van Allsburg – Just a Dream
- Avi – The True Confessions of Charlotte Doyle
- Lucy Cousins – Maisy Goes for a Swim (first in the Maisy Mouse series)
- Gillian Cross – Wolf
- Lynley Dodd – Slinky Malinki
- Rumer Godden – Fu-Dog
- Sonia Holleyman – Mona the Vampire (book)
- Ken Kesey – Little Tricker the Squirrel Meets Big Double the Bear
- Jean Marzollo – Pretend You're a Cat
- Terenci Moix – Los Grandes Mitos del Cine (The Greatest Stories of Hollywood Cinema)
- Inga Moore – Six-Dinner Sid
- Jim Murphy – The Boys' War: Confederate and Union soldiers talk about the Civil War
- Bill Peet – Cock-a-doodle Dudley
- Daniel Pinkwater – Borgel
- Salman Rushdie – Haroun and the Sea of Stories
- Dr. Seuss – Oh, the Places You'll Go
- Diane Stanley – Good Queen Bess: The Story of Elizabeth I of England
- William Steig – Shrek!
- Jacqueline Wilson – Glubbslyme (fantasy novel)

=== Drama ===
- Brian Friel – Dancing at Lughnasa
- Declan Hughes – I Can't Get Started
- John Guare – Six Degrees of Separation
- Girish Karnad – Taledanda (Kannada: ತಲೆದಂಡ, Death by Beheading)
- Peter Shaffer – Lettice and Lovage

=== Poetry ===
- Derek Walcott – Omeros

=== Non-fiction ===
- Douglas Adams and Mark Carwardine – Last Chance to See
- Bill Bryson – The Mother Tongue: English and How It Got That Way
- Judith Butler – Gender Trouble
- Orson Scott Card – How to Write Science Fiction and Fantasy
- Cheikh Anta Diop – Alerte sous les tropiques: articles 1946–1960: culture et développement en Afrique noire (translated as Towards the African Renaissance: essays in African culture & development, 1946–1960)
- Dougal Dixon – Man After Man: An Anthropology of the Future
- Lawrence Durrell – Caesar's Vast Ghost: Aspects of Provence
- Ryszard Kapuscinski – The Soccer War
- Pierre Lévêque – The Birth of Greece
- Michael Lynch – Scotland: A New History
- Susan Mayse – Ginger: The Life and Death of Albert Goodwin
- James A. Michener – Pilgrimage
- Raphael Patai – The Hebrew Goddess
- Ronald Reagan – An American Life
- Arun Shourie and Sita Ram Goel – Hindu Temples: What Happened to Them
- Barry Siegel – A Death in White Bear Lake
- Gary Snyder – The Practice of the Wild
- Hans-Jürgen Syberberg – On the Fortunes and Misfortunes of Art in Post-War Germany (Vom Unglück und Glück der Kunst in Deutschland nach dem letzten Kriege)

== Births ==
- March 29 – Kiran Millwood Hargrave, English poet, playwright and novelist
- June 20 – Mohamed Mbougar Sarr, Senegalese francophone fiction writer
- July 27 – Victoria Aveyard, American young-adult novelist

== Deaths ==
- January 24 – Leon Kalustian, Romanian journalist, essayist and memoirist (born 1908)
- February 27 – Alexandru Rosetti, Romanian linguist, editor and memoirist (burns, born 1895)
- March 12 – Rosamond Lehmann, English novelist (born 1901)
- May 4 – John Ormond, Welsh poet (born 1923)
- May 10 – Walker Percy, American novelist (born 1916)
- May 25 – Lucy M. Boston, English children's novelist (born 1892)
- July 15 – Zaim Topčić, Yugoslav and Bosnian writer (born 1920)
- July 22 – Manuel Puig, Argentine novelist (heart attack, born 1932)
- August 1 – Michael Glenny, British translator of Russian literature into English (born 1927)
- August 17 – Roderick Cook, English playwright (born 1932)
- August 25 – Morley Callaghan, Canadian novelist, playwright and broadcasting personality (born 1903)
- September 8 – Denys Watkins-Pitchford, English children's writer (born 1905)
- September 26 – Alberto Moravia, Italian novelist and journalist (born 1907)
- September 27 – Ion Biberi, Romanian social scientist, novelist and essayist (born 1904)
- September 30 – Patrick White, Australian novelist (born 1912)
- October 23 – Louis Althusser, French Marxist philosopher (heart attack, born 1918)
- November 7 – Lawrence Durrell, English novelist, dramatist and travel writer (born 1912)
- November 8 – Anya Seton, American genre novelist (born 1904)
- November 23 – Roald Dahl, Welsh-born children's author (myelodysplastic syndrome, born 1916)
- November 24 – Dodie Smith, English novelist and dramatist (born 1899)
- November 29 – Clare H Abrahall, English biographer and children's writer (born 1900)
- December 1 – Irma Chilton, Welsh children's writer in Welsh and English (born 1930)
- December 7 – Reinaldo Arenas, Cuban poet, novelist and playwright (suicide, born 1943)
- December 11 – David Turner, English dramatist (born 1927)
- December 14 – Friedrich Dürrenmatt, Swiss dramatist (congestive heart failure, born 1921)
- December 16 - Stanley Green, American theatre and film historian and writer (born 1923)
- December 20 – Andrea Dunbar, English playwright (born 1961)
- December 24 – Gwyn Williams, Welsh poet and novelist (born 1904)

== Awards ==
- Nobel Prize for Literature: Octavio Paz
- Europe Theatre Prize: Giorgio Strehler
- Camões Prize: João Cabral de Melo Neto

=== Australia ===
- The Australian/Vogel Literary Award: Gillian Mears, The Mint Lawn
- C. J. Dennis Prize for Poetry: Robert Adamson, The Clean Dark
- Kenneth Slessor Prize for Poetry: Robert Adamson, The Clean Dark
- Mary Gilmore Prize: Kristopher Rassemussen, In the Name of the Father
- Miles Franklin Award: Tom Flood, Oceana Fine

=== Canada ===
- See 1990 Governor General's Awards for a complete list of winners and finalists for those awards.

=== France ===
- Prix Goncourt: Jean Rouaud, Les Champs d'honneur
- Prix Décembre: François Maspero, Les Passagers du Roissy–Express
- Prix Médicis French: Les Quartiers d'hiver – Jean-Noël Pancrazi
- Prix Médicis International: Amitav Ghosh, Les Feux du Bengale

=== United Kingdom ===
- Booker Prize: A. S. Byatt, Possession: A Romance
- Carnegie Medal for children's literature: Gillian Cross, Wolf
- Cholmondeley Award: Kingsley Amis, Elaine Feinstein, Michael O'Neill
- Eric Gregory Award: Nicholas Drake, Maggie Hannan, William Park, Jonathan Davidson, Lavinia Greenlaw, Don Paterson, John Wells
- James Tait Black Memorial Prize for fiction: William Boyd, Brazzaville Beach
- James Tait Black Memorial Prize for biography: Claire Tomalin, The Invisible Woman: The Story of Nelly Ternan and Charles Dickens
- Queen's Gold Medal for Poetry: Sorley Maclean
- Whitbread Best Book Award: Nicholas Mosley, Hopeful Monsters
- The Sunday Express Book of the Year: J. M. Coetzee, Age of Iron

=== United States ===
- Agnes Lynch Starrett Poetry Prize: Debra Allbery, Walking Distance
- Aiken Taylor Award for Modern American Poetry: W. S. Merwin
- Bernard F. Connors Prize for Poetry: Christopher Logue, Kings
- Bobbitt National Prize for Poetry: James Merrill, The Inner Room
- Caldecott Award: Ed Young, Lon Po Po: A Red–Riding Hood Story from China
- Compton Crook Award: Josepha Sherman, The Shining Falcon
- Frost Medal: Denise Levertov / James Laughlin
- Hugo Award for Best Novel: Dan Simmons for Hyperion
- National Book Award for Fiction: Charles Johnson for Middle Passage
- Nebula Award: Ursula K. Le Guin, Tehanu: The Last Book of Earthsea
- Newbery Medal for children's literature: Lois Lowry, Number the Stars
- Pulitzer Prize for Drama: August Wilson, The Piano Lesson
- Pulitzer Prize for Fiction: Oscar Hijuelos for The Mambo Kings Play Songs of Love
- Pulitzer Prize for Poetry: Charles Simic: The World Doesn't End
- Whiting Awards:

Fiction: Yannick Murphy, Lawrence Naumoff, Mark Richard, Christopher Tilghman, Stephen Wright
Nonfiction: Harriet Ritvo, Amy Wilentz
Plays: Tony Kushner
Poetry: Emily Hiestand, Dennis Nurkse

=== Elsewhere ===
- Friedenspreis des Deutschen Buchhandels: Karl Dedecius
- Premio Nadal, Juan José Millás, La soledad era esto
