= Giron =

Giron or Girón may refer to:

== People ==
Girón or Giron is a Spanish and French surname and refer to the following people:

- Alicia Girón García (1938-2020), Spanish librarian
- Charles Giron (1850-1914), Swiss painter
- Francisco Hernández Girón (died 1554), Peruvian conquistador and rebel
- Gabriel Girón (born 1988), Mexican basketball player
- José Antonio Girón (1911-1995), Falangist politician
- Marcos Giron (born 1993), American tennis player
- Pedro Girón (disambiguation), several people with this name
- Socorro Girón (1919-2004), Puerto Rican historian

== Places ==
- Giron, France
- Girón, Santander, a town in Colombia
- Playa Girón, location of the failed 1961 Bay of Pigs Invasion
- Girón, Azuay, a town and canton in Ecuador
- Kiruna (Giron in Northern Sámi), northernmost city in Sweden

== Others ==
- Girón (newspaper), official organ of the Communist Party provincial committee in Matanzas, Cuba
- Girón Formation, a geological formation in the Andes
