= Still I Rise =

Still I Rise may refer to:

- "Still I Rise," a poem by Maya Angelou, first published in her similarly titled 1978 book of poetry, And Still I Rise
- Still I Rise: A Cartoon History of African Americans, a 1997 book coauthored by Roland Owen Laird Jr. and Taneshia Nash Laird
  - Still I Rise: A Graphic History of African Americans, a 2009 update of the 1997 book
- Still I Rise (album), a 1999 album by 2Pac and the Outlawz
- "Still I Rise", a song by Yolanda Adams from the 1998 album Songs from the Heart
- "Still I Rise", a song by Shadows Fall from the 2009 album Retribution
- "Still I Rise" (Supergirl), an episode of Supergirl
