= Local Government (Scotland) Act 1929 =

Act of the Parliament of the United Kingdom

Local Government (Scotland) Act 1929 (Note: Section 80(1).)
- Act of Parliament
- Parliament of the United Kingdom
- Long title: An Act to transfer to county councils and to the town councils of certain burghs in Scotland functions of existing local authorities relating to poor relief, lunacy and mental deficiency, education, public health, and other matters; to amend the law relating to local government in Scotland; to extend the application of the Rating and Valuation (Apportionment) Act, 1928, to lands and heritages in which no persons are employed, to net and cruive salmon fishings and to minerals let but unworked; to grant relief from rates in the case of the lands and heritages in Scotland to which that Act applies; to discontinue grants from the Exchequer for certain purposes in Scotland and to provide other grants in lieu thereof; and for purposes consequential on the matters aforesaid.
- Citation: 19 & 20 Geo. 5. c. 25
- Territorial extent: United Kingdom

Dates
- Royal assent: 10 May 1929
- Commencement: 16 May 1930 (Note: Section 80(2).)
Other legislation
Amends	Education (Scotland) Act 1918
Repeals/revokes	Commissioners of Supply (Scotland) Act 1856; Commissioners of Supply (Scotland) Act 1857; Education and Local Taxation Account (Scotland) Act 1892; Agricultural Rates Congested Districts and Burgh Land Tax Relief (Scotland) Act 1896; Parish Councils Casual Vacancies (Scotland) Act 1897; Local Taxation Account (Scotland) Act 1898
Amended by	Local Government (Scotland) Act 1947; Local Government Act 1948; National Assistance Act 1948; Agricultural Holdings (Scotland) Act 1949; Diseases of Animals Act 1950; Income Tax Act 1952; Police (Scotland) Act 1956; Food and Drugs (Scotland) Act 1956; Mental Health (Scotland) Act 1960; Local Government (Scotland) Act 1966; Local Government (Scotland) Act 1973; Statute Law (Repeals) Act 1986
Relates to	Local Government Act 1929

Status: Partially repealed

Text of statute as originally enacted

Revised text of statute as amended

Text of the Local Government (Scotland) Act 1929 as in force today (including any amendments) within the United Kingdom, from legislation.gov.uk.

The Local Government (Scotland) Act 1929 (19 & 20 Geo. 5. c. 25) is an act of the Parliament of the United Kingdom that reorganised local government in Scotland from 1930, introducing joint county councils, large and small burghs and district councils. The Act also abolished the Scottish poor law system with institutions passing to the local authorities.

The act was drafted by Walter Elliot, the Unionist (Conservative) politician who became later (1936) Secretary of State for Scotland.

== Parish councils and poor law ==
The parish councils that had been introduced by the Local Government (Scotland) Act 1894 (57 & 58 Vict. c. 58) were dissolved. Their responsibilities regarding poor law passed to the county council, other powers passing to the new district councils.

Another major effect of the Act was the ending of the Poor Law system, which had largely been administered by the parish councils. Their responsibilities in this area – now known as "Public Assistance" – passed to the county councils, large burghs and counties of cities.

== Abolition of Commissioners of Supply ==
Commissioners of Supply had been established for each county in 1667, but had lost most of their powers to the county councils formed in 1890 under the Local Government (Scotland) Act 1889 52 & 53 Vict. c. 50). The commissioners' remaining powers were to form part of a standing joint committee which acted as the police authority for the county. The 1929 Act dissolved the standing committees and the commissioners ceased to exist.

The county and city education authorities that had been formed in 1919 were also abolished, with their functions and powers passing to the counties and counties of cities.

== Changes to burghs ==
The county councils created in 1890 had not had authority over some burghs. Those burghs whose population had been 7,000 or more in the 1881 census and which either ran their own police force or were royal burghs which returned or contributed towards a member of parliament had been independent from the county councils.

=== Large burghs and small burghs ===
The 1929 Act brought all burghs under the control of a county council, except for the four burghs which were counties of cities (being Aberdeen, Dundee, Edinburgh, and Glasgow). The burghs were categorised as either being a "large burgh" (generally those with a population of 20,000 or more) or a "small burgh". The large burghs retained substantial powers of self-government. The small burghs ceded many of their powers to the county council.

Councillors were directly elected for the landward part of each county (the area outside any burghs), whilst councillors for the burghs were co-opted by the town councils. A councillor co-opted for a burgh was not allowed to vote on matters relating to functions that the county council did not provide in that burgh.

The Act did not contain a list of large and small burghs. They were eventually listed in the schedule to the Local Government (Scotland) Act 1947.

=== United burghs ===
The Act united a number of adjacent burghs under a single town council (listed in Schedule 2):

- Kilrenny, Anstruther Easter and Anstruther Wester
- Elie, Liberty & Williamsburgh and Earlsferry
- Bonnyrigg and Lasswade
- Blairgowrie and Rattray
- Kirkcaldy and Dysart

Where any of the merging towns was a royal burgh this status was to be continued in the united burgh. The four royal burghs that were counties of cities were largely unaffected by the Act, except that they assumed responsibility for public assistance and education.

== Changes to county councils ==
For most local government purposes the counties of Kinross and Perth, and of Nairn and Moray were to be combined. The counties were to continue to exist, with individual county councils being elected, but they were to form a joint county council. The joint council was, however, permitted to delegate functions to either of the individual county councils.

With the redistribution of powers between counties, large burghs and small burghs, the method of electing the county council was changed. The council was to be partly directly elected and partly chosen by the town councils of large burghs. Each large burgh was to nominate one (or more depending on population) members of the town council to the county council. The rest of the county was divided into electoral divisions (consisting of landward parishes) and small burghs, each returning single members. The first elections to the reconstituted county councils took place in November and December 1929.

== District councils ==
The reconstituted county councils were obliged to submit a district council scheme to the Secretary of State for Scotland by 1 February 1930, dividing the landward part of the county into districts. The original bill had not included district councils, with the county council assuming all powers outside burghs. The intermediate level of administration was introduced following backbench pressure.

Each district was to consist of one or more electoral divisions used for electing county councillors. The scheme specified the number of elected councillors. The county councillors elected for the division were to be ex officio members of the district council. The first elections of district councillors took place on 8 April 1930.

It was not required for districts to be formed in Kinross-shire and Nairnshire unless the joint county council so directed. In the event, a district council was formed for the landward part of Nairnshire, but Kinross-shire county council performed the functions of a district council.

== Services provided by the councils ==
Following the reorganisations of 1929 and 1930 the different tiers of Scottish local government were responsible for the following major services:

Type of local authority	Services
County of city	Police, Education, public health, public assistance, housing, lighting, drainage
County council	Police, education, public health, (Note: Outside large burghs) public assistance
Large burgh	Police, (Note: Where the burgh had a population of 50,000 or more, or had a separate police force in existence.) public health, public Assistance, housing, lighting, drainage
Small burgh	Housing, lighting, drainage
District council	Housing, lighting, drainage

== See also ==
- List of local government areas in Scotland 1930–75

== Bibliography ==
- Local Government (Scotland) Act 1929 (19 & 20 Geo.5 c.25)
- Michael Lynch, Scotland: A New History, Pimlico 1993, pp. 435 and 436.
