= The Jaguar Hunter =

1987 collection of short stories by Lucius Shepard

- Dust-jacket illustration by Jeffrey K. Potter
- Author: Lucius Shepard
- Illustrator: Jeffrey K. Potter
- Cover artist: Jeffrey K. Potter
- Language: English
- Genre: Science fiction, fantasy, horror
- Publisher: Arkham House
- Publication date: May 1987
- Publication place: United States
- Media type: Print (hardback)
- Pages: xii, 404
- ISBN: 0-87054-154-4
- OCLC: 14212330
- Dewey Decimal: 813/.54 19
- LC Class: PS3569.H3939 J3 1987

The Jaguar Hunter is a collection of science fiction, fantasy and horror stories by American author Lucius Shepard. Illustrated by J. K. Potter, it was released in May 1987 and was the author's first book published by Arkham House. It was originally published in an edition of 3,194 copies, with a second printing later in 1987 of 1,508 copies. Bantam Books issued a trade paperback edition in 1989, and Four Walls Eight Windows reprinted the collection in 2001. The first British publication came as a Paladin Books trade paperback in 1988, followed quickly by a Kerosina Books hardcover. A Rumanian translation appeared in 2008.

The Jaguar Hunter won the 1988 World Fantasy Award for best collection, as well as the Locus Award in the same category. Five of the stories were nominated for the Nebula Award, one winning the award; three of those were also nominated for the Hugo Award; and one nominated, for the Hugo, Nebula, and World Fantasy Awards. Ten of the eleven stories placed in the annual Locus polls, eight reached the top ten, and two won Locus Awards.

== Contents ==
- Foreword (Michael Bishop)
- "The Jaguar Hunter" (F&SF 1985)
- "The Night of White Bhairab" (F&SF 1984)
- "Salvador" (F&SF 1984)
- "How the Wind Spoke at Madaket" (Isaac Asimov's Science Fiction Magazine 1985)
- "Black Coral" (Universe 14, 1984)
- "R & R" (Isaac Asimov's Science Fiction Magazine 1986)
- "The End of Life as We Know It" (Isaac Asimov's Science Fiction Magazine 1985)
- "A Traveler's Tale" (Isaac Asimov's Science Fiction Magazine 1984)
- "Mengele" (Universe 14, 1984)
- "The Man Who Painted the Dragon Griaule" (F&SF 1984)
- "A Spanish Lesson" (F&SF 1985)

The precise contents of this collection vary from edition to edition. The Bantam reprint omits "R & R". The Paladin and Kerosina editions omit "R & R" and add three additional stories. The 2001 reissue adds one story to those found in the original edition.

== Reception ==
Orson Scott Card gave the collection a highly favorable review, declaring that "Shepard is the best new short-fiction writer of the eighties" and "is capable of dazzling brilliance."

Neil Barron described The Jaguar Hunter as "One of the finest collections of fantasy and science fiction published in the 1980s."

== Sources ==
- Jaffery, Sheldon (1989). The Arkham House Companion. Mercer Island, WA: Starmont House, Inc. pp. 140–141. ISBN 1-55742-005-X.
- Chalker, Jack L.; Mark Owings (1998). The Science-Fantasy Publishers: A Bibliographic History, 1923-1998. Westminster, MD and Baltimore: Mirage Press, Ltd. p. 56.
- Joshi, S.T. (1999). Sixty Years of Arkham House: A History and Bibliography. Sauk City, WI: Arkham House. pp. 156–157. ISBN 0-87054-176-5.
- Nielsen, Leon (2004). Arkham House Books: A Collector's Guide. Jefferson, NC and London: McFarland & Company, Inc. p. 132. ISBN 0-7864-1785-4.
