= Life During Wartime =

Life During Wartime may refer to:

== Music ==
- "Life During Wartime" (song), a song by Talking Heads first released in 1979 from their album Fear of Music
- "Life During Wartime", a song by Pinhead Gunpowder from their 1997 album Goodbye Ellston Avenue

== Film and television ==
- The Alarmist, a 1997 film also known by the alternate title of the Keith Reddin play Life During Wartime upon which it was based
- Life During Wartime (Grey's Anatomy), an episode of Grey's Anatomy aired in 2008
- Life During Wartime (film), a 2009 film from director Todd Solondz

== Literature and drama ==
- Life During Wartime (novel), a 1987 science fantasy novel by Lucius Shepard
- Life During Wartime (play), a play written in 1991 by Keith Reddin
- Life During Wartime (anthology), a 2003 collection of short stories by various authors about Bernice Summerfield, a character in the Doctor Who franchise
