= Daniel Faivre =

Historian of religions

- Born: 11 March 1952
- Education: Doctor of Philosophy
- Alma mater: Marie and Louis Pasteur University
- Occupation: Production designer
- Employer: Centre universitaire catholique de Bourgogne; University of Neuchâtel
- Position held: directeur de recherche (2014–), research associate

Daniel Faivre (born in 1952) is a French historian of religions, professor at the CNRS Ancient History Research Center, at the University of Franche-Comté and director of research at the Centre Universitaire Catholique de Bourgogne.

== Life ==
=== Education ===
From 1991 Faivre holds a doctorate in ancient history and civilization at the University of Besançon with the tesis De l'errance à l'espérance : genèse d'une religion under the tutelage of Pierre Lévêque.

=== Academic work ===
Daniel Faivre teaches history at a secondary school in Besançon, and also holds a research post at the Centre Universitaire Catholique de Bourgogne, founded in Dijon in 1993 in conjunction with the Catholic University of Lyon, which provides training in religious history and the teaching of religion. From 1996, Faivre is a lecturer of the Faculty of Theology at University of Neuchâtel. He also is a researcher at the Institut de Formation pour l'Étude et l'Enseignement des Religions in Dijon, France.

== Works ==
=== Thesis ===
- Faivre, Danel (1991). De l'errance à l'espérance: genèse d'une religion (PhD diss. University of Besançon).

=== Books ===
- Faivre, Daniel (1996). L'idée de Dieu chez les Hébreux nomades: Une monolâtrie sur fond de polydémonisme. Editions L'Harmattan. ISBN 9782296331112.
- —————— (1998). Vivre et mourir dans l'ancien Israël. Paris: Éditions L'Harmattan.
- —————— (2000). Daniel Faivre, Précis d'anthropologie biblique. Images de l'homme. Histoire et perspectives méditerranéennes. Paris: L'Harmattan. ISBN 2-7384-9151-0.
- —————— (2001). L'enfer à sa porte. Nice: Éditions Feel. ISBN 2913197450.
- —————— (2004). Rouge du sang des mères. La Belle Étoile, Éditions Empreinte.
- —————— (2006). Le Messie d'or, Saint-Germain-en-Laye. Éditions In octavo.
- —————— (2007). Mythes de la Genèse, genèse des mythes. Religions et Spiritualité. Paris: L'Harmattan. ISBN 9782296174580.
- —————— (2007). Tissu, voile et vêtement. Religions et spiritualité. Editions L'Harmattan. ISBN 9782336263533.
- —————— (2008). Le Meilleur Ami De L'homme. ISBN 978-2-296-06120-0.
- —————— (2010). De Proche En Proche. ISBN 978-2-296-12510-0.
- —————— (2012). La Première Femme. ISBN 978-2-336-00197-5.
- —————— (2013). La mort en questions. Approches anthropologiques de la mort et du mourir. Espace éthique - Poche. Toulouse: Érès. doi:10.3917/eres.faivr.2013.01. ISBN 9782749236469.
- ——————; Hirsch, Emmanuel; Zucman, Élisabeth (2015). La personne polyhandicapée : éthique et engagements au quotidien. Érès Poche - Société - Espace Éthique. Érès. ISBN 9782749246826.
- —————— (2018). Religion et Violence. Regards croisés sur une dualité problématique. Editions L'Harmattan. ISBN 978-2-343-14067-4.

=== Articles ===
- Faivre, Daniel (1995). "Les représentations primitives du monde des morts chez les Hébreux". Dialogues d'histoire ancienne. 21 (1): 59–80. doi:10.3406/dha.1995.2216.
