= André Aymard =

French historian (1900–1964)

- Born: May 14, 1900; Saint-Denis, France
- Died: August 11, 1964 (aged 64); Oradour-sur-Glane, France
- Occupation: Historian

André Aymard (14 May 1900 – 11 August 1964) was a French historian specialising in Ancient Greece, particularly the Hellenistic period.

== Biography ==
=== Education ===
André Aymard first passed the agrégation in history and geography in 1923. The next year he joined the Foundation Thiers. Under the influence of Maurice Holleaux, he decided, after some hesitation, to focus his research on Ancient Greece.

In 1937, after he had taught at Strasbourg, Paris and Toulouse, he submitted his doctoral thesis on Les Assemblées de la Confédération achaienne (The Assemblies of the Achaean League).

=== University Career ===
He was a professor at the Sorbonne from 1942 to 1964, rising to become head of the faculty of arts. In 1955, he became a professor at the École pratique des hautes études.

A friend of Fernand Braudel, director of the 6th section de l'EPHE, he supervised Pierre Lévêque's doctoral thesis. He also taught Pierre Vidal-Naquet.

== Publications ==
- Les Assemblées de la Confédération achaienne (The Assemblies of the Achaean League), principal thesis, 1938, université de Paris, Bordeaux, Féret, 1938 (republished: 1967)
- Les Premiers rapports de Rome et de la Confédération achaïenne (198-189 av. JC) (The First Interactions of Rome and the Achaian League (198-189 BC), supplementary thesis, Bordeaux, Féret, 1938
- Le Royaume de Macédoine de la mort d'Alexandre à sa disparition (The Kingdom of Macedonia from the Death of Alexander to its dissolution), 1950
- Le Monde grec au temps de Philippe II de Macédoine et d'Alexandre le Grand (The Greek World in the Time of Philip II of Macedon & Alexander the Great), 1962
- Histoire générale des civilisations Tome 1. L'Orient et la Grèce antique (General History of Civilisations, Volume I. The East & Ancient Greece) with Jeannine Auboyer, 1963

== Sources ==
- Fernand Braudel, « Nécrologie d'André Aymard », Annales ESC, 1965, p. 641-642.
- Martine François, « Aymard André », on the website of the CTHS
