= Still I Rise: A Graphic History of African Americans =

- Author: Roland Laird and Taneshia Nash Laird, foreword by Charles R. Johnson
- Illustrator: Elihu "Adofo" Bey
- Language: English
- Publisher: Sterling
- Publication date: February 2009
- Publication place: United States
- Media type: Paperback
- Pages: 240
- ISBN: 978-1-4027-6226-0
- OCLC: 237325072
- Dewey Decimal: 973/.0496073 22
- LC Class: E185 .L35 2009
- Preceded by: Still I Rise: A Cartoon History of African Americans

Still I Rise: A Graphic History of African Americans is a pictorial and historical-cultural narrative chronicling the struggles and triumphs of African Americans. The book was published by Sterling Publishing in February 2009. Co-authored by husband and wife team Roland Laird and Taneshia Nash Laird, with a foreword by Charles R. Johnson, it is an update of the original text, Still I Rise: A Cartoon History of African Americans. Published in 1997, A Cartoon History depicts through the use of cartoon illustrations the historical journey of African Americans, from pre-colonial America to the present.

According to Charles Johnson, a National Book Award winner, Still I Rise is the first history of African Americans that is primarily of a cartoon or graphic nature. The book has been compared to cartoonist styles of Art Spiegelman and Larry Gonick applied to African American history. Johnson said of the first edition, "Permeating this encyclopedic research is ... recognition of the beauty, resilience, and spiritual endurance of black Americans."

The previous edition of A Graphic History is Still I Rise: A Cartoon History of African Americans. A Cartoon History spans the history of African peoples in America between the time periods of 1618, when the first skilled African craftspeople and farmers were brought over as indentured servants, to the Million Man March of 1995. The book treats at some length topics such as militancy, separatism and integration. Throughout the story, the narrative highlights the efforts of diverse African American leaders including Harriet Tubman, Frederick Douglass and Martin Luther King. As an historical narrative, Still I Rise shows how Black Americans have persevered despite political, social and economic opposition.

== Summary ==
The book's plot centers around the fact that many African indentured servants, once in America, proved to be highly skilled - even more so than many of their European counterparts. The book tells the tale of how these servants went on to buy out their indenture contracts, creating a white backlash which resulted in lengthening those contracts. As tensions between Africans and Europeans grew, this ultimately led in 1676 to the Bacon's Rebellion, which caused slavery to become official law in all the colonies. The book then takes the reader from the end of American slavery, through Reconstruction and the Civil Rights Movement to the nomination of President Barack Obama. The central theme that is woven throughout the narrative is the resilience, creativity and fortitude of African Americans through virtually insurmountable obstacles.

== Reviews ==
Entertainment Weekly lauded the original 1997 text with the grade of "A−", praising it as "packed with information" and "engaging and well-written."

In the Trenton Times, the current edition is called "a labor of love" of "epic scope".

== Commissioning the Second Edition ==
The 2007 candidacy of then Senator Barack Obama prompted Sterling Publishing, a New York-based publishing company, to ask the authors to create a new edition.

== Criticism ==
Although Draper offers positive comments on the Still I Rise editions, she criticized the first edition, arguing that "the illustrations are flat...," and that "characters vary grotesquely from panel to panel..."

Publishers Weekly said that, while the book is worthy of reading, "...the entire book is marred with amateurish artwork. Artist Bey displays only the most rudimentary of basic visual storytelling techniques; the layouts are haphazard, with the figures' hands and heads often cut off, and the grafittiesque/cartoony art style is inappropriate for the material. It's disappointing that a historical work with the potential for crossover appeal gets poleaxed by subpar visuals that trivialize the text. Parts of the book bear so little visual gravitas that it comes off as a black man's struggle coloring book, and that's a shame."

A Library Journal review said the illustrations were "often simplistic."

== Editions ==
- 1997, Still I Rise: A Cartoon History of African Americans. 1st Edition. W. W. Norton & Company; Illustrated. edition (October 1997). ISBN 978-0-393-31751-0. (Hardcover| Audio CD| Paperback).
- 2009, Still I Rise: A Graphic History of African Americans. Sterling Publishing. ISBN 978-1-4027-6226-0. (Paperback).
