= Michelangelo (Stanley book) =

2000 book by Diane Stanley

- Author: Diane Stanley
- Illustrator: Diane Stanley
- Language: English
- Subject: Children's non-fiction literature, Biography, Renaissance art, Michelangelo
- Published: 2000 (HarperCollins)
- Publication place: US
- Media type: Print (hardback)
- Pages: 48 (unpaginated)
- ISBN: 9780688150853
- OCLC: 42733770

Michelangelo is a 2000 children's biography by Diane Stanley. It covers Michelangelo's life, from his childhood to his death.

== Reception ==
Reviews of Michelangelo include by Booklist that wrote "One of the most pleasing things about Stanley's books is the way her sturdy texts stand up to her strong artwork. That's particularly evident here .." and the School Library Journal that stated "she (Stanley) has crafted a picture-book biography that is as readable as it is useful." Kirkus Reviews in a star review wrote "she weaves all the major elements of Michelangelo’s long and astonishingly creative life into a compelling, anecdote-rich narrative .. This handsome, affordable, lavishly illustrated and wonderfully readable book has broad appeal." and Publishers Weekly called it a "panoramic telling of his life story", concluding "The dislocating effect (Stanley's use of digital art composition) blemishes an otherwise outstanding work."

The Horn Book Magazine review included "Stanley has indeed captured in both words and pictures the essence of Michelangelo, man of the Renaissance-sculptor, painter, architect."

== Awards and nominations ==
2001 Orbis Pictus Honor Book
2001 Notable Social Studies Trade Books For Young People
