= Green Eyes (novel) =

1984 novel by Lucius Shepard

Green Eyes is a novel by Lucius Shepard published in 1984.

== Plot ==
Green Eyes is a novel in which modified bacteria bring newly dead people back to life but consume their brains.

== Reception ==
Dave Langford reviewed Green Eyes for White Dwarf #93, and stated that "It's a richly strange, decaying world that you see through those green eyes."

== Reviews ==
- Review by Faren Miller (1984) in Locus, #278 March 1984
- Review by Don D'Ammassa (1984) in Science Fiction Chronicle, #57 June 1984
- Review by Algis Budrys (1984) in The Magazine of Fantasy & Science Fiction, July 1984
- Review by Fredrica K. Bartz (1984) in Fantasy Review, September 1984
- Review by Frank Catalano (1984) in Amazing Stories, November 1984
- Review by Tom Easton (1984) in Analog Science Fiction/Science Fact, November 1984
- Review by Norman Spinrad (1984) in Isaac Asimov's Science Fiction Magazine, December 1984
- Review by C. J. Henderson (1984) in Whispers #21-22, December 1984
- Review by Colin Greenland (1985) in Foundation, #33 Spring 1985
- Review by Chris Bailey (1986) in Vector 134
- Review by Don D'Ammassa (1998) in Science Fiction Chronicle, #198 July–August 1998
- Review by John Newsinger (1998) in Vector 201
- Review by Graham Sleight (2009) in Locus, #577 February 2009
