= Pedro Girón =

Pedro Girón may refer to:

- Pedro Girón, 1st Lord of Osuna (1423–1466), known as Pedro Girón Acuña Pacheco
- Pedro Téllez-Girón, 3rd Count of Ureña (died 1531)
- Pedro Téllez-Girón, 1st Duke of Osuna (1537–1590)
- Pedro Téllez-Girón, 3rd Duke of Osuna (1574–1624)
- Pedro Téllez-Girón, 8th Duke of Osuna (1728–1787)
- Pedro Téllez-Girón, 9th Duke of Osuna (1755–1807)
- Pedro de Alcántara Álvarez de Toledo, 13th Duke of the Infantado (1768–1841)
- Pedro de Alcántara Téllez-Girón y Beaufort Spontin, 14th Duke of the Infantado (1810–1844)
- Pedro de Alcántara Téllez-Girón (1786–1851)
- Pedro Agustín Girón (1778–1842)
