= Life During Wartime (novel) =

1987 novel by Lucius Shepard

Life during Wartime is a science fantasy novel written by American author Lucius Shepard. His second novel, it was published by Bantam Books in 1987, in which year it was nominated for the Philip K Dick Award. In 1990, it won the Kurd-Laßwitz-Preis for Foreign Work.

== Plot summary ==
David Mingolla is an artillery specialist in the United States Army serving in a near-future Central American war (references are made to then-future "Afghanistan in '89" and a nuclear weapon that destroyed Tel Aviv). As his unit serves in "Free Occupied Guatemala", Mingolla goes on leave and meets a woman named Debora in a cantina. They gradually become lovers; however, as they get close to each other, Mingolla feels intense mental pain later identified as a psychic probing his mind.

Soon after this, Mingolla is recruited into the Psicorps, an elite group of psychics the United States has assembled to counter the Soviet Union's own. Debora, a veteran of the revolt that led to American intervention in the first place, is designated his target. On his way through Psicorps training to refine his mental abilities, Mingolla learns that this front of the ongoing Cold War, as well as the war itself, is a manipulation by two Panamanian families, the Madradonas and the Sotomayors, over three centuries to increase psychic potential in humanity as well as their own genetic diversity.

Mingolla and Debora meet and part several times before their meeting with the Madradonas and Sotomayors in Darién, Panama and become embroiled with the members of Mingolla's former squad in a firefight which culminates in the nuclear destruction of Panama City. David and Debora leave the city and their former friends and antagonists behind them, deciding that ultimately what matters is their love for one another, the only item that has not been blatantly manipulated.

The fictional work excerpted several times in the novel, Juan Pastorín's short story collection The Fictive Boarding House, gives clues to the nature of the novel and Mingolla's experiences himself in a type of foreshadowing. The lyrics of Prowler heard or sung or thought among members of Mingolla's unit which bookend Life during Wartime serve this function as well. As a nod to science fiction author Philip K. Dick's work, the text itself does not present a clear or objective account of what truly happened to Mingolla or what was hallucination on his part. (At one point on Mingolla's journey, an AI combining a downed Sikorsky helicopter and a long-range guided missile imparts "revelation" to him.) PsiCorps' intensive drug therapy to hone Mingolla's potential as well as the presence and use of "Sammy" (short for Samurai, an intense stimulant) and Frost, a super-addictive version of cocaine, make the third person point of view essential for this novel.
