= The Ends of the Earth (short story collection) =

1991 collection of science fiction and horror stories by Lucius Shepard

- Dust-jacket illustration by Jeffrey K. Potter.
- Author: Lucius Shepard
- Illustrator: Jeffrey K. Potter
- Cover artist: Jeffrey K. Potter
- Language: English
- Genre: Science fiction, horror
- Published: 1991 (Arkham House)
- Publication place: United States
- Media type: Print (hardback)
- Pages: x, 484
- ISBN: 0-87054-161-7
- OCLC: 21762304
- Dewey Decimal: 813/.54 20
- LC Class: PS3569.H3939 E5 1991

The Ends of the Earth is a collection of science fiction and horror stories by American writer Lucius Shepard. It was released in 1991 and was the author's second book published by Arkham House. It was published in an edition of 4,655 copies. The stories originally appeared in Isaac Asimov's Science Fiction Magazine, The Magazine of Fantasy and Science Fiction and other magazines.

== Contents ==
The Ends of the Earth contains the following stories:

- "The Ends of the Earth"
- "Delta Sly Honey"
- "Bound for Glory"
- "The Exercise of Faith"
- "Nomans Land"
- "Life of Buddha"
- "Shades"
- "Aymara"
- "A Wooden Tiger"
- "The Black Clay Boy"
- "Fire Zone Emerald"
- "On the Border"
- "The Scalehunter's Beautiful Daughter"
- "Surrender"

== Awards ==
- World Fantasy Award - 1992

== Sources ==
- Chalker, Jack L.; Mark Owings (1998). The Science-Fantasy Publishers: A Bibliographic History, 1923-1998. Westminster, MD and Baltimore: Mirage Press, Ltd. p. 58.
- Joshi, S.T. (1999). Sixty Years of Arkham House: A History and Bibliography. Sauk City, WI: Arkham House. p. 162. ISBN 0-87054-176-5.
- Nielsen, Leon (2004). Arkham House Books: A Collector's Guide. Jefferson, NC and London: McFarland & Company, Inc. p. 137. ISBN 0-7864-1785-4.
