= The Birth of Greece =

1990 book by Pierre Lévêque

- First French edition. Reconstruction of a statue of Athena at the Parthenon in Athens. Detail of Benoît-Édouard Loviot's drawing Parthenon, 1879–1881.
- Author: Pierre Lévêque
- Original title: La Naissance de la Grèce
- Translator: Anthony Zielonka
- Language: French
- Series: Découvertes Gallimard●Histoire (FR); Abrams Discoveries (US); New Horizons (UK)
- Release number: 86th in collection
- Subject: History of ancient Greece
- Genre: Nonfiction monograph
- Publisher: Éditions Gallimard (FR); Harry N. Abrams (US); Thames & Hudson (UK)
- Publication date: 26 September 1990
- Publication place: France
- English publication date: 1994
- Media type: Print (paperback)
- Pages: 176 pp
- ISBN: 978-2-0705-3110-3 (first edition)
- OCLC: 1248941847
- Preceded by: Nouvelle-Calédonie : Un paradis dans la tourmente
- Followed by: Ni empereur ni roi, chef d'orchestre

The Birth of Greece (UK title: Ancient Greece: Utopia and Reality; French: La Naissance de la Grèce : Des Rois aux Cités, lit. 'The Birth of Greece: From Kings to Cities [City-States]') is a 1990 illustrated monograph on the history of ancient Greece. Written by French historian Pierre Lévêque, and published by Éditions Gallimard as the 86th volume in the "Découvertes" collection.

== Synopsis ==
The Birth of Greece covers ancient Greek history from roughly 2000 BC to the conquest of Greece by Philip II of Macedon and his son Alexander the Great's empire. The book comprises three chapters: the first covers the Greek Bronze Age and the Minoan and Mycenaean civilisations; the second the archaic period; and the third the classical period, starting from the Greco-Persian wars and ending with Alexander the Great. This is followed by an appendix of "documents", made up of both extracts from ancient sources, and from other writings about ancient Greece.

== Contents ==
From left: UK and US editions.

Body text

- Opening: a succession of full-page illustrations showing Sir Arthur John Evans' reconstruction of the palace at Knossos, and the reconstruction of the palace of Nestor at Pylos by Piet de Jong (pp. 1–9)
- Chapter I: "A Sumptuous Age of Bronze" (pp. 13–45)
- Chapter II: "The Archaic Period: An Age of Simmering Creativity" (pp. 47–87)
- Chapter III: "The Classical Balance: Reality and Utopianism" (pp. 89–127)

Documents

1. The Exaltation of Beauty, the Greek Ideal: The Apollo Belvedere (pp. 130–131)
2. Religion in Ancient Athens (pp. 132–135)
3. Prayer on the Acropolis (pp. 136–139)
4. The Syllabic Scripts of the Bronze Age Palaces (pp. 140–141)
5. The Pantheon as Reflected in Mycenaean Tablets (pp. 142–143)
6. The Evolution of Attic Pottery (pp. 144–145)
7. Solon, Legislator and Poet (pp. 146–147)
8. Naucratis: A Greek Concession on Egyptian Soil (pp. 148–149)
9. Two Great Pre-Socratic Philosophers from the Beginning of the 5th Century ʙᴄ (pp. 150–153)
10. Democrats and Democratic Regimes of the 6th and 5th Centuries ʙᴄ (pp. 154–157)
11. An Opponent of Athenian Democracy: Pseudo-Xenophon, the "Old Oligarch" (pp. 158–159)
12. An Orgiastic Cult: Maenadism (pp. 160–163)
13. A Stirring Appeal for Patriotism (pp. 164–167)
- Chronology of Ancient Greece ([6000–323 ʙᴄ], p. 168)
- Further Reading (p. 169)
- List of Illustrations (pp. 170–173)
- Index (pp. 173–175)
- Photograph Credits/Text Credits (p. 175)

== Reception ==
In its book review section, the archaeology magazine Minerva gave a positive review to the book: "There can be no better livre de poche introduction to the many aspects of ancient Greece."

Peter Walcot's review for Greece & Rome felt that the pictures were wonderful, but the text he found disappointing: "[The book], like its predecessors in the 'New Horizons' series, is a translation from the French and, more importantly, most imaginatively illustrated and inexpensively priced. It is the text which I find disappointing: earlier titles had a particular theme whereas this volume just sketches the story of the Greeks and their achievement from Minoans to Macedonians. [...] Still, who is going to bother overmuch with the text when the pictures are so wonderful?"

The Belgian historian Didier Viviers wrote in the journal L’Antiquité classique: "The reading of this book is warmly recommended to students and to any Greek history lover, from the Bronze Age to the 4th century BC. Remarkable synthesis, which goes to the essential; here is finally, one would be tempted to write, a work of popularization which does not content itself with presenting a succession of historical facts. The reader discovers, with enormous intellectual satisfaction, a coherent thought, which makes us experience the birth of the city and highlights the fruitful originality of Greek society. This fruitfulness is emphasized not only by the text, which concludes with the debt of our system of thought to this ancient civilization, but also by the illustration, the side-by-side arrangement of Classical and Neoclassical artworks, as if to remind us also of Greece's place in the imagination of later centuries."

== See also ==
- Aegean civilization
- Minoan civilization
- Archaic Greece
- Classical Greece
- Mycenaean Greece
- Greek Dark Ages
- Classical antiquity
- Classical studies
