= Salvador (short story) =

- Short story by Lucius Shepard
- Country: United States
- Language: English
- Genre(s): Science fiction

Publication
- Published in: The Magazine of Fantasy & Science Fiction
- Publication type: Magazine
- Publication date: April 1984

"Salvador" is a science fiction short story by American writer Lucius Shepard. Originally published in The Magazine of Fantasy & Science Fiction in 1984, the following year it won the Locus Poll award for Best Short Story, the SF Chronicle award for Short Story and was nominated for the Hugo and Nebula awards for Best Short Story.

== Plot summary ==
The story follows Dantzler, a soldier in the Special Forces of the US Military. He and his platoon are in El Salvador looking for Sandinista patrols prior to an invasion of Nicaragua. The soldiers rely on ampules, drugs that help them stay calm and focus their rage, and discover that their increasing use of the drug make it difficult to distinguish between reality and hallucination.
