= Diane Stanley =

American children's book writer and illustrator

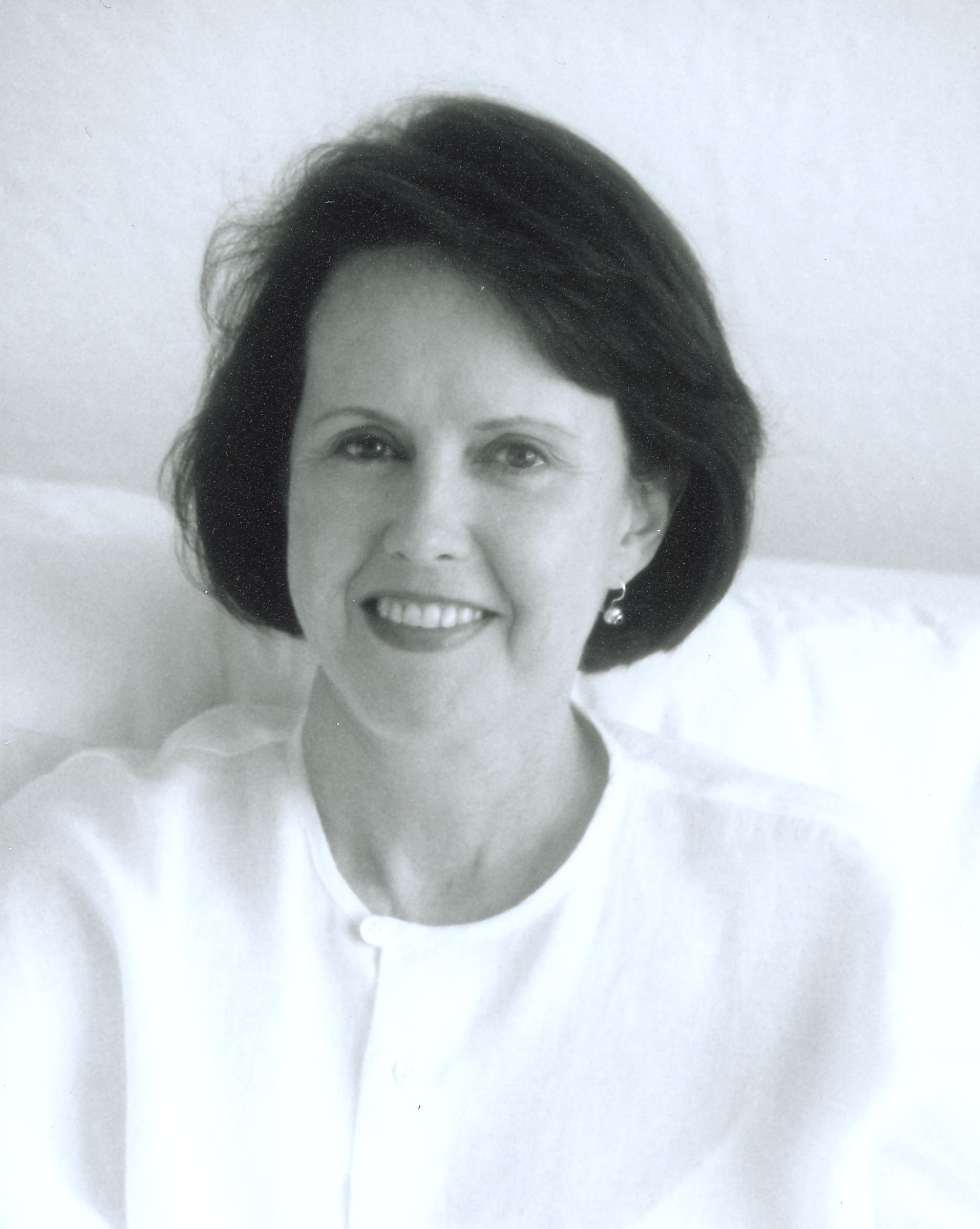
- Stanley in 2002
- Born: December 27, 1943 (age 82) Abilene, Texas, US
- Occupation: Writer; illustrator
- Genre: Children's books; fantasy

Website
- dianestanley.com

Diane Stanley (born December 27, 1943) is an American children's author and illustrator.

== Life and work ==
Stanley was born in Abilene, Texas. She earned her bachelor's degree from Trinity University and her M. A. in medical illustration from Johns Hopkins University College of Medicine. Stanley is the author and/or illustrator of more than sixty books for children, noted especially for her series of picture book biographies. Shaka, King of the Zulus was named a New York Times Best Illustrated Book and Leonardo da Vinci received the Orbis Pictus Award for Outstanding Nonfiction from the National Council for Teachers of English. Many of her books have been honored as American Library Association Notable Books and she has twice received both the Boston Globe/Hornbook Award and the Society of Children's Book Writers' Golden Kite Award. She was the recipient of the Washington Post/Children's Book Guild Award for the body of her work.

She has three grown children and lives in Santa Fe, New Mexico with her husband, Peter Vennema.

== Books ==
=== Biographies and History ===
- The High-Flying, Deep-Diving Adventures of Kathy Sullivan, illustrated by Jessie Hartland, Paula Wiseman Books (2025)
- Alice Waters Cooks Up a Food Revolution, illustrated by Jessie Hartland, Paula Wiseman Books (2022)
- RESIST: Peaceful Acts That Changed our World, Neal Porter Books / Holiday House (2020)
- Ada Lovelace: Poet of Science, illustrated by Jessie Hartland, Paula Wiseman Books (2017)
- Bard of Avon: The Story of William Shakespeare (co-author Peter Vennema), Morrow Junior Books (1992)
- Charles Dickens: The Man Who Had Great Expectations (co-author Peter Vennema), Morrow Junior Books (1993)
- Cleopatra, Morrow Junior Books (1994)
- Good Queen Bess: The Story of Elizabeth I of England (co-author Peter Vennema), Four Winds Press (1990)
- Joan of Arc, Morrow Junior Books (1998)
- Leonardo da Vinci, Morrow Junior Books (1996)
- Michelangelo, HarperCollins (2000)
- Mozart: The Wonder Child - A Puppet Play in Three Acts, HarperCollins (2009)
- Peter the Great, Four Winds Press (1986)
- Saladin: Noble Prince of Islam, HarperCollins (2002)
- Shaka: King of the Zulus (co-author Peter Vennema), Morrow Junior Books (1988)
- The Last Princess (as illustrator only; text by Fay Grissom Stanley), Four Winds Press (1991)
- The Time-Traveling Twins: Joining the Boston Tea Party
- The Time-Traveling Twins: Roughing It on the Oregon Trail
- The Time-Traveling Twins: Thanksgiving on Plymouth Plantation
- The True Adventure of Daniel Hall

=== Fiction ===
Picture books (as illustrator only)

- The Farmer in the Dell (public domain)
- Fiddle-I-Fee (public domain)
- Half-a-Ball-of-Kenki (by Verna Aardema)
- Little Mouse Nibbling (by Tony Johnston)
- Petrosinella, a Neapolitan Rapunzel (by Giambattista Basile)
- Onions, Onions (by Toni Hormann)
- Sleeping Ugly (by Jane Yolen)
- The Man Whose Name Was Not Thomas (by M. Jean Craig)
- Robin of Bray (by Jean and Claudio Marzollo)
- Beach Party (by Joanne Ryder)
- Little Orphant Annie (by James Whitcomb Riley)
- The Month-Brothers (by Samuil Marshak; translation by Thomas P. Whitney)
- All Wet! All Wet! (by James Skofield)

Picture books (as author only)

- The Good Luck Pencil (illustrated by Bruce Degen)
- Siegfried (illustrated by John Sandford)
- Moe the Dog in Tropical Paradise (illustrated by Elise Primavera)
- Woe is Moe (illustrated by Elise Primavera)
- The Gentleman and the Kitchen Maid (illustrated by Dennis Nolan)
- Saving Sweetness (illustrated by G. Brian Karas)
- Raising Sweetness (illustrated by G. Brian Karas)
- The Time-Traveling Twins: Roughing it on the Oregon Trail (illustrated by Holly Berry)
- The Time-Traveling Twins: Joining the Boston Tea Party (illustrated by Holly Berry)
- The Time-Traveling Twins: Thanksgiving on Plymouth Plantation (illustrated by Holly Berry)

Picture books (as author and illustrator)

- The Conversation Club
- A Country Tale
- Birdsong Lullaby
- Captain-Whiz-Bang
- Fortune
- Rumpelstiltskin's Daughter
- The Giant and the Beanstalk
- Goldie and the Three Bears
- The Trouble with Wishes

Novels

- A Time Apart
- The Mysterious Matter of I.M. Fine
- The Mysterious Case of the Allbright Academy
- Bella at Midnight
- Saving Sky
- The Silver Bowl
- The Cup and the Crown
- The Princess of Cortova
- The Chosen Prince
- Joplin, Wishing
- Second Sleep

=== Historical Fiction ===
- Elena
