= Lucius Shepard =

American novelist (1943–2014)

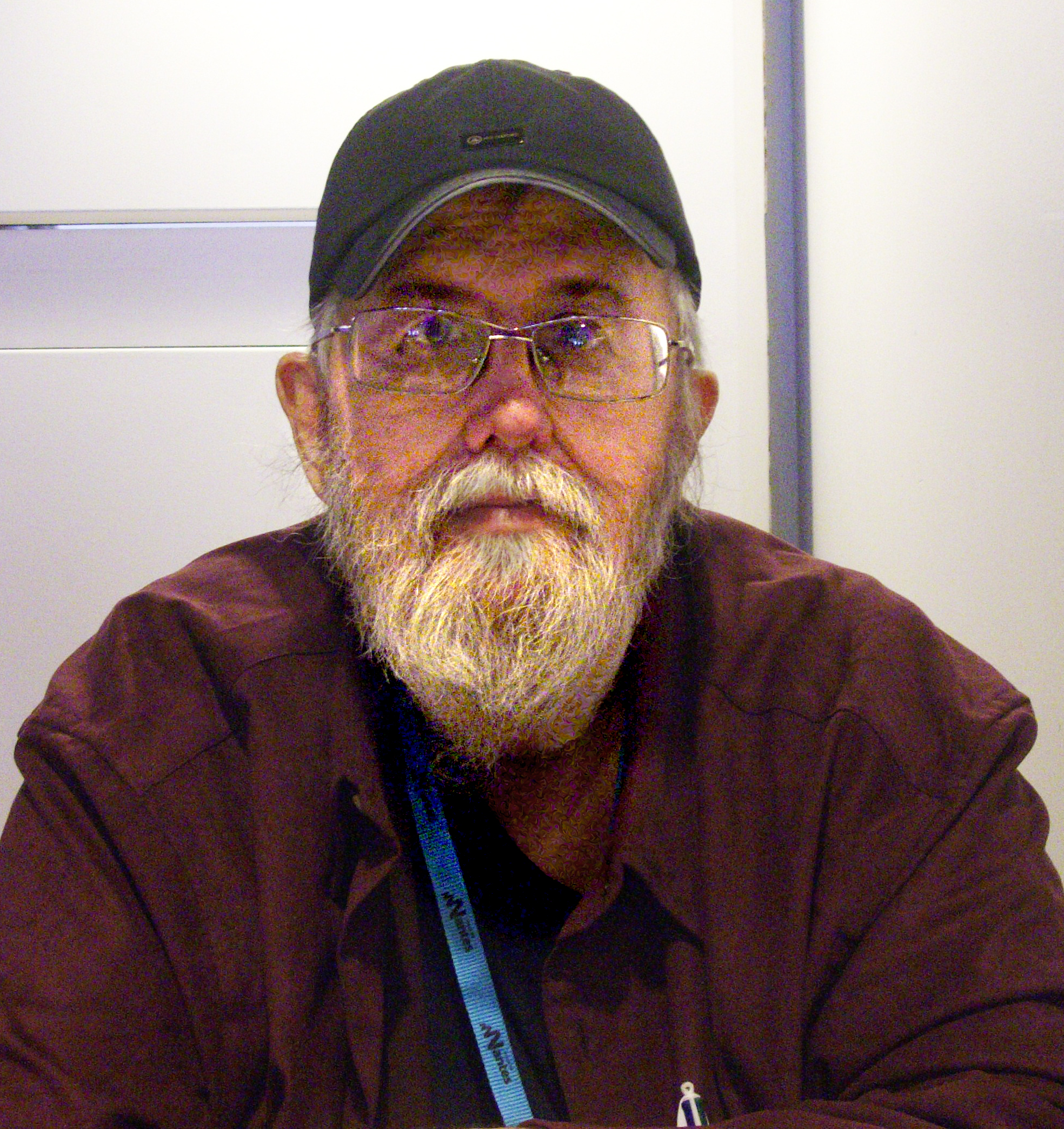
- Lucius Shepard, Utopiales 2011
- Born: August 21, 1943; Lynchburg, Virginia, U.S.
- Died: March 18, 2014 (aged 70); Portland, Oregon, U.S.

Lucius Shepard (August 21, 1943 – March 18, 2014) was an American writer. Classified as a science fiction and fantasy writer, he often leaned into other genres, such as magical realism.

== Career ==
Shepard was a native of Lynchburg, Virginia, where he was born in 1943. His first short stories appeared in 1983, and his first novel, Green Eyes, appeared in 1984. At the time, he was considered part of the cyberpunk movement. Shepard came to writing late, having first enjoyed a varied career, including a stint playing rock and roll in the Midwest and extensive travel throughout Europe and Asia. Algis Budrys, reviewing Green Eyes, praised Shepard's "ease of narrative style that comes only from a profound love and respect for the language and the literatures that have graced it."

Lucius Shepard won several awards for his science fiction: in 1985 he won the John W. Campbell Award for Best New Writer, followed in 1987 with a Nebula Award for Best Novella for his story "R&R". This story later became part of his 1987 novel Life During Wartime, which won the Kurd-Laßwitz-Preis in 1990. His novella "Barnacle Bill the Spacer" won a Hugo Award in 1993. His poem "White Trains" won the Rhysling Award in 1988. Two early collections of short stories won the World Fantasy Award for best collection: The Jaguar Hunter in 1988 and The Ends of the Earth Collection in 1992. His novella "Vacancy" won a Shirley Jackson Award in 2008.

Lucius Shepard resided in Portland, Oregon.

== Themes and evolution ==
Shepard embraced many different themes throughout his career. In his early work, he wrote extensively about Central America. This included clearly science-fictional stories about near future high-tech jungle war (such as "R&R" and "Salvador"), as well as stories that seemed more in line with magic realism. Many of these, such as "Black Coral" (which concerns an American living on an island off of Honduras) and "The Jaguar Hunter" (the story of a man whose wife's debt forces him to hunt a mythical black jaguar, which his people consider sacred), explore cultural clashes. Shepard traveled extensively in Central America and lived there for a time.

Shepard stopped writing fiction for much of the 1990s. He returned near the end of that decade, producing such works as the novella Radiant Green Star, which won a Locus Award for Best Novella in 2001. Though he still wrote Central American fiction, Shepard's interest seemed to be moving north: he published two short novels, "A Handbook of American Prayer" and "Viator", both set in North America. On that same note, he published many works where culture and geography were secondary (his novella "Jailwise" is a prime example), preferring to focus on wider questions such as the role of justice in society.

Much of Shepard's later work was nonfiction. He researched the Freight Train Riders of America and spent time riding the rails, writing both fiction and nonfiction based on those experiences. He was also a regular movie reviewer for The Magazine of Fantasy & Science Fiction and electricstory.com. His reviews are marked by general contempt for the current state of American film.

According to fellow author James Patrick Kelly, Shepard was an avid sports fan who often used dramatic sports moments as inspiration to write.

In the summer of 2008, Shepard moved to Neuchatel, Switzerland in order to work on several screenplays. He served on the jury of the Neuchâtel International Fantastic Film Festival (NIFFF) with the American director Joe Dante.

He died in March 2014 at the age of 70 of complications from a stroke.

== Bibliography ==
=== Novels ===
- Shepard, Lucius (1984). Green eyes. New York: Ace.
- — (1987). Life during wartime. New York: Bantam.
- — (1993). The Golden. Shingletown, Calif.: Mark V. Ziesing.
- — (2003). Colonel Rutherford's colt. Burton, Mich.: Subterranean Press.
- — (2003). Floater. Hornsea, England: PS Publishing.
- — (2004). Viator. San Francisco: Night Shade Books.
- — (2005). Trujillo. San Francisco: Night Shade Books.
- — (2006). A handbook of American prayer : a novel. New York: Thunder's Mouth Press.
- — (2007). Softspoken. San Francisco: Night Shade Books.
- — (2014). Beautiful blood : a novel of the Dragon Griaule. Burton, Mich.: Subterranean Press.

=== Short fiction ===
Collections

- Shepard, Lucius (1987). The jaguar hunter. Sauk City, Wisc.: Arkham House.
- Shepard, Lucius & Robert Frazier (1989). Nantucket Slayrides: Three Short Novels. Nantucket, Mass.: Eel Grass Press.
- Shepard, Lucius (1991). The ends of the Earth. Sauk City, Wisc.: Arkham House.
- — (1994). Sports & Music. Shingletown, Calif.: Mark V. Ziesing.
- — (1997). Barnacle Bill the Spacer and Other Stories. London: Orion. (Note: Later published in the United States as Beast of the heartland and other stories.)
- — (1999). Beast of the Heartland and Other Stories. New York: Four Walls Eight Windows. (Note: Originally published in the United Kingdom as Barnacle Bill the Spacer and other stories.)
- — (2001). The Jaguar Hunter (2nd, revised ed.). New York: Four Walls Eight Windows.
- — (2004). Trujillo and Other Stories. Hornsea, England: PS Publishing.
- — (2004). Two trains running. Urbana, Ill.: Golden Griffin Press.
- — (2005). Eternity and Other Stories. New York: Thunder's Mouth Press.
- — (2007). Dagger Key and other stories. Hornsea, England: PS Publishing.
- — (2008). The Best of Lucius Shepard. Burton, Mich.: Subterranean Press.
- — (2008). Skull City and Other Lost Tales. Burton, Mich.: Subterranean Press.
- — (2009). Vacancy & Ariel. Burton, Mich.: Subterranean Press.
- — (2009). Viator Plus. Hornsea, England: PS Publishing.
- — (2012). The Dragon Griaule. Burton, Mich.: Subterranean Press.
- — (2013). Five Autobiographies and a Fiction. Burton, Mich.: Subterranean Press.
- — (2021). Sheehan, Bill (ed.). The best of Lucius Shepard : volume two. Burton, Mich.: Subterranean Press.
- — (2024). Crows and Silences: Selected Short Novels. Burton, Mich.: Subterranean Press.

Stories (Note: Short stories unless otherwise noted.)

Title	Year	First published	Reprinted/collected	Notes
"All the perfumes of Araby"	1992	Shepard, Lucius (1992). "All the perfumes of Araby". In Datlow, Ellen (ed.). Omni best science fiction two. OMNI Books.		Novelette
"The All-Consuming"	1990	Frazier, Robert & Lucius Shepard (July 1990). "The All-Consuming". Playboy.		
"The Arcevoalo"	1986	Shepard, Lucius (October 1986). "The Arcevoalo". F&SF. 71 (4).		Novelette
Ariel	2003	Shepard, Lucius (October–November 2003). "Ariel". Isaac Asimov's Science Fiction.	Shepard, Lucius (2021). "Ariel". In Sheehan, Bill (ed.). The best of Lucius Shepard : volume two. Burton, Mich.: Subterranean Press. pp. 551–624.	Novella
Aymara	1986	Shepard, Lucius (August 1986). "Aymara". Isaac Asimov's Science Fiction Magazine. 10 (8).		Novelette
AZTECHS	2001	Shepard, Lucius (September 5, 2001). "AZTECHS". Sci Fiction. Syfy. Archived from the original on 2001-11-25.	Shepard, Lucius (2003). AZTECHS. Subterranean Press.; Shepard, Lucius (2021). "AZTECHS". In Sheehan, Bill (ed.). The best of Lucius Shepard : volume two. Burton, Mich.: Subterranean Press. pp. 369–445.	Novella/chapbook
Barnacle Bill the Spacer	1992	Shepard, Lucius (July 1992). "Barnacle Bill the Spacer". Isaac Asimov's Science Fiction Magazine.	Shepard, Lucius (2021). "Barnacle Bill the Spacer". In Sheehan, Bill (ed.). The best of Lucius Shepard : volume two. Burton, Mich.: Subterranean Press. pp. 87–170.	Novella
"Beast of the heartland"	1992	Shepard, Lucius (September 1992). "Beast of the heartland". Playboy.		
"The black clay boy"	1987	Shepard, Lucius (1987). "The black clay boy". In Schiff, Stuart David (ed.). Whispers VI. Doubleday.		
"Black coral"	1984	Shepard, Lucius (1984). "Black coral". In Carr, Terry (ed.). Universe 14. Doubleday.		
"Bound for glory"	1989	Shepard, Lucius (October 1989). "Bound for glory". F&SF.		
"Chango"	1989	Shepard, Lucius (June 1989). "Chango". Ice River. 4.		
Crocodile rock	1999	Shepard, Lucius (October 1999). "Crocodile rock". F&SF.	Shepard, Lucius (2021). "Crocodile rock". In Sheehan, Bill (ed.). The best of Lucius Shepard : volume two. Burton, Mich.: Subterranean Press. pp. 319–367.	Novella
Dagger Key	2007	Shepard, Lucius (2007). "Dagger Key". Dagger Key and other stories. Hornsea, England: PS Publishing.	Shepard, Lucius (2021). "Dagger Key". In Sheehan, Bill (ed.). The best of Lucius Shepard : volume two. Burton, Mich.: Subterranean Press. pp. 701–758.	Novella
"Dancing it all away at Nadoka"	1986	Shepard, Lucius (December 1986). "Dancing it all away at Nadoka". Isaac Asimov's Science Fiction. (Note: Issue is dated "Mid-December".)		
"Delta Sly Honey"	1987	Shepard, Lucius (1987). "Delta Sly Honey". In Dann, Jeanne Van Buren & Jack M. Dann (eds.). In the field of fire. Tor.	Shepard, Lucius (October 1987). "Delta Sly Honey". Rod Serling's the Twilight Zone Magazine.	
Dog-eared paperback of my life	2009	Shepard, Lucius (2009). "Dog-eared paperback of my life". In Gevers, Nick & Jay Lake (eds.). Other Earths. DAW Books.	Shepard, Lucius (2021). "Dog-eared paperback of my life". In Sheehan, Bill (ed.). The best of Lucius Shepard : volume two. Burton, Mich.: Subterranean Press. pp. 759–844.	Novella
The drive-in Puerto Rico	2002	Shepard, Lucius (October–November 2002). "The drive-in Puerto Rico". F&SF.	Shepard, Lucius (2021). "The drive-in Puerto Rico". In Sheehan, Bill (ed.). The best of Lucius Shepard : volume two. Burton, Mich.: Subterranean Press. pp. 447–505.	Novella
"The end of life as we know it"	1985	Shepard, Lucius (January 1985). "The end of life as we know it". Isaac Asimov's Science Fiction Magazine.		
"The ends of the Earth"	1989	Shepard, Lucius (March 1989). "The ends of the Earth". F&SF.		
Eternity and afterward	2001	"Eternity and afterward". F&SF. 100 (3): 11–84. March 2001.		Novella
"The etheric transmitter"	1984	Shepard, Lucius (1984). "The etheric transmitter". In Knight, Damon (ed.). The Clarion Awards. Doubleday.		
"The exercise of faith"	1987	Shepard, Lucius (June 1987). "The exercise of faith". Rod Serling's the Twilight Zone Magazine.		
The Father of Stones	1989	Shepard, Lucius (1989). The Father of Stones. Baltimore: WSFA Press.	Shepard, Lucius (September 1989). "The Father of Stones". Isaac Asimov's Science Fiction Magazine.	Novella/Chapbook
"Fire Zone Emerald"	1986	Shepard, Lucius (February 1986). "Fire Zone Emerald". Playboy.		
"The fundamental things"	1985	Shepard, Lucius (July 1985). "The fundamental things". Isaac Asimov's Science Fiction Magazine.		
"The glassblower's dragon"	1987	Shepard, Lucius (April 1987). "The glassblower's dragon". F&SF.		
Halloween Town	2009	Shepard, Lucius (October 2009). "Halloween Town". F&SF.		Novella
"... How my heart breaks when I sing this song ..."	1985	Shepard, Lucius (December 1985). "... How my heart breaks when I sing this song ...". Isaac Asimov's Science Fiction Magazine.		
"How the wind spoke at Madaket"	1985	Shepard, Lucius (April 1985). "How the wind spoke at Madaket". Isaac Asimov's Science Fiction Magazine.		
Human history	1995	Shepard, Lucius (1995). "Human history". In Brown, Stephen P. (ed.). 21st Annual World Fantasy Convention program book. Baltimore Gun Club.	Shepard, Lucius (2021). "Human history". In Sheehan, Bill (ed.). The best of Lucius Shepard : volume two. Burton, Mich.: Subterranean Press. pp. 229–318.	Novella
"Jack's decline"	1988	Shepard, Lucius (1988). "Jack's decline". In Casper, Susan & Gardner Dozois (eds.). Ripper!. Tor.		
"The jaguar hunter"	1985	Shepard, Lucius (May 1985). "The jaguar hunter". F&SF.		
"Jail bait"	2004	Shepard, Lucius (2004). "Jail bait". Two trains running. Urbana, Ill.: Golden Griffin Press.	Shepard, Lucius (2021). "Jailbait". In Sheehan, Bill (ed.). The best of Lucius Shepard : volume two. Burton, Mich.: Subterranean Press. pp. 673–699.	Novelette
Kalimantan	1990	Shepard, Lucius (1990). Kalimantan. Legend/Century.		Novella/Chapbook
The last time	1994	Datlow, Ellen, ed. (1994). Little deaths : 24 tales of sex and horror. Millennium.	Shepard, Lucius (1995). The last time. Mission Viejo, Calif.: A.S.A.P.; Shepard, Lucius (2021). "The last time". In Sheehan, Bill (ed.). The best of Lucius Shepard : volume two. Burton, Mich.: Subterranean Press. pp. 171–227.	Novella/Chapbook
Liar's house	2003			Novella/Chapbook; "The Dragon Griaule"
"Life of Buddha"	1988	Shepard, Lucius (May 1988). "Life of Buddha". Omni.		
"A little night music"	1992	Shepard, Lucius (March 1992). "A little night music". Omni.		
Louisiana breakdown	2003			Novella
"The man who painted the Dragon Griaule"	1984	F&SF, December 1984		"The Dragon Griaule"
"Mengele"	1985	Shepard, Lucius (1985). "Mengele". In Carr, Terry (ed.). Universe 15. Doubleday.		
"The night of White Bhairab"	1984	F&SF, October 1984		
"Noman's land"	1988	Isaac Asimov's Science Fiction Magazine, Oct 1988		
"On the border"	1987	Isaac Asimov's Science Fiction Magazine, August 1987		
"A personal matter"	1993	Amazing Stories, July 1993		Excerpt from The Golden
Pizza man	1996	Shepard, Lucius (September 1996). "Pizza man". Playboy.		
"R & R"	1986	Isaac Asimov's Science Fiction Magazine, April 1986		
"Radiant green star"	2000	Isaac Asimov's Science Fiction Magazine, August 2000		
"Reaper"	1984	Isaac Asimov's Science Fiction Magazine, December 1984		
"Romance of the Century"	2000	Shepard, Lucius (2000). "Romance of the Century". Activities. Visionary Adventures. GORP. The Away Network. Archived from the original on 2003-10-21.		
"Salvador"	1984	F&SF, April 1984	The Year's Best Science Fiction: Second Annual Collection, ed. Gardner Dozois	
The Scalehunter's Beautiful Daughter	1988	Shepard, Lucius (1988). The scalehunter's beautiful daughter. Willimantic, CT: Mark V. Ziesing.	Isaac Asimov's Science Fiction Magazine, September 1988	Novella/Chapbook
"Shades"	1987	Shepard, Lucius (1987). "Shades". In Dann, Jeanne Van Buren & Jack M. Dann (eds.). In the field of fire. Tor.	Isaac Asimov's Science Fiction Magazine, December 1987	
The skull	2012	Subterranean Press		Novella
"Skull City"	1990	Isaac Asimov's Science Fiction Magazine, July 1990		
"Solitario's eyes"	1983	F&SF, September 1983		
"A Spanish lesson"	1985	F&SF, December 1985		
"Sparring partner"	2001	Playboy, March 2001		
"Sports in America"	1991	Playboy, July 1991		
Stars seen through stone	2007	F&SF, July 2007		Novella
"The storming of Annie Kinsdale"	1984	Isaac Asimov's Science Fiction Magazine, September 1984		
"The sun spider"	1987	Isaac Asimov's Science Fiction Magazine, April 1987		
"Surrender"	1989	Shepard, Lucius (August 1989). "Surrender". Isaac Asimov's Science Fiction Magazine.	Shepard, Lucius (2021). "Surrender". In Sheehan, Bill (ed.). The best of Lucius Shepard : volume two. Burton, Mich.: Subterranean Press. pp. 63–86.	Novelette
The Taborin Scale	2010	Subterranean Press		Novella
"The Taylorsville reconstruction"	1983	Shepard, Lucius (1983). "The Taylorsville reconstruction". In Carr, Terry (ed.). Universe 13. Doubleday.		
A traveler's tale	1984	Shepard, Lucius (July 1984). "A traveler's tale". Isaac Asimov's Science Fiction Magazine.	Shepard, Lucius (2021). "A traveler's tale". In Sheehan, Bill (ed.). The best of Lucius Shepard : volume two. Burton, Mich.: Subterranean Press. pp. 7–62.	Novella
Valentine	2002	Four Walls Eight Windows		Novella
"Victory"	1992	Omni, May 1992		
"Voyage south from Thousand Willows"	1986	Shepard, Lucius (1986). "Voyage south from Thousand Willows". In Carr, Terry (ed.). Universe 16. Doubleday.		
A walk in the garden	2003	Shepard, Lucius (August 2003). "A walk in the garden". Sci Fiction. Archived from the original on 2008-02-20.	Shepard, Lucius (2021). "A walk in the garden". In Sheehan, Bill (ed.). The best of Lucius Shepard : volume two. Burton, Mich.: Subterranean Press. pp. 507–549.	Novelette
"The way it sometimes happens"	1988	Isaac Asimov's Science Fiction Magazine, December 1988		
"A wooden tiger"	1988	F&SF, October 1988		
"Youthful folly"	1988	Omni, November 1988		

=== Poetry ===
Chapbooks

- Shepard, Lucius (1967). Cantata of death, weakmind & generation. Chapel Hill, N. C.: Lillabulero Press.

List of poems

Title	Year	First published	Reprinted/collected
Cantata of death, weakmind & generation	1967	Shepard, Lucius (1967). Cantata of death, weakmind & generation. Chapel Hill, N. C.: Lillabulero Press.	
Challenger as viewed from the Westerbrook Bar	1986	Shepard, Lucius (October 1986). "Challenger as viewed from the Westerbrook Bar". Isaac Asimov's Science Fiction Magazine.	
Pictures made of stones	1987	Shepard, Lucius (September 1987). "Pictures made of stones". Omni. 9 (12).	
White trains	1987	Shepard, Lucius (Spring 1987). "White trains". Night Cry.	

=== Non-fiction ===
- Shepard, Lucius (February 1985). "How I spent my summer vacation : a student perspective on Clarion". Isaac Asimov's Science Fiction.
- — (1989). "Introduction". In Garnett, David (ed.). Orbit science fiction yearbook two. Orbit.
- — (Winter 1989). "Waiting for the barbarians". Journal Wired.
- — (Spring 1990). "Remedial reading for the generation of swine". Journal Wired.
- — (Summer–Fall 1990). "Stark raving : George Bush and the Pineapple of Doom". Journal Wired.
- — (February 1991). "Read this". The New York Review of Science Fiction.
- — (1992). "Incident in the Petén". In Boston, Bruce & Robert Frazier (eds.). Chronicles of the mutant rain forest. Horror's Head Press.
- — (1995). "Avram Davidson 1923-1993". In Sargent, Pamela (ed.). Nebula Awards 29. Harcourt Brace.
- — (1996). "God is in the details". In Wilson, Robin (ed.). Paragons. St. Martin's Press.
- — (Fall 1996). "An appreciation of Avram Davidson". Eidolon.
- — (1997). "Introduction". In Waldrop, Howard (ed.). Going home again. Eidolon Publications.
- — (1998). "The year in science fiction and fantasy : a symposium". In Dann, Jack (ed.). Nebula Awards 32. Harvest.
- — (1998). "Afterword". In Davis, Grania (ed.). The Avram Davidson treasury. Tor.
- — (October 14, 1998). "This space for advertising". Event Horizon.
- — (January 14, 1999). "The millenium cucaracha". Event Horizon.
- — (May 18, 1999). "The Littleton Follies". Event Horizon.
- — (2005). Weapons of mass seduction.

=== Film reviews ===
Film title	Director	Reviewed in
X-Men	Bryan Singer	Shepard, Lucius (Dec 2000). "eXcreMENt". Films. F&SF. 99 (6): 104–108. Archived from the original on December 27, 2004.
Lost Souls	Janusz Kaminski	Shepard, Lucius (March 2001). "The exorcist's children and Rosemary's yuppie". Films. F&SF. 100 (3): 125–131.
Iron Man	Jon Favreau	Shepard, Lucius (October–November 2008). "Things that go clank in the night". Films. F&SF. 115 (4&5): 149–154.
District 9	Neill Blomkamp	Shepard, Lucius (January–February 2010). "A pair of nines". Films. F&SF. 118 (1&2): 187–192.
9	Shane Acker	Shepard, Lucius (January–February 2010). "A pair of nines". Films. F&SF. 118 (1&2): 187–192.
Jennifer's Body	Karyn Kusama	Shepard, Lucius (January–February 2010). "A pair of nines". Films. F&SF. 118 (1&2): 187–192.
Pandorum	Christian Alvart	Shepard, Lucius (January–February 2010). "A pair of nines". Films. F&SF. 118 (1&2): 187–192.
The Adjustment Bureau	George Nolfi	Shepard, Lucius (July–August 2011). "Free will hunting". Films. F&SF. 121 (1&2): 147–152.
Paul	Greg Mottola	Shepard, Lucius (July–August 2011). "Free will hunting". Films. F&SF. 121 (1&2): 147–152.
Battle: Los Angeles	Jonathan Liebesman	Shepard, Lucius (July–August 2011). "Free will hunting". Films. F&SF. 121 (1&2): 147–152.

=== Comics ===
- Shepard, Lucius (w) Vermillion (1996–1997).
- Shepard, Lucius (w), James Romberger, Marguerite Van Cook (a). "Platinum nights" Gangland, no. 2 (1998). Vertigo.

=== Critical studies and reviews of Shepard's work ===
- Dunn, Katherine (March 2001). "An introduction to Lucius Shepard". F&SF. 100 (3): 4–10.
- "Lucius Taylor Shepard : bibliography". F&SF. 100 (3): 85–88. March 2001.
- Williams, Sheila (September 2014). "Lucius Shepard, he was a friend of mine". Editorial. Asimov's Science Fiction. 38 (9): 4–5.

Beautiful blood

- Di Filippo, Paul (January 2015). "On Books". Asimov's Science Fiction. 39 (1): 102–106.

Five autobiographies and a fiction

- Di Filippo, Paul (January 2014). "On Books". Asimov's Science Fiction. 38 (1): 101–105.

———————
