= Good Queen Bess (book) =

1990 biography by Diane Stanley and Peter Vennema

Good Queen Bess: The Story of Elizabeth I of England
- Authors: Diane Stanley, Peter Vennema
- Illustrator: Diane Stanley
- Language: English
- Subject: Children's non-fiction literature, Biography, Elizabeth I of England
- Published: 1990 (Four Winds Press)
- Publication place: USA
- Media type: Print (hardback)
- Pages: 40 (unpaginated)
- ISBN: 9780027868104
- OCLC: 18983839

Good Queen Bess: The Story of Elizabeth I of England is a 1990 children's biography by Diane Stanley and Peter Vennema. It describes the life and times during her reign from 1558 to 1603.

== Reception ==
Booklist wrote "This biography of Queen Elizabeth I does an excellent job of describing the context of her life so that reasons for many of her actions become clear. The resulting depth is a pleasant surprise and will give the book a wide audience." while the School Library Journal wrote "Although the format suggests a picture-book audience, this biography needs to be introduced to older readers who have the background to appreciate and understand this woman who dominated and named an age.."

Kirkus Reviews called Good Queen Bess "An admirably clear, attractive summary." Publishers Weekly wrote "The authors .. vivify another colorful character"

In 1991, the book was categorized as a Non-fiction Honor Book by the Boston Globe–Horn Book Awards.
