= Middle Passage (novel) =

1990 novel by Charles Johnson

- First edition
- Author: Charles R. Johnson
- Language: English
- Genre: Historical novel
- Publisher: Atheneum Publishers
- Publication date: 1990
- Publication place: United States
- ISBN: 0-684-85588-7
- Preceded by: Being and Race
- Followed by: Dreamer: A Novel

Middle Passage (1990) is a historical novel by American writer Charles R. Johnson about the final voyage of an illegal American slave ship on the Middle Passage. Set in 1830, it presents a personal and historical perspective of the illegal slave trade in the United States, telling the story of Rutherford Calhoun, a freed slave who sneaks aboard a slave ship bound for Africa in order to escape a forced marriage. The novel received critical acclaim, winning the 1990 U.S. National Book Award for Fiction.

== Plot summary ==
The protagonist is Rutherford Calhoun, a freed slave, who flees from New Orleans on a ship called the Republic to escape being blackmailed into marriage by Isadora Bailey, a schoolteacher who convinces Calhoun's creditor, Papa Zeringue, that she will pay Calhoun's debts if he will marry her. Drinking to forget his troubles, Calhoun meets the drunken cook of the Republic and decides to escape Isadora and Zeringue by stowing away aboard the ship, where he is quickly discovered and put to work without pay. The ship travels to Africa to capture members of the Allmuseri tribe to take back to America to sell as slaves. Although an educated man, Calhoun is at first self-absorbed and thus initially unable to grasp the hardships of slave life. During the voyage, he is humbled by the conditions he observes, learning lessons that teach him to value and respect humanity, which includes identification with his own country, America.

Calhoun discovers that the Allmuseri are not the only cargo on board: the captain of the Republic, a philosophical but tyrannical man named Ebenezer Falcon, also uses his voyages to plunder cultural artifacts that could be sold to museums, and on this trip he has purchased what he claims to be the Allmuseri's god. The other sailors, already believing the Allmuseri to be sorcerers, begin to worry that their voyage is doomed; when they send down a young man to check out the secret cargo, he returns insane. Shortly after the ship sets back for the States, a violent storm hits, worse than any the sailors have seen. Barely escaping with their lives, several of the sailors decide to mutiny, but they are preempted when the Allmuseri get the keys to the shackles and take over the ship first. Calhoun convinces the Allmuseri to leave alive the few remaining white sailors in order to navigate the ship back to Africa, but Falcon commits suicide rather than help them. The first mate, Peter Cringle, tries to steer the ship, but cannot figure out where in the ocean they are, claiming that since the storm, none of the constellations are where they are supposed to be. During this time, Calhoun takes his turn going down to the cargo hold to feed the creature, who gives him a mystical vision of his life and family that renders him unconscious for three days. When he awakens, he learns that Cringle has been murdered and cannibalized, reportedly on Cringle's own suggestion, leaving only himself, the cook, and several Allmuseri on board the ship, which is rapidly falling apart.

Before completely disintegrating into the ocean, the ship is seen by another vessel, the Juno, which manages to rescue five survivors: Calhoun, the cook, and three Allmuseri youth. Calhoun discovers that Isadora is aboard the Juno and is being forced to marry Papa Zeringue, who partially owns the Republic. Papa learns that Calhoun has the ship's log, documenting Zeringue's immoral and illegal dealings, and he bargains with Calhoun to get possession of it. Calhoun mentions that the ship was illegally dealing in the slave trade and uses the ties of Santos, Papa's black servant, to the Allmuseri to get Zeringue to let Santos and Isadora go free. Calhoun has been profoundly changed by his experience during the Middle Passage. Falcon, the Allmuseri, his mystical encounter with the god, and the ship's ultimate sinking have caused him to reflect deeply on his own life and attitude, and he is able to resolve many of his internal conflicts (such as his anger toward his runaway father and his over-accommodating brother); he is now able to care for other people, including Isadora as well as one of the Allmuseri children who had adopted him as her surrogate parent on the ship. Isadora, who is knitting booties for her cats and dogs whom Papa is making her give up, leaves Papa and marries Rutherford.

== Characters in Middle Passage ==
- Captain Ebenezer Falcon: Captain of the Republic, a veteran mariner involved in illegal slave trading.
- Rutherford Calhoun: Protagonist of the story; a freed slave who stows away aboard the Republic.
- Ngonyama: Allmuseri tribesman on the Republic, being transported to America in the illegal slave trade, who takes charge of the ship after the mutiny.
- Isadora Bailey: Schoolteacher whom Calhoun escapes being blackmailed into marrying. Nevertheless, they plan to marry by the end of the story.
- Papa: Creditor of Rutherford Calhoun. He is also part owner of the Republic.
- Peter Cringle: The First Mate of the ship. Calhoun considers him a very moral man.
- Josiah Squibb: The ship's cook. Calhoun is employed as his assistant during the voyage.
- Baleka: An Allmuseri girl whom Calhoun comes to care for.

== See also ==
- Middle Passage, a major segment of the Atlantic slave trade route
