= Scotland: A New History =

1990 Scottish history book by Michael Lynch

- Author: Michael Lynch
- Publisher: Century Limited
- Publication date: 1990
- ISBN: 0-7126-9893-0

Scotland: A New History is a book by Michael Lynch first published by Century Limited in 1990. Pimlico (20 Vauxhall Road, London SW1V 2SA) published a revised edition in 1992 and reprinted this later edition in 1992 and 1993.
