= Socorro Girón =

Puerto Rican historian, writer, and scholar

- Born: 9 March 1919; Ponce, Puerto Rico
- Died: 2005; Ponce, Puerto Rico
- Occupations: Historian, writer, and scholar
- Spouse: Onofre Segura Limardo
- Children: Bernardo Segura Giron; Onofre Segura Giron

Socorro Girón (9 March 1919 – 2005) was a Puerto Rican historian, writer, and scholar. She is best known for her legendary book "Ponce, el teatro La Perla y La Campana de la Almudaina: Historia de Ponce desde sus comienzos hasta la Segunda Decada del Siglo XX." (Ponce, el teatro La Perla and La Campana de la Almudaina: History of Ponce from its beginnings to the second decade of the 20th century.)

== Early years and schooling ==
Girón was born in Ponce, Puerto Rico in 1919. She received her Ph.D. in Hispanic Studies from the University of Puerto Rico at Rio Piedras in 1984.

== Career ==
=== Professor and scholar ===
In 1965, after having received her M.A. degree (1962), Girón published her first major work titled "Gregorio Marañon, escritor" (Gregorio Marañon, writer). This was followed by several additional works. In 1973, mayor Luis A. Morales granted her the ad honorem title of Official Historian of the Government of Municipality of Ponce. In 1984, she became a professor of history at the Pontifical Catholic University of Puerto Rico, where she taught for over 20 years.

=== Researcher, historian and writer ===
Girón was a highly regarded historian, receiving many honors and accolades. Her area of research was Spanish and Puerto Rican history. She published various books, among them her masterpiece "Ponce, el teatro La Perla y La Campana de la Almudaina: Historia de Ponce desde sus comienzos hasta la Segunda Decada del Siglo XX." The book printed three editions. She also published in several journals, including the journal of the University of Puerto Rico at Ponce (Revista Ceiba). She was also editor to various works of other authors, among them Las Fiestas Populares de Ponce by Ramon Marin.

== Family life ==
Socorro Girón married Onofre Segura Limardo in Ponce, Puerto Rico, in 1939. She had two children: Bernardo Segura Giron and Onofre Segura Giron.

== Death ==
Girón died in 2005 in Ponce, Puerto Rico.

== Works ==
Among her better known works are:

- Jose Gautier Benitez: Vida y Epoca. Palma, Mallorca, Spain: Editorial Mossèn Alcover (1961)
- Gregorio Marañon, Escritor. Spain: Editorial Mossèn Alcover (1962)
- Vida y Obra de Naria Bibliana y Alejandrina Benitez. (Co-authored with María Bibiana Benítez and Alejandrina Benítez). Palma, Mallorca, Spain: Editorial Mossèn Alcover (1967).
- Apuntes biográficos de Manuel Antonio Zavala y Rodríguez, 1859–1925. Guayanilla, Puerto Rico: Centro Cultural de Guayanilla. (1979)
- Vida y obra de José Gautier Benítez. San Juan, Puerto Rico: Instituto de Cultura Puertorriqueña. (1980)
- Ponce, el teatro La Perla y la campana de la Almudaina. Ponce, Puerto Rico: Gobierno Municipal de Ponce. (1st ed., 1986; 2nd ed., 1987; 3rd ed, 1992)
- Bonafoux y su época. Ponce, Puerto Rico: Gobierno Municipal de Ponce. (1987)
- Ramón Marín y su tiempo. Ponce, Puerto Rico: Gobierno Municipal de Ponce. (1988). Also published in 1994 by Editorial de la Universidad de Puerto Rico as part of the one-volume book titled "Las Fiestas Populares de Ponce" by Ramón Marín (including "Ramón Marín y su tiempo" by Socorro Giron, "Las Fiestas Populares de Ponce" by Ramón Marín, "Ponce Pintoresco" by J.P.Camy, and "La Villa de Ponce" by Ramón Marín.

== Honors and recognitions ==
- In 2013, the University of Puerto Rico at Ponce Library (Biblioteca Adelina Coppin Alvarado) named its Center for Puerto Rican Studies, "Centro de Estudios Puertorriqueños Socorro Girón" (Socorro Girón Center for Puerto Rican Studies), in her honor.
- She is recognized at Ponce's Park of Illustrious Ponce Citizens as one of Ponce's great historians.

== See also ==
- Ponce, Puerto Rico
- List of Puerto Ricans
