= Still I Rise: A Cartoon History of African Americans =

1997 book

- Author: Roland Owen Laird Jr. and Taneshia Nash Laird
- Illustrator: Elihu Bay
- Language: English
- Published: September, 1997
- Publisher: W. W. Norton
- Pages: 206
- ISBN: 039331751X

Still I Rise: A Cartoon History of African Americans is a book co-authored by Roland Owen Laird Jr. and Taneshia Nash Laird. It is illustrated by Elihu Adolfo Bey. First published in September 1997, it told the history of African Americans in a 200+ page cartoon narrative. Still I Rise covers the history of black people in America between the time periods of 1618 and 1995, when African craftspeople and farmers were brought over as indentured servants to the Million Man March.

The authors analyze topics such as militancy, separatism, and integration, focusing on black leaders such as Harriet Tubman, Frederick Douglass, and Martin Luther King Jr.

== Plot summary ==
Still I Rise begins with an introduction by Charles Johnson about black cartoonists and the subjects they dealt with. The book uses two elderly narrators, one male and one female. The book depicts African American history starting in 1618. Around this time, in an effort to stem the rising cost of European indentured servants, Africans willing to indenture themselves were starting to be imported. These African servants did well for themselves because they were more skilled than their European counterparts.

The success of the African Americans sparked resentment among white indentured servants and free whites. Due to their success, Africans started to buy out their contracts, which prompted owners to illegally lengthen African contracts to ban the buy-out problem. The action of the owners caused the African American servants to try and resort to the legal system or run away. However, neither of these options worked, and those who ran away had their contracts extended indefinitely. The black servants resorted to rebellion in the form of Bacon's Rebellion in 1676. However, the rebellion was put down, and by 1677, slavery was official in all the colonies. Still I Rise continues to write about free blacks such as Benjamin Banneker, who "built the first striking clock wholly of American-made parts."

== Authors ==
Roland Laird grew up in New York, and graduated from Brown University. At Brown, he co-founded the NY Chapter of Brown University’s Page Black Alumni Council. Roland Laird is also the founder and CEO of Posro Media. Roland’s wife, Taneshia Nash Laird, is a co-author of the book Still I Rise. Roland Laird died in 2013.

Elihu Adofo Bey is the illustrator for Still I Rise. Elihu started reading comic books when he was 6, and has been drawing ever since. Bey has stated that black comic artists have traditionally drawn white or black characters who fall into the superhero stereotype. "I want my drawings to convey emotion and spirituality," he said.

Charles Johnson is responsible for the introduction to the book. Charles Johnson is the author of four novels: Faith and the Good Thing (1974), Oxherding Tale (1982), Middle Passage (1990), and Dreamer (Scribner, 1998). Charles Johnson said that the book "Still I Rise is a great contribution. It not only tells history, it makes history."

== See also ==
- Still I Rise: A Graphic History of African Americans, an updated version

== Notes ==
=== Further reading ===
- Weiner S, Hoffert B. Book reviews: Arts & humanities. Library Journal. 1998;123(2):83. Accessed October 21, 2025. https://search.ebscohost.com/login.aspx?direct=true&db=lkh&AN=177869&lang=ru&site=eds-live&scope=site
- Zaleski J. Forecasts: Nonfiction. Publishers Weekly. 1997;244(45):77. Accessed October 21, 2025. https://search.ebscohost.com/login.aspx?direct=true&db=lkh&AN=9711114028&lang=ru&site=eds-live&scope=site
- White RM. Teaching Black history through cartoons. New York Amsterdam News. February 11, 1999. Accessed October 21, 2025. https://search.ebscohost.com/login.aspx?direct=true&db=f6h&AN=1554271&lang=ru&site=eds-live&scope=site
