= Charles R. Johnson =

American writer

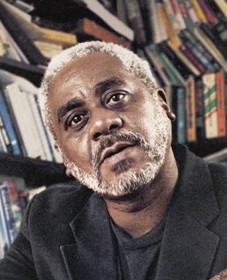
- Johnson in 2013
- Born: April 23, 1948 (age 78); Evanston, Illinois, U.S.
- Education: Southern Illinois University (BS, MA); Stony Brook University (PhD)
- Occupations: Writer; academic; artist; philosopher; scholar of Buddhist and Black American literature

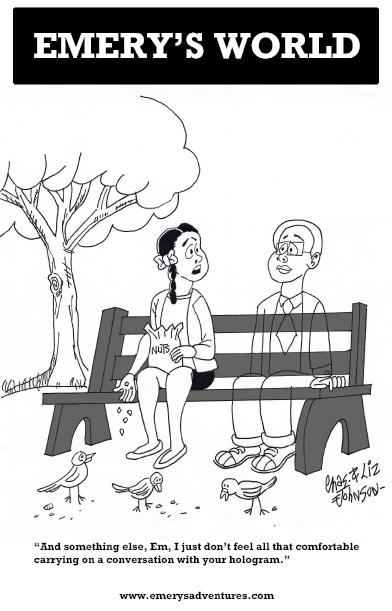
Emery's World

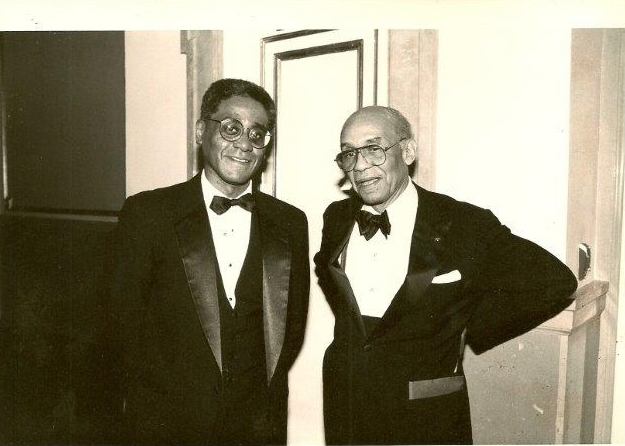
Johnson with Ralph Ellison

Charles Richard Johnson (born April 23, 1948) is an American scholar and the author of novels, short stories, screen-and-teleplays, and essays, most often with a philosophical orientation. Johnson has directly addressed the issues of black life in America in novels such as Dreamer and Middle Passage. Johnson was born in 1948 in Evanston, Illinois, and spent most of his career at the University of Washington in Seattle.

The Cambridge Guide to Literature in English says that Johnson's works "combine historical accuracy, parable, and elements of the fantastic in rendering the experience of African Americans."

== Career ==
=== Political cartooning ===
He first came to prominence in the 1960s as a political cartoonist and illustrator. At the age of 15, he was a student of cartoonist/mystery writer Lawrence Lariar. After a two-year correspondence course with Lariar, Johnson began publishing his artwork professionally in 1965, drawing illustrations for the catalog of a magic company in Chicago, and publishing three stories in his high school's newspaper as well as panel cartoons and a comic strip that in 1966 took two second-place awards in the sports and humor divisions of the Columbia Scholastic Press Association's cartoon contest. He continued drawing and publishing prolifically during his years as an undergraduate journalism major at Southern Illinois University, which in 1977 awarded him the Delta Award "for significant contribution to intellectual commerce of our time" (sponsored by Friends of Morris Library) and an honorary Doctor of Humane Letters in 1995.

In his first career as a cartoonist (1965–72), Johnson churned out hundreds of drawings, comic strips, panel cartoons and illustrations for the student paper The Daily Egyptian, regular editorial cartoons for The Southern Illinoisan, illustrations for the Chicago Tribune, national African-American publications including Black World (formerly Negro Digest), Ebony, and Players, one-page comic book scripts for the now defunct Charlton Comics, and taught cartooning in SIU's "Free School." One of his earliest published articles is "Creating the Political Cartoon," published in Scholastic/Editor/Communications and Graphics (March 1973).

Inspired by a lecture he heard in 1969 by Amiri Baraka (né Leroi Jones), Johnson drew the collection of racial satire titled Black Humor (Chicago: Johnson Publishing Company, 1970). A second collection of political satire appeared in 1972, Half-Past Nation-Time (Aware Press, California).

In 1970, he created, hosted, and co-produced at WSIU-TV Charlie's Pad, an early PBS how-to-draw series broadcast nationally. It consisted of 52, 15-minute lessons in cartooning based on his earlier two years of lessons with Lawrence Lariar. Today, only three episodes of this series have survived.

=== Higher education and early novels ===
Johnson received his B.S. degree in journalism and M.A. in philosophy from Southern Illinois University in 1971 and 1973 and his Ph.D. in philosophy from Stony Brook University in 2000. In 2013, Johnson was awarded by his old philosophy department the first "Don Ihde Distinguished Alumni Award", 78-year-old Ihde being one of America's preeminent phenomenologists, and the director for Johnson's dissertation, Being and Race: Black Writing Since 1970 (1988), a literary manifesto published by Indiana University Press that used the methods of Continental philosophy to examine African-American literature and create an aesthetic position. After writing six of what he calls "apprentice novels" between 1970 and 1972 (one of these was an early draft of Middle Passage), which were not published, Johnson wrote his seventh and first philosophical novel, Faith and the Good Thing, in nine months with his mentor, the late John Gardner, providing him with feedback. This novel was published in 1974 by Viking Press, and Johnson stated then, as he would over the years, that his goal was to contribute to and enrich the tradition of "African-American philosophical fiction". He identified early practitioners of this genre as being Jean Toomer, Richard Wright, and Ralph Ellison.

Early in his writing career, Johnson's mentor was the novelist John Gardner.

=== University of Washington ===
In 1976, Johnson was hired to teach at the University of Washington, Seattle (UW). He received early tenure in three years at UW, then early full professorship after another three years, following the publication of his second novel, Oxherding Tale (1982), a slave narrative steeped in Eastern thought, and referring to the classic 10 Oxherding Pictures of 16th-century artist Kakuan Shien. A student of Buddhism and Eastern thought all his life, as well as a student of Sanskrit since 1998, Johnson took formal vows on November 14, 2007, in the Soto Zen tradition (the 10 Precepts) with mendicant monk Claude AnShin Thomas, author of At Hell's Gate: A Soldier's Journey From War to Peace (2004). Johnson is a contributing writer for Tricycle: The Buddhist Review, and publishes regularly in Shambhala Sun, Buddhadharma: The Practitioner's Quarterly, and has contributed to Turning Wheel: The Journal of Socially Engaged Buddhism. A collection of these writings appeared in Turning the Wheel: Essays on Buddhism and Writing (Scribner, 2003), and was followed in 2014 by a sequel from Shambhala Publications, Taming the Ox: Buddhist Stories, and Reflections on Politics, Race, Culture, and Spiritual Practice.

In 1986, Johnson's first story collection, The Sorcerer's Apprentice was short-listed for the PEN/Faulkner, and he was identified in a survey conducted at UCLA as one of the ten best short story writers in America. His other story collections include Soulcatcher and Other Stories (2001), which were 12 fictions written to dramatize the historical record in the companion book to the PBS series Africans in America, broadcast in 1998 (these are the only stories a writer has been commissioned to do for a history book). His second collection is Dr. King's Refrigerator and Other Bedtime Stories (half of the stories in this collection were written for Humanities Washington's yearly "Bedtime Stories" literary gala). His short stories have appeared in Best American Short Stories (1982, 1995), O. Henry Prize Stories (1993), Playboy Stories: The Best of Forty Years of Short Fiction (1994), Best Buddhist Writing (2006, 2007, 2008), Best Spiritual Writing (2010), and, like his novels, have been translated into several languages like Russian, Italian, Spanish, South Korean, and Chinese. Two of his stories, "Menagerie: A Child's Fable" and "A Soldier for the Crown" were dramatized by actors for National Public Radio's Symphony Space "Selected Shorts."

For the U.S. Information Agency (now the State Department) he has lectured in Germany, Czechoslovakia, Portugal, France, Indonesia, Japan, and Spain.

For 20 years, and after his series Charlie's Pad, Johnson wrote approximately 20 screen and teleplays. The first was Charlie Smith and the Fritter Tree (1978), which was about the at the time the oldest living American, 136-year-old Charlie Smith. With John Allman he shares credit for Booker (1985), a story about the childhood of Booker T. Washington that received a Writers Guild Award for being the "outstanding script in 1985 in the category of Television Children's Shows, and many other awards. In 1981, he served as one of two writer-producers for the second season of the PBS series Up and Coming.

As a book reviewer, he published over 50 book reviews in numerous publications, including The New York Times Book Review, The Wall Street Journal, Washington Post Book World, the Los Angeles Times, The Seattle Times, The Times (London), Tricycle: The Buddhist Review, and Shambhala Sun. For 20 years, between 1978 and 1998, he was fiction editor of the Seattle Review. He has served as a judge for many literary prizes, among them the Pulitzer Prize in fiction (1992, 1995, 2010) and National Book Award in fiction (1988, 1999, and 2009), twice chairing the fiction panel for the latter. He sponsors the Marie Claire Davis Award for a writing student at Evanston Township High School, and the Charles Johnson Fiction Award at Southern Illinois University, a national competition open to all college students.

Johnson has been a practicing martial artist since 1967 when he trained at Chi Tao Chuan of the Monastery in Chicago. Since 1981, he has been a practitioner and sometimes teacher in the Choy Li Fut kung-fu lineage of grandmaster Doc-Fai Wong in San Francisco.

Until his retirement in 2009, Johnson was the S. Wilson and Grace M. Pollock Endowed Professor of English at the University of Washington.

== Awards, acknowledgments, and response ==
Middle Passage won the U.S. National Book Award for Fiction in 1990, making him the first African-American man to receive this prize since Ralph Ellison won in 1953. Johnson's acceptance speech was a tribute to Ellison. Johnson received a MacArthur Fellowship or "Genius Grant" in 1998. He is also the recipient of National Endowment For The Arts and Guggenheim Fellowships, and many other prizes such as a 2002 Academy Award in Literature from the American Academy of Arts and Letters. He was inducted into the American Academy of Arts and Sciences, and his most recent award is The Humanities Washington Award 2013 for creating and contributing for 15 years a new, original short story to a literary event called "Bedtime Stories," which since 1998 has raised a million dollars for the literacy programs of the non-profit organization Humanities Washington.

In 2003, the Charles Johnson Society was inaugurated at the American Literature Association. This is a literary society devoted to scholarly papers and articles on Johnson's work and the genre of philosophical fiction in general. Several literary studies of his work have been published, among these are Charles Johnson's Spiritual Imagination by Jonathan Little (University of Missouri Press, 1997); Charles Johnson's Novels: Writing the American Palimpsest by the late Rudolph P. Byrd (Indiana University Press, 2005); Charles Johnson's Fiction by William R. Nash (University of Illinois Press, 2003); Understanding Charles Johnson, by the late Gary Storhoff (University of South Carolina Press, 2004); Charles Johnson: The Novelist as Philosopher, edited by Marc C. Conner and William R. Nash (University Press of Mississippi, 2007); and Charles Johnson in Context by Linda Furgerson Selzer (University of Massachusetts Press, 2009). After Johnson's retirement from teaching, a festschrift book celebrating the author's work was published in India, Charles Johnson: Embracing the World, edited by Nibir K. Ghosh and American poet E. Ethelbert Miller (Authorspress, 2011).

In the spring of 2021, Chicago Quarterly Review released its "Anthology of Black American Literature", a special issue guest-edited by Johnson.

== Bibliography ==
Fiction

- Faith and the Good Thing (1974)
- Oxherding Tale (1982)
- The Sorcerer's Apprentice (1986)
- Middle Passage (1990)
- Dreamer (1998)
- Soulcatcher and Other Stories (2000)
- Dr. King's Refrigerator: And Other Bedtime Stories (2005)
- The Adventures of Emery Jones, Boy Science Wonder: Bending Time (with Elisheba Johnson, illustrated by Charles Johnson, 2013)
- Night Hawks: Stories (2018)
- Papa Chuck's Twisted Tales (2020)

Philosophy

- Being and Race: Black Writing Since 1970 (1988, ISBN 0-253-31165-9)
- Philosophy: An Innovative Introduction: Fictive Narrative, Primary Texts, and Responsive Writing (with Michael Boylan, 2010)

Non-fiction

- The Way of the Writer: Reflections on the Art and Craft of Storytelling (Scribner, 2016)
- Taming the Ox: Buddhist Stories, and Reflections on Politics, Race, Culture, and Spiritual Practice (Shambhala Publications, 2014)
- Black Men Speaking (with John McCluskey Jr., 1997)
- Africans in America (with Patricia Smith, 1998)
- I Call Myself an Artist: Writings by and about Charles Johnson (edited by Rudolph Byrd, 1999)
- King: The Photobiography of Martin Luther King Jr. (with Bob Adelman, 2000)
- Turning the Wheel: Essays on Buddhism and Writing (2003)
- Passing the Three Gates: Interviews with Charles Johnson (edited by James McWilliams, 2004)
- The Words and Wisdom of Charles Johnson (Dzanc Books, January 2015)
- The Way of the Writer: Reflections on the Art and Craft of Storytelling (Scribner, 2016)
- Grand: A Grandparent's Wisdom for a Happy Life (Hanover Square Press, 2020)

Cartoon Collections

- Black Humor (1970)
- Half-Past Nation Time (1972)
- All Your Racial Problems Will Soon End: The Cartoons of Charles Johnson (2022)
