= Pierre Lévêque =

French historian (1921–2004)

- Born: 11 August 1921; Chambéry, France
- Died: 5 March 2004 (aged 82); Paris, France
- Education: École normale supérieure
- Occupations: Historian, hellenist
- Employer(s): University of Montpellier; University of Franche-Comté
- Notable work: The Birth of Greece; The Greek Adventure: A Cultural and Historical Study of the Ancient Greeks
- Spouse: Monique Clavel-Lévêque
- Children: Laure Lévêque

Pierre Lévêque (French: [pjɛʁ levɛːk]; 11 August 1921, in Chambéry – 5 March 2004, in Paris) was a 20th-century French historian of ancient and Hellenistic Greece.

== Biography ==
=== Training ===
The son of an engineer, he spent his youth in the port of Bordeaux. Reading La Cité grecque by Gustave Glotz, pushed him towards literary studies: he was received in 1940 in the École normale supérieure de la rue d'Ulm then at the agrégation de lettres in 1944. A member of the French School at Athens from 1947 to 1952, he studied in Greece archaic statuary of Delos and excavated the site of Thasos. In 1955, under the direction of André Aymard, he defended his major thesis, dedicated to Pyrrhus of Epirus - the minor one being dedicated to the Athenian poet Agathon, under the direction of Louis Séchan.

== Works (selection) ==
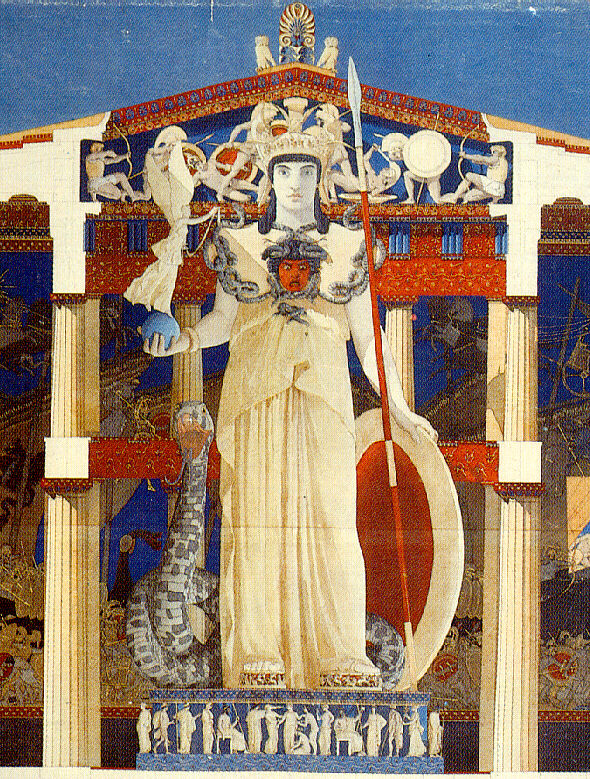
Detail of Parthenon (1880) by Benoît-Édouard Loviot, featured on the cover of The Birth of Greece.

- 1961: Nous partons pour... La Grèce
- 1964: L'aventure grecque
- 1964: Clisthène l'Athénien, 1964 (with Pierre Vidal-Naquet) [Cleisthenes the Athenian: An Essay on the Representation of Space and of Time in Greek Political Thought from the End of the Sixth Century to the Death of Plato, Humanities Press, 1996]
- 1966: Nous partons pour... La Sicile, PUF
- 1966: Pierre Lévêque; Louis Séchan (1966). Les grandes divinités de la Grèce (in French). Éditions E. de Boccard. ISBN 978-2-200-37211-8.
- 1968: Empires et barbaries
- 1985: Bêtes, dieux et hommes
- 1985: Le Japon des mythes anciens
- 1990: La Naissance de la Grèce : Des Rois aux Cités, collection « Découvertes Gallimard » (nº 86), série Histoire. Paris: Gallimard, 176pp., ISBN 2-07-053110-4
  - 1994: The Birth of Greece. “Abrams Discoveries” series. New York: Harry N. Abrams. 1994. ISBN 9780810928435.
  - 1994: Ancient Greece: Utopia and Reality. ‘New Horizons’ series. London: Thames & Hudson. 1994. ISBN 9780500300381.
- 1994: Les Grenouilles dans l'Antiquité
- 2003: Dans les pas des dieux grecs
