= Alicia Girón García =

Spanish librarian (1938–2020)

Alicia Girón García (1938 – 22 February 2020) was a Spanish librarian. She began working in the Madrid public library system in 1969 where she helped plan expansion and digitisation and eventually became its director. From 1983 Girón was deputy director-general of libraries at the Ministry of Culture helping to draft a law mandating library services in settlements with more than 5,000 inhabitants. She later joined the Biblioteca Nacional de España (the national library of Spain), heading its bibliographic processing department and launching a programme to digitise its collection. Girón was appointed director of the library on 24 May 1990, the first woman to hold the position. She remained in post until 9 January 1992, overseeing the reformation of the library as an independent organisation and establishing an interlibrary loan system. Girón later headed the Biblioteca Nacional de Préstamo (national lending library) and the National Newspaper Library before joining the University of Las Palmas de Gran Canaria as director of libraries in 1995. She remained in post until 2008.

== Early career ==
Girón was born in 1938. She had a degree in history and began working in libraries in 1969. Girón initially worked in the Madrid public library system, where she was involved in planning the expansion of library services in the city. In the 1980s she helped to plan a digitisation plan for the Madrid libraries. Girón rose to become director of the Madrid public library system and, from 1983, was deputy director-general of libraries at the Ministry of Culture. She helped to draft laws and regulations including article 26b of Ley de Bases del Régimen Local de 1985 (basic law of local government 1985), which requires settlements with more than 5,000 inhabitants to provide library services. Girón also promoted reading to the general populace and the expansion of school libraries.

== National library ==
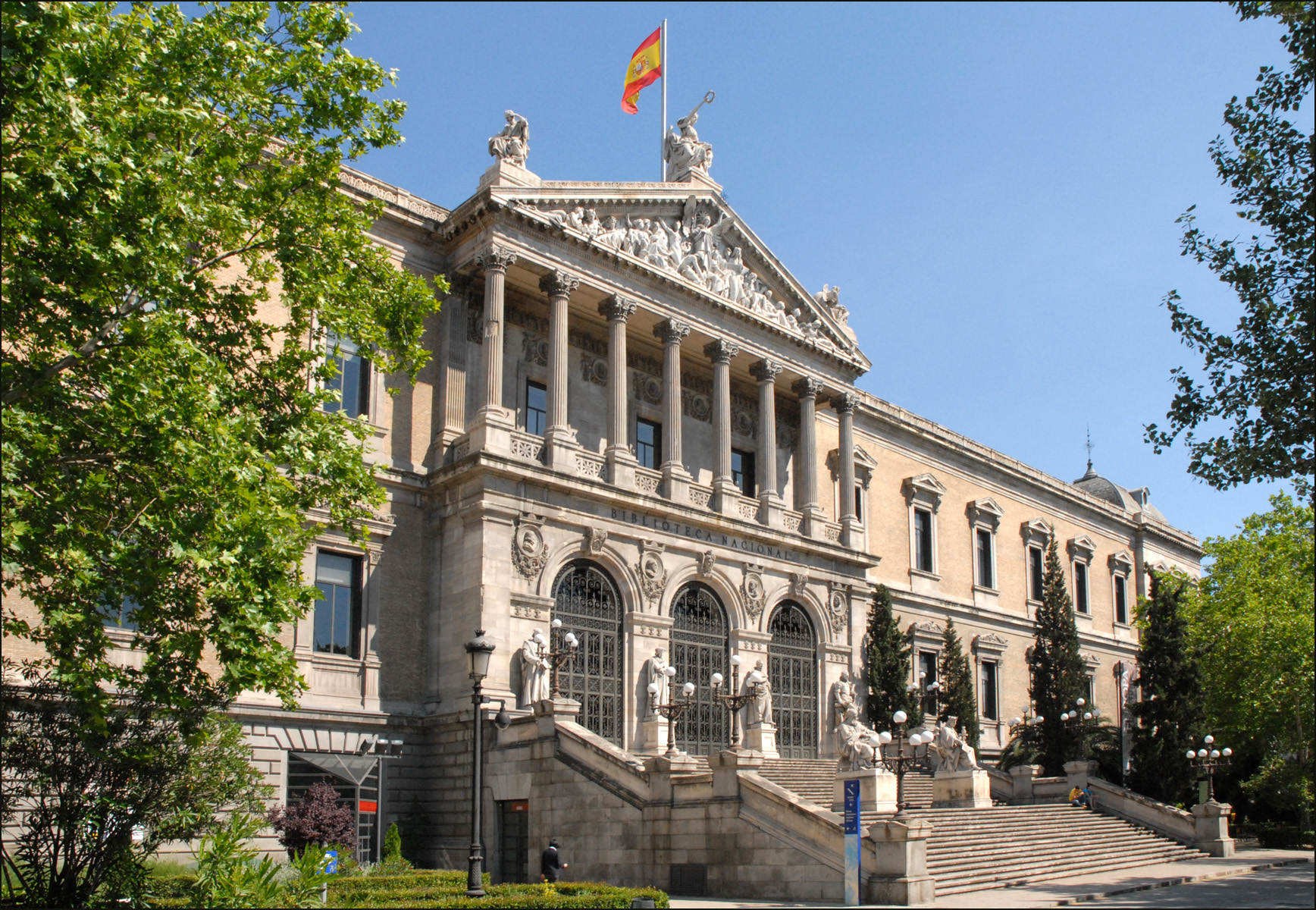
Biblioteca Nacional de España, Madrid

Girón later joined the Biblioteca Nacional de España (the national library of Spain). She was placed at the head of its bibliographic processing department and helped launch its SABINA programme to digitise the collection. On 24 May 1990 she was appointed the first woman director of the library. She remained in post until 9 January 1992. Girón presided over the reformation of the library as an independent organisation from the ministry. She developed the state interlibrary loan system and created the Biblioteca Nacional de Préstamo (national lending library). Other initiatives included organising legal deposit collections for the Spanish autonomous communities, transferring the national library's fine art collection to microfilm and beginning the transfer of pre-20th-century newspapers to microfilm.

== Later career ==
Girón became director of the Biblioteca Nacional de Préstamo and of the National Newspaper Library. She was appointed director of the libraries at the University of Las Palmas de Gran Canaria in 1995 and held this position until 2008. During this time she published numerous research papers and translations. Girón also chaired the Association of Friends of the Library of Alexandria, a UNESCO project with the government of Egypt, and sat on the information and documentation working group of the Spanish national commission for UNESCO. Girón died on 22 February 2020. In October 2021 the University of Las Palmas de Gran Canaria named their general reading room in her honour.
