= Michael Lynch (historian) =

British historian

Michael Lynch, FRHistS, FRSE, FSA Scot (born 15 June 1946) is a retired Scottish historian and a leading expert in the history of the Scottish Reformation and pre-modern urbanisation in the Scottish kingdom. In 2010, five years after his retirement, he was described by one reviewer as 'one of the most influential historians in Scotland of the last thirty years', whose work has been characterised by an 'ability to bring ecclesiastical, cultural and urban perspectives to traditional Scottish political and governmental histories', as well as the ability 'to clarify a difficult theory within a deceptively simple phrase'.

Lynch was born in Aberdeen. He was educated at Aberdeen Grammar School before taking degrees at the University of Aberdeen and the University of London. His first academic post was a lectureship in the history department at University College, Bangor (now Bangor University), from 1971 to 1979. From there he took up a lectureship in the Scottish history department at the University of Edinburgh, where, in 1993, he was appointed Sir William Fraser Professor of Scottish History and Palaeography, holding this Chair—the oldest and most distinguished Scottish history professorship in the world—until his retirement in 2005. As Professor he served as chairman of the Ancient Monuments Board for Scotland (1996–2002), president of the Society of Antiquaries of Scotland (1996–1999), and a trustee of the National Museum of Scotland (2002–2005).

Upon his retirement, Lynch was named an honorary research professor at Edinburgh, and latterly an honorary professorial fellow at the same university.

Lynch is not to be confused with Michael J. Lynch (born 1938), a British historian at the University of Leicester who specializes in Nazi Germany, Mao's China and Stalinist Russia.

== Selected publications ==
Lynch's monographs to date include:

- Edinburgh and the Reformation (1981), winner of the Scottish Arts Council Literary Award
- Scotland: A New History (1991), winner of the Scottish Arts Council Literary Award
- The University of Edinburgh: an illustrated history (2003) (together with R. D. Anderson and N. Phillipson)

Lynch's editorial publications include:

- The Early Modern Town in Scotland (1986)
- The Scottish Medieval Town (1987) (co-editor with M. Spearman and G. Stell)
- Mary Stewart: Queen in Three Kingdoms (1988)
- Scotland, 1850–1979: society, politics and the union (1993)
- The Renaissance in Scotland: studies in literature, religion, history and culture offered to John Durkan (1994) (co-editor with A. A. MacDonald and I. B. Cowan)
- Jacobitism and the '45 (1995)
- Image and identity: the making and re-making of Scotland through the ages (1998) (co-editor with D. Broun and R. J. Finlay)
- The Reign of James VI (2000; 2nd edn 2008) (co-editor with J. Goodare)
- The Challenge to Westminster: sovereignty, devolution and independence (2000) (co-editor with H. T. Dickinson)
- The Oxford Companion to Scottish History (2001)
- Aberdeen before 1800: A New History (2002) (co-editor with E. P. Dennison and D. Ditchburn)
