= Francisco Bravo =

Francisco Bravo was a medical author, the author of the first medical book published in America as far as is known. His Opera Medicinalia etc. (Authore Francisco Brauo Orsunensi doctore Mexicano medico) was published at Mexico, 1570. Three years before, Pedro Arias de Benavides had published his Secretos de Chirurgia, at Valladolid, Spain, and while the latter work is invaluable for the knowledge of Indian medicinal practices, and is the earliest book on these topics known to have been published, the work of Bravo has the merit of being the first medical treatise printed in America.

The first regular physician who came to Mexico appears to have been an Olivarez, although surgeon-barbers and other "healers and curers" are mentioned as having already practiced with Hernán Cortés. Strict medical regulations were established by the municipal council of the city of Mexico in 1527, and extended to the apothecaries in 1529. Although the faculty of medicine at the University of Mexico was not founded until 1578, two "Doctors in Medicine" were received at that institution as early as 1553.

Benavides was a native of Toro, Spain and came to Honduras about the year 1550. Thence he went to Mexico and returned to Spain, after having directed for eight years the hospital "del Amor de Dios" in the city of Mexico. Of Bravo it is only known that he was a native of Osuna, and began to practice at Sevilla in 1553. He came to Mexico between that year and 1570. The date and place of his death are not known.
