= Pedro Téllez-Girón y de la Cueva, 1st Duke of Osuna =

Spanish duke (1537–1590)

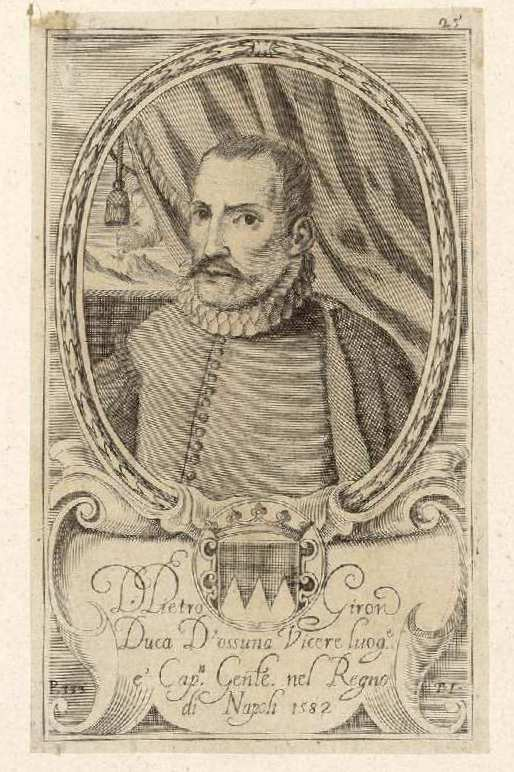
Pedro Téllez Portrait

Pedro Téllez-Girón, 1st Duke of Osuna, 5th count of Ureña (29 July 1537 – 13 September 1590) was a Spanish nobleman and administrator.

Born at Osuna, he was the eldest son of Juan Téllez-Girón, 4th Count of Ureña and of María de la Cueva y Toledo, daughter of Francisco Fernández de la Cueva, 2nd Duke of Alburquerque. He succeeded to his father's titles in 1558 and on 5 February 1562, King Philip II of Spain awarded him the title of Duke of Osuna, together with the subsidiary title of Marquis of Peñafiel for his eldest male descendants. In 1582, he was appointed Viceroy of Naples, a position he held until 1586. He was also Ambassador in Portugal and to the Holy See with Pope Sixtus V.

He was lord of Osuna, Peñafiel, Cazalla de la Sierra, el Arahal, Olvera, Archidona, Morón de la Frontera, Ortejícar, Briones, Tiedra, Gumiel de Izán and others.

In 1552, aged 15, the future duke married Leonor Ana de Guzmán y Aragón (c.1540 – 23 November 1573), daughter of Juan Alfonso Pérez de Guzmán, 6th Duke of Medina Sidonia. Her name has been associated since then to the actual Reserve of the BioSphere known as the Coto de Doñana. Together they had eleven children. On 2 February 1575, he married again, this time his cousin, Isabel de la Cueva y Castilla, with whom he had another two children.

Among his children from the first marriage, he had:

- María Tellez-Girón (1553–1608) married to Juan Fernández de Velasco, 5th Duke of Frías;
- Juan Tellez-Girón y Perez-Guzmán (1554–1600), 2nd Duke of Osuna
- Ana Tellez-Girón (1558–? ), married to Fernando Enriquez, 4th Marquess of Tarifa.

It is reported that being already a Duke he had an illegitimate son, known as the theatrical author Tirso de Molina.

== See also ==
- Tirso de Molina

== Sources ==
- Hobbs, Nicolas (2007). "Grandes de España" (in Spanish). Archived from the original on October 25, 2008.
- Instituto de Salazar y Castro. Elenco de Grandezas y Titulos Nobiliarios Españoles (in Spanish). periodic publication.

Government offices
Preceded by Juan de Zúñiga y Requesens	Viceroy of Naples; 1582–1586	Succeeded by Juan de Zúñiga y Avellaneda
Spanish nobility
New title	Duke of Osuna; 1562–1590	Succeeded by Juan Téllez-Girón
Preceded by Juan Téllez-Girón	Count of Ureña; 1558–1590	Succeeded by Juan Téllez-Girón
