= Osuna =

- Municipality
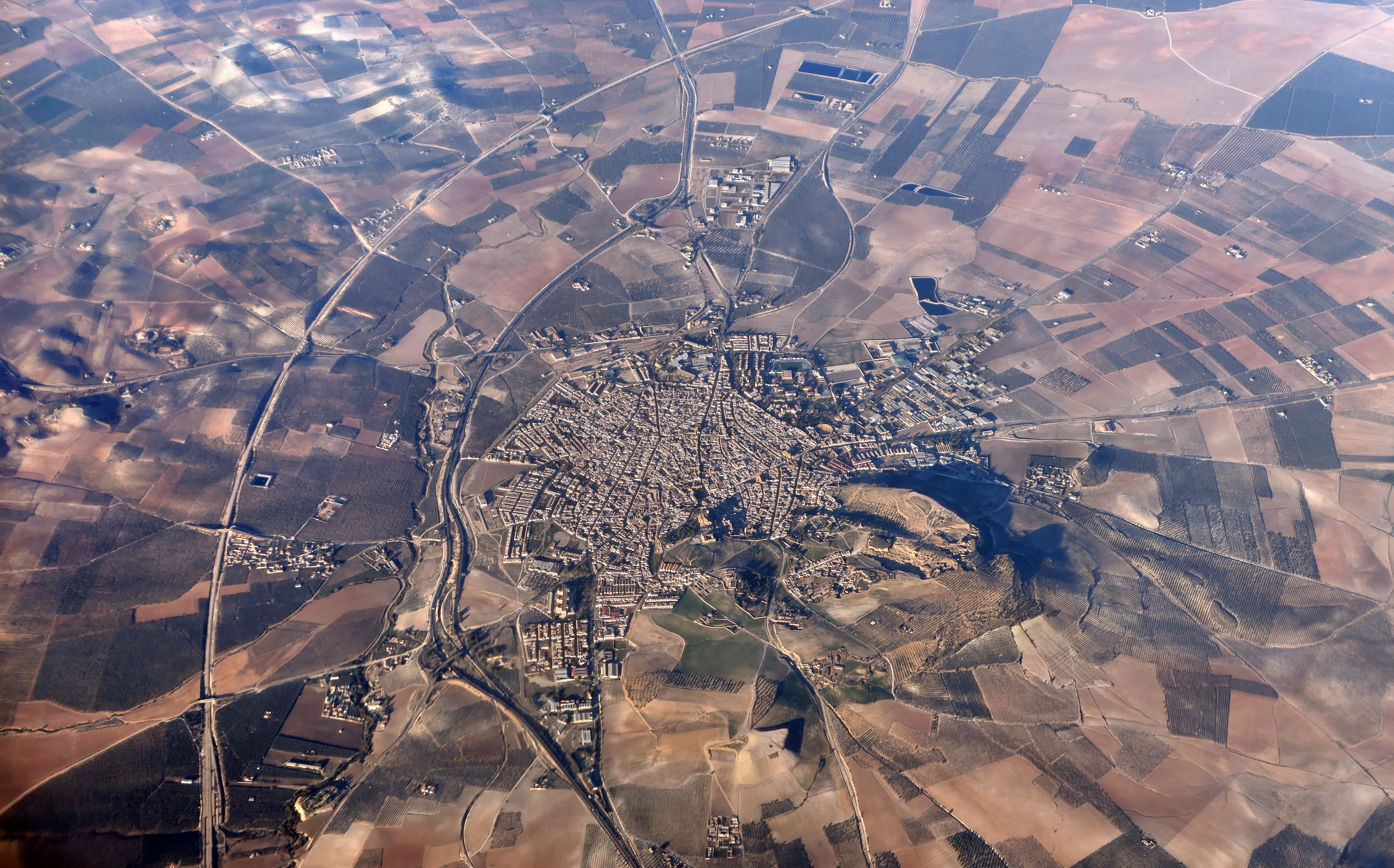
- View of Osuna

- Flag Coat of arms

- Location in Spain
- Coordinates: 37°14′N 05°06′W
- Country: Spain
- Autonomous community: Andalusia
- Province: Seville

Government
  - Mayor: Rosario Andújar Torrejón (PSOE)

Area
  - Total: 592.49 km^{2} (228.76 sq mi)
- Elevation: 328 m (1,076 ft)

Population (2025-01-01)
  - Total: 17,396
  - Density: 29.361/km^{2} (76.044/sq mi)
- Demonym: Ursaonense
- Time zone: UTC+1 (CET)
  - Summer (DST): UTC+2 (CEST)
- Postal code: 41640
- Website: Official website

Osuna (Spanish pronunciation: [oˈsuna]) is a town and municipality in the province of Seville, southern Spain, in the autonomous community of Andalusia. As of 2009, it has a population of c. 17,800. It is the location of the Andalusian Social Economy School.

Osuna is built on a hill, overlooking the fertile plain watered by the Salado, a sub-tributary of the Guadalquivir.

== History ==
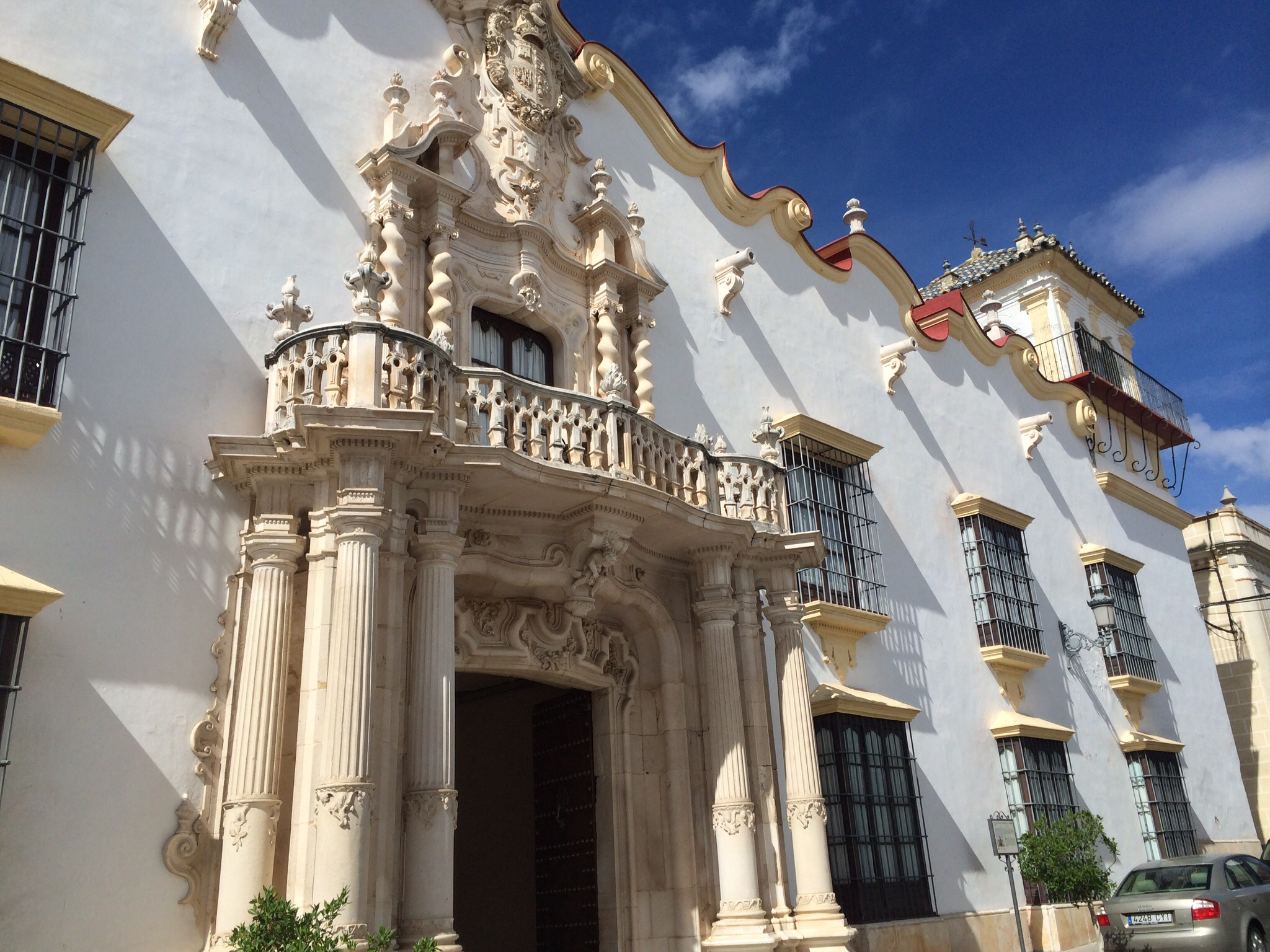
Palace of Marqués de La Gomera

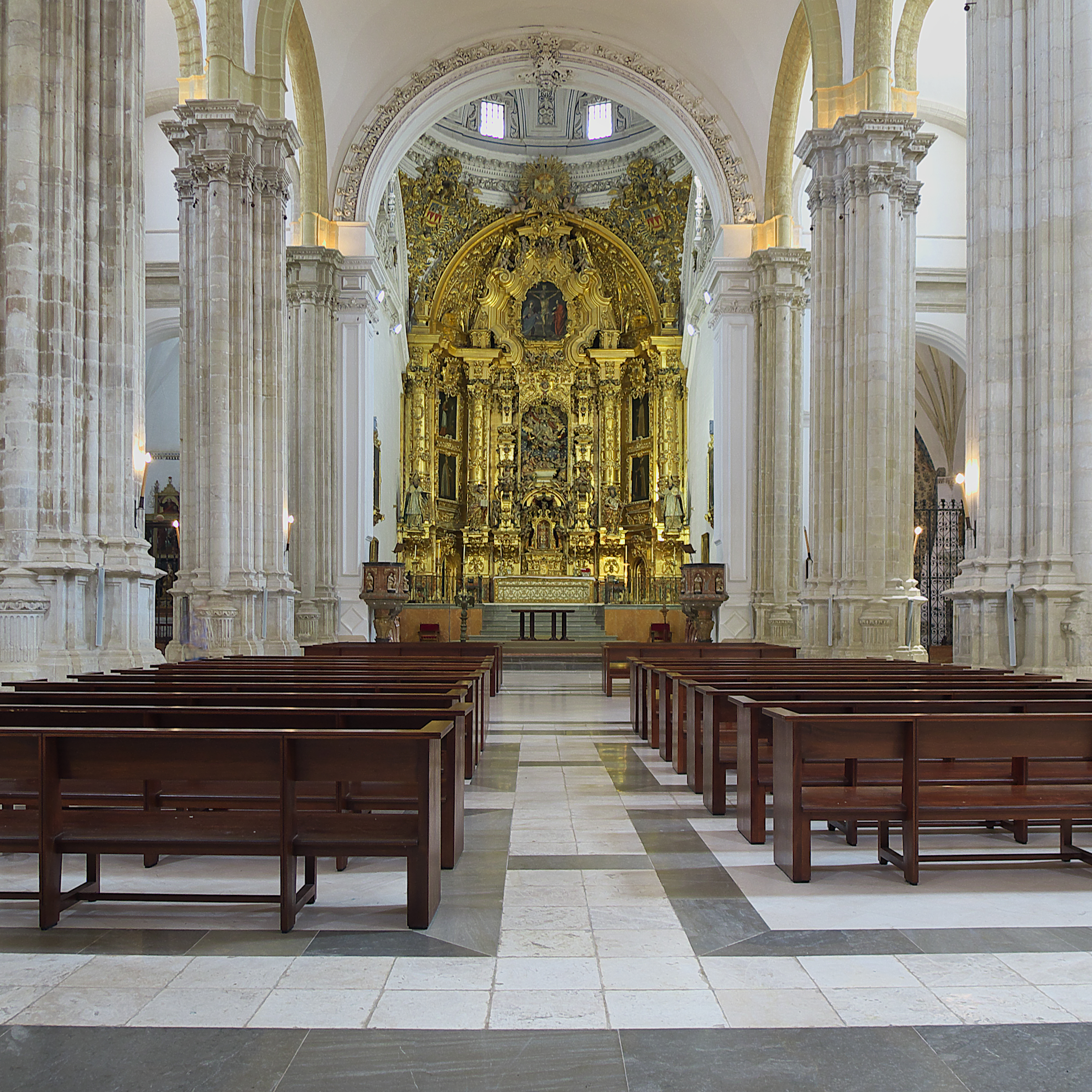
Interior of the Collegiate of Osuna

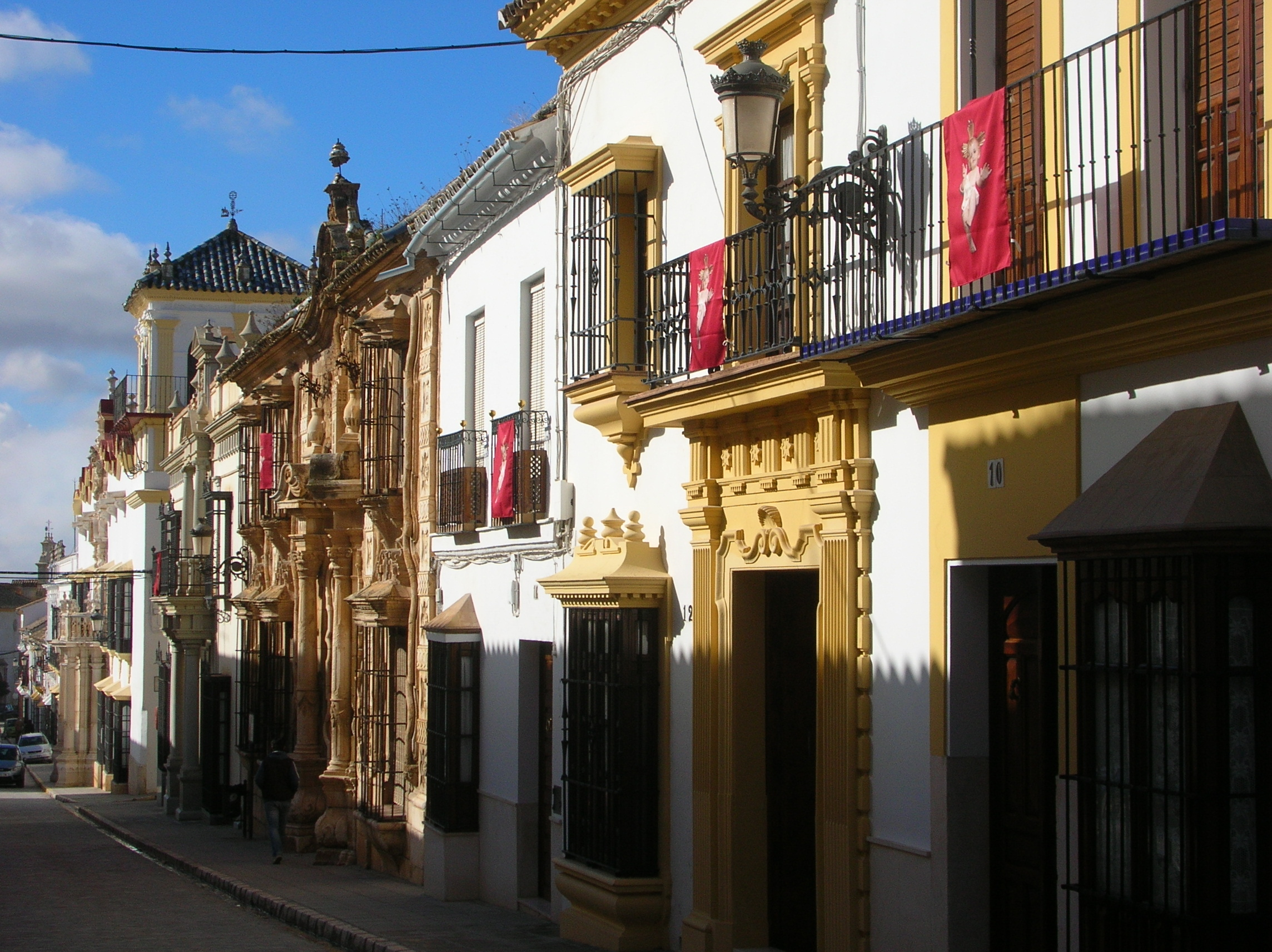
San Pedro street, named as "most beautiful street in Europe" by UNESCO

The battle of Munda, the last battle won by Julius Caesar in person, was probably fought outside Osuna, halfway to Écija near La Lantejuela.

Osuna was taken from the Almohads in 1239, and given by Alphonso X to the Order of Calatrava in 1264. Don Pedro Girón appropriated it to himself in 1445. One of his descendants, Don Pedro Téllez, was the first holder of the title duke of Osuna, conferred on him by Philip II in 1562.

Among famous people associated with Osuna is Juan de Ayala, the commander of the first European ship to enter the San Francisco Bay in California.

The origin of Osuna dates back to about three thousand years ago, when the Turdetans inhabited the city that would later be known as Urso. In the year 44-43 BC. C., fulfilling a previous forecast by Julius Caesar, it was refounded by Mark Antony with veterans of the last civil wars, giving it the status of a colony of Roman citizens and the official name of Colonia Genetiva Iulia, also documented in some inscriptions. Its founding colonial law is preserved, although incomplete, an important bronze inscription on several tables, known as Lex Ursonensis (although the name "Urso" does not appear on it even once), which is kept in the National Archaeological Museum of Madrid. A century later, Pliny the Elder cites it as Colonia Genetiva Urbanorum Urso (NH, III.12).

During the period of Muslim domination it was called Uxuna, being conquered in 1239 by the Castilian armies of Ferdinand III of Castile. In 1264 it was handed over to the Order of Calatrava, which created the Encomienda of Osuna. Due to its strategic location, it became a crucial point for the defense of the border line with the Nasrid kingdom of Granada. In the 15th century, the knights of Calatrava ceded the city of Osuna to Pedro Téllez de Girón, whose descendants received the title of Dukes of Osuna during the reign of Philip II.

Osuna experienced its moment of greatest splendor in the mid-16th century with the figure of Juan Téllez Girón, IV Count of Ureña, born in Osuna around 1494. He is a character, halfway between the Middle Ages and the Renaissance. Over the course of thirty years he created the largest and most dazzling monumental complex of the Sevillian Renaissance in the city of Osuna, with the construction of thirteen churches and convents, a hospital, the University, the Collegiate Church and the Ducal Sepulchre, which made him the patron most important of his time.

== Climate ==
Osuna is characterized by having a mediterranean climate (Csa in Köppen climate classification). Summers are very hot and dry, while winters are mild and has moderate precipitation. Winter nights are particularly cool, but temperatures rarely drop below 0 °C (32 °F), while summer nights tend to be warm, sometimes quite hot during heat waves.

Climate data for Osuna (2009-2025), extremes (2009-present)
Month	Jan	Feb	Mar	Apr	May	Jun	Jul	Aug	Sep	Oct	Nov	Dec	Year
Record high °C (°F)	25.9 (78.6)	25.6 (78.1)	30.5 (86.9)	36.8 (98.2)	38.3 (100.9)	42.1 (107.8)	45.4 (113.7)	45.4 (113.7)	43.8 (110.8)	35.4 (95.7)	29.1 (84.4)	24.9 (76.8)	45.4 (113.7)
Mean daily maximum °C (°F)	14.8 (58.6)	16.4 (61.5)	18.8 (65.8)	22.1 (71.8)	27.1 (80.8)	31.6 (88.9)	35.8 (96.4)	35.8 (96.4)	30.4 (86.7)	25.8 (78.4)	18.8 (65.8)	16.2 (61.2)	24.5 (76.0)
Daily mean °C (°F)	11.2 (52.2)	12.4 (54.3)	14.5 (58.1)	17.4 (63.3)	21.6 (70.9)	25.6 (78.1)	29.1 (84.4)	29.4 (84.9)	25.0 (77.0)	21.3 (70.3)	15.1 (59.2)	12.7 (54.9)	19.6 (67.3)
Mean daily minimum °C (°F)	7.6 (45.7)	8.4 (47.1)	10.2 (50.4)	12.7 (54.9)	16.0 (60.8)	19.5 (67.1)	22.3 (72.1)	23.0 (73.4)	19.6 (67.3)	16.7 (62.1)	11.3 (52.3)	9.1 (48.4)	14.7 (58.5)
Record low °C (°F)	−1.1 (30.0)	−2.1 (28.2)	2.2 (36.0)	4.6 (40.3)	7.7 (45.9)	11.6 (52.9)	15.9 (60.6)	16.0 (60.8)	13.1 (55.6)	5.5 (41.9)	1.3 (34.3)	0.5 (32.9)	−2.1 (28.2)
Average precipitation mm (inches)	48.6 (1.91)	43.4 (1.71)	77.8 (3.06)	41.6 (1.64)	23.1 (0.91)	6.4 (0.25)	0.3 (0.01)	3.7 (0.15)	19.3 (0.76)	55.0 (2.17)	70.3 (2.77)	57.1 (2.25)	446.6 (17.59)
Source: Agencia Estatal de Meteorología (AEMET OpenData)

== Sights ==
On the top of the hill stands the collegiate church, dating from 1534 and containing interesting Spanish and early German paintings. These, however, as well as the sculptures over the portal, suffered considerably during the occupation of the place by the French under Marshal Soult. The vaults, which are supported by Moorish arches, contain the tombs of the Girón family, and the church was founded by Don Juan Téllez.

The university of Osuna, also founded by Don Juan Téllez in 1549, was suppressed in 1820.

== In popular culture ==
In Michelangelo Antonioni's film, The Passenger, the character Locke (played by Jack Nicholson) is assassinated in a hotel set in Osuna (Hotel de la Gloria), although actually filmed in Vera (Almería), Spain.

In 2014, parts of the fifth season of HBO's Game of Thrones were filmed in the town.

== See also ==
- Duke of Osuna
- Turdetani
- University of Osuna
- Collegiate Church of Osuna
- List of municipalities in Seville
