= Lex Ursonensis =

Ancient Roman law

- Ley de Urso
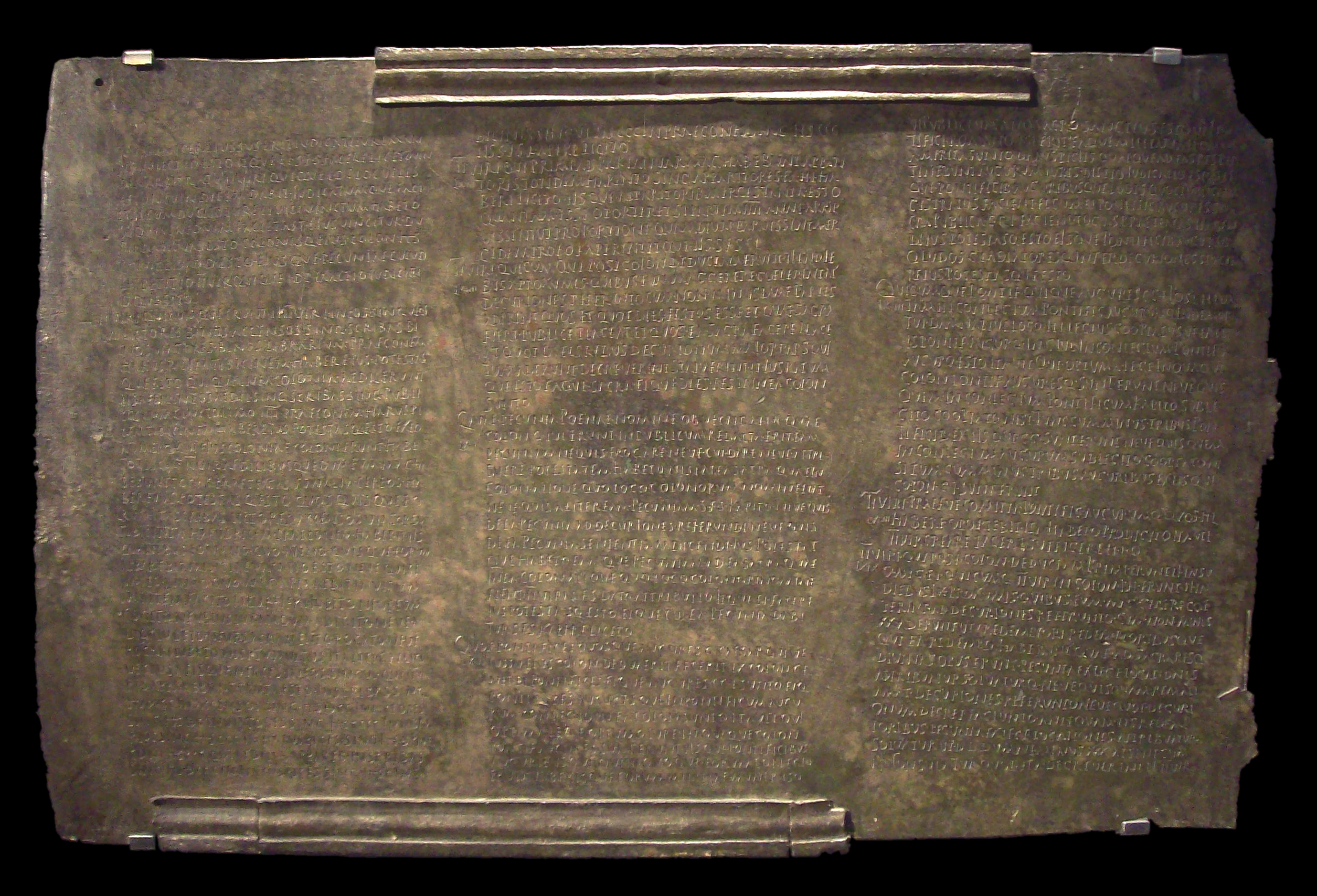
- Epigraphy, legal slab
- Material: Bronze
- Length: 92.20 cm
- Height: 59 cm
- Width: 3 cm
- Created: 1st century CE
- Period/culture: Roman Empire
- Discovered: 1870-75; Urso, Osuna, Seville
- Present location: National Archaeological Museum (Madrid)
- Registration: 16736

The Lex Ursonensis is the foundation charter of the Caesarean colonia Iulia Genetiva at Urso near Osuna (province of Seville, Andalusia) in southern Spain. A copy of its text was inscribed on bronze under the Flavians, portions of which were discovered in 1870/71. The original law spanned nine tablets with three or five columns of text each and comprised over 140 sections (rubricae). Of these four tablets survive, including sections 61-82, 91-106 and 123-134. Remains are kept in the National Archaeological Museum of Spain, in Madrid.

The charter was approved by the Roman assembly as a law proposed probably by Mark Antony after the assassination of Julius Caesar.

== Historical context ==
After the battles between Caesar and Pompey during the Republican period, Caesar decided to establish in Osuna a colony of citizens named Genetiva Iulia in honor of the goddess Venus Genetrix, the protector of the gens Iulia, to which Caesar himself belonged.

== Laws of colonies and municipalities ==
In Hispania, there were two fundamental laws:

- The Law of Urso, of colonial character.
- The Lex Flavia Municipalis, a type of municipal law, an example of which could be the Lex Flavia Malacitana.

The laws that regulated colonies and municipalities were known as "leges datae," meaning they were given directly by a magistrate authorized by the assemblies based on a comitial law. Even though other laws from outside Hispania have been preserved, it can be asserted that the texts found in the Iberian Peninsula are a fundamental source for understanding the vast phenomenon of provincial legal Romanization.

== Stages of drafting the Lex Ursonensis ==
- 1. Drafting of the project by Caesar.
- 2. The issuance (datio) of the law by Marcus Antonius.
- 3. The physical engraving on the bronze tablets of Osuna.

The bronze tablets are a later reissue of the original text by Marcus Antonius, dating from the last third of the 1st century AD, with the peculiarity that the entire text is interpolated. While it's challenging to specify the origin and timing of the interpolations, it is believed that Marcus Antonius might have already modified Caesar's project; however, it's also possible that other interpolations were made later.

Of the Law of Urso, a little over 50 chapters are currently preserved out of the 142 that it is believed to have contained.

== Provisions ==
The law addresses a wide range of local governance issues:

- Magistrates
- Officials
- Colony revenues: Public rentals (Vectigalia), fines for non-payments, etc.
- Priestly colleges of pontiffs and augurs
- Procedural order
- Public works:
  - Sanitation systems
  - Roads and paths
  - Maintenance of public waters
  - Land distribution
- Internal policing
- Military defense
- Road regulations
- Funeral rites

== See also ==
- Romanization of Hispania
- Hispania

== Bibliography ==
- Caballos Rufino, Antonio (2006). El nuevo bronce de Osuna y la politica colonizadora romana. Sevilla, ISBN 84-472-1049-9.
- M. H. Crawford (1996). Roman Statutes. pp. no.25 (with text, English translation and commentary).
- J. González, ed. (1989). Estudios sobre Urso: La colonia Iulia Genetiva.
- Amores Carredano, Fernando; Beltrán Fortes, José; Fernández Lacomba, Juan (2008). El rescate de la Antigüedad clásica en Andalucía. Fundación Focus-Abengoa. ISBN 978-84-89895-20-1.
