= Colegiata de Nuestra Señora de la Asunción =

Catholic church in Osuna, Andalusia, Spain

Coordinates: 37.2392°N 5.1003°W

The Colegiata de Nuestra Señora de la Asunción (Spanish for 'Collegiate Church of Saint Mary of the Assumption') is a Catholic church built in the sixteenth century in the town of Osuna, in Andalusia, Spain. It was founded by Juan Téllez-Girón, 4th Count of Ureña. It was declared Bien de Interés Cultural (Good of Cultural Interest) in 1931.

The interior contains a nave and two aisles, five chapels, and a presbytery. The interior of the church is richly decorated in Renaissance style. It has a Baroque main altar, constructed in the eighteenth century, and the chapels on the sides are all very attractive. In the interior, the huge sacristy is now a museum that exhibits a collection of five paintings by José de Ribera (El Españoleto) and a carving by Juan de Mesa.

On the lower level is the Pantheon of Dukes, which was built in the Plateresque style in 1545 and contains a small chapel with an altarpiece attributed to Roque Balduque, a painting of Hernando de Esturmio, and the tombs of the Dukes of Osuna.

Pantheon of Duke of Osuna and sacristy

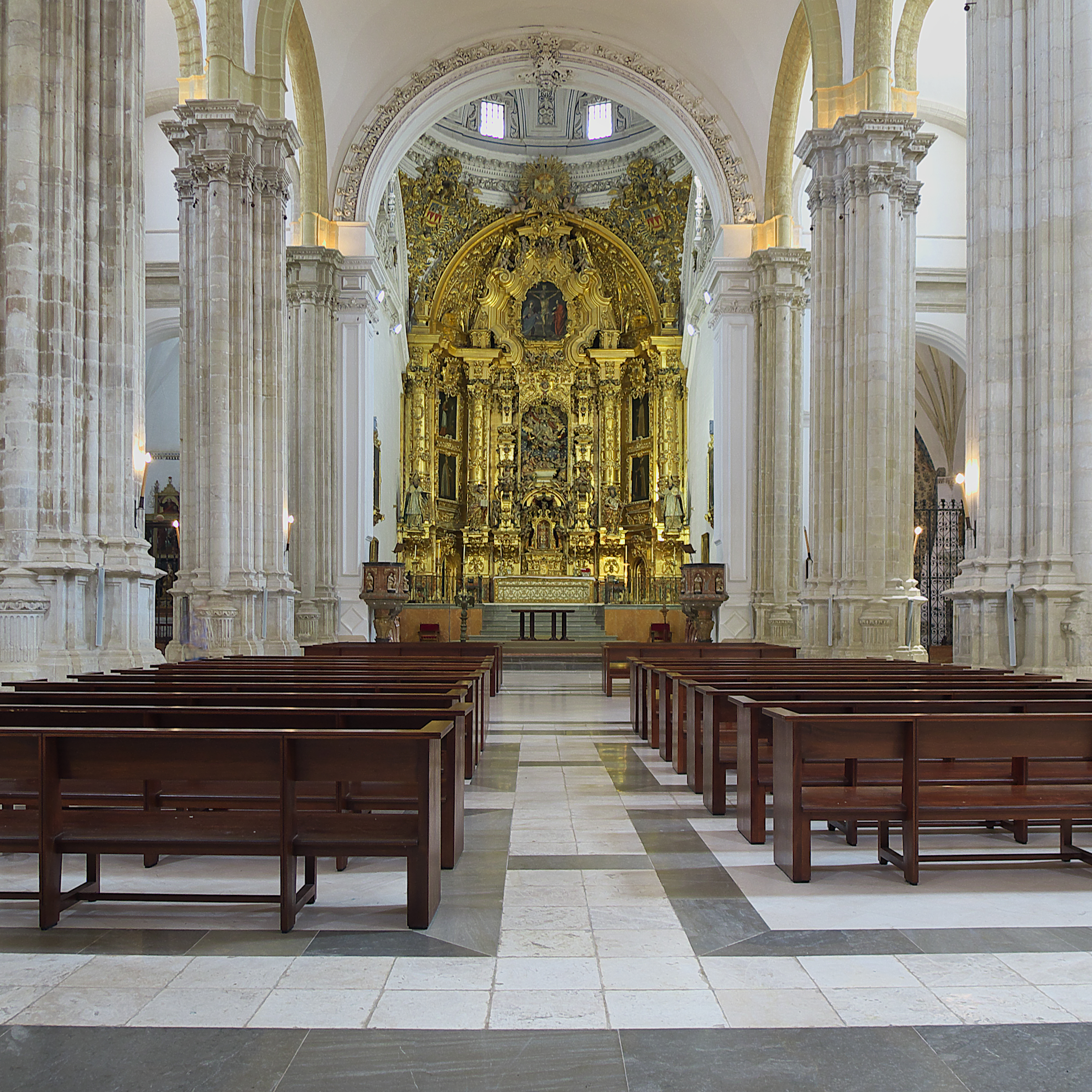
Interior of Collegiate Church of Osuna

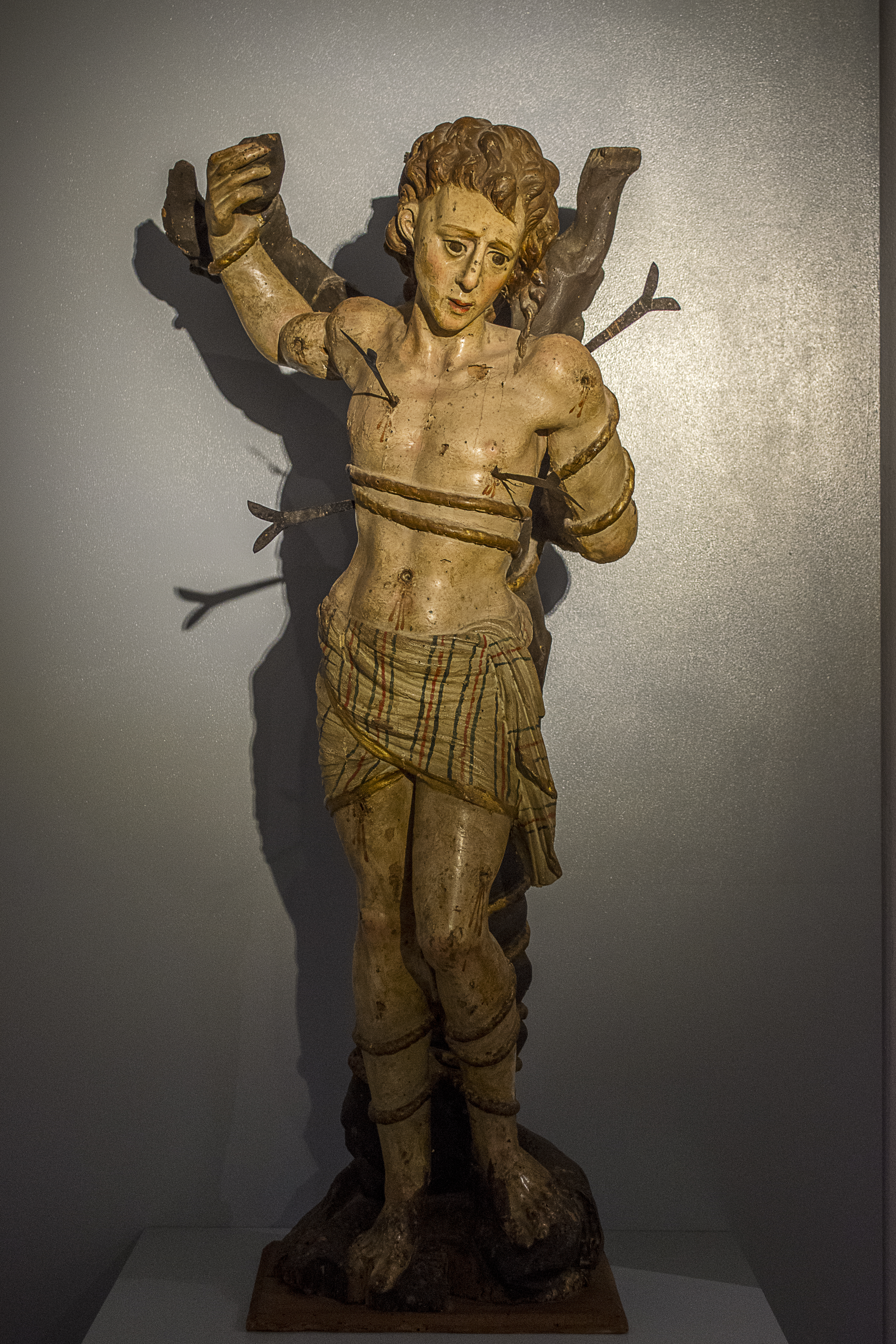
Sculpture of Saint Sebastian.

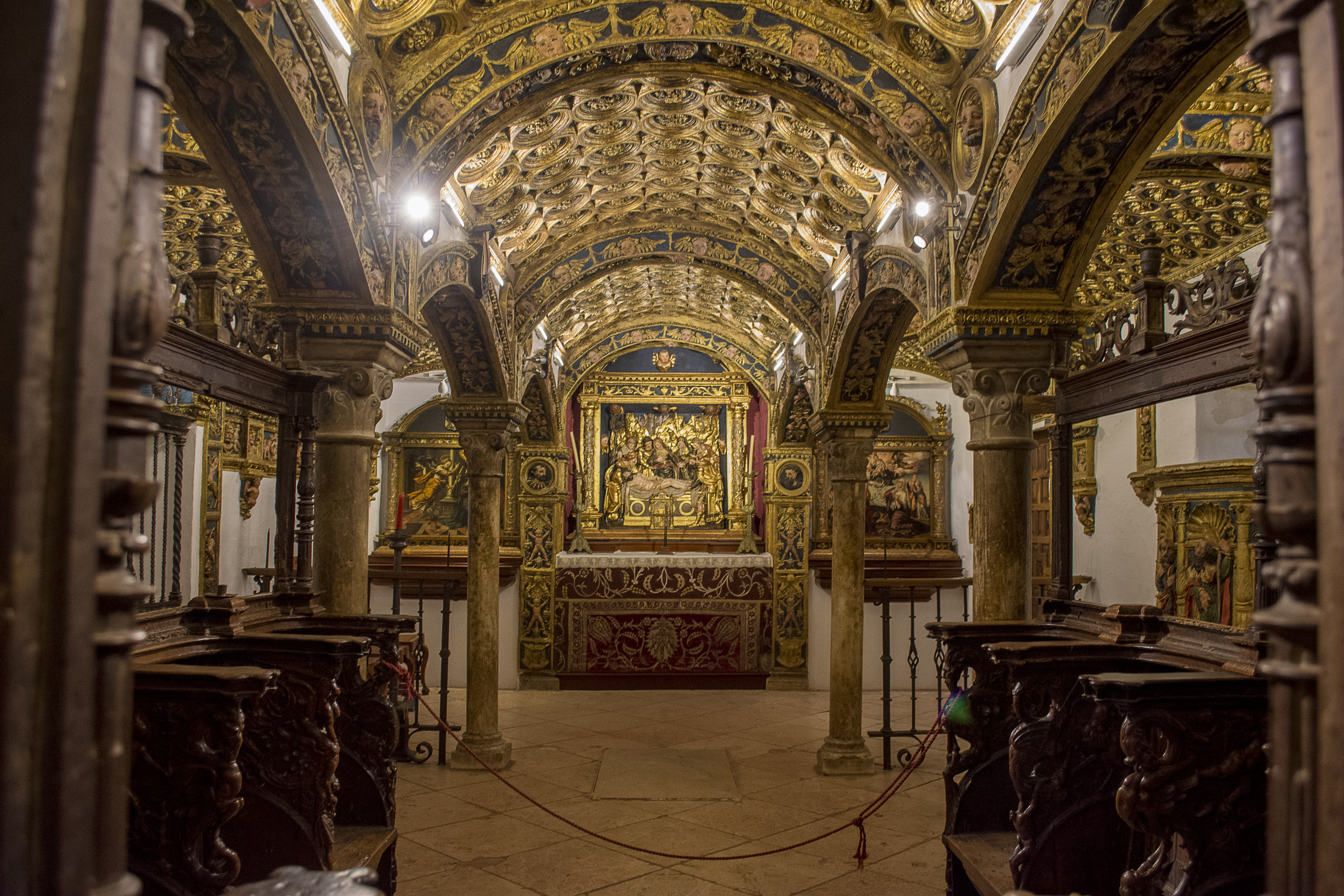
Chapel of del pantehon.

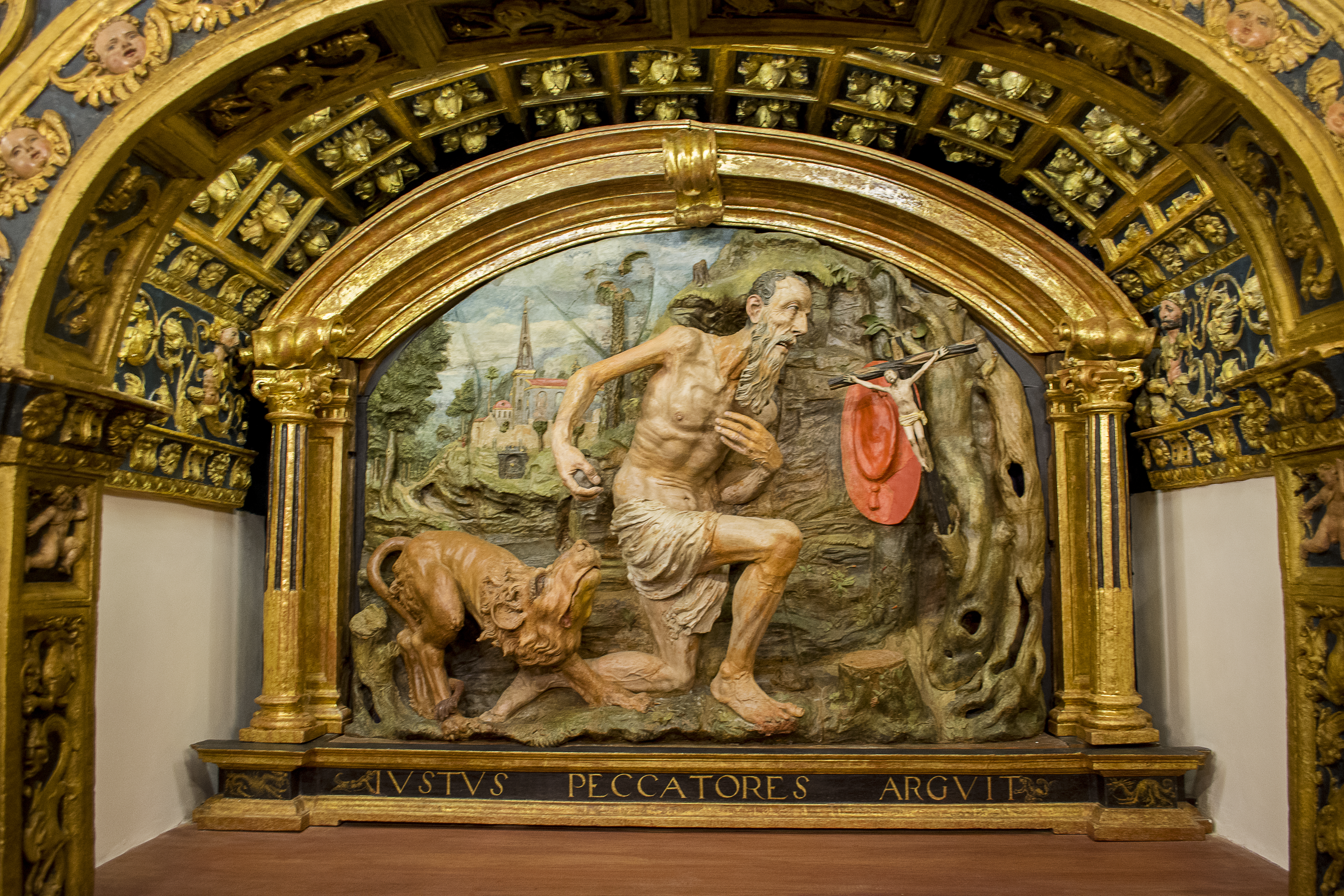
Relief of Saint Jerome.

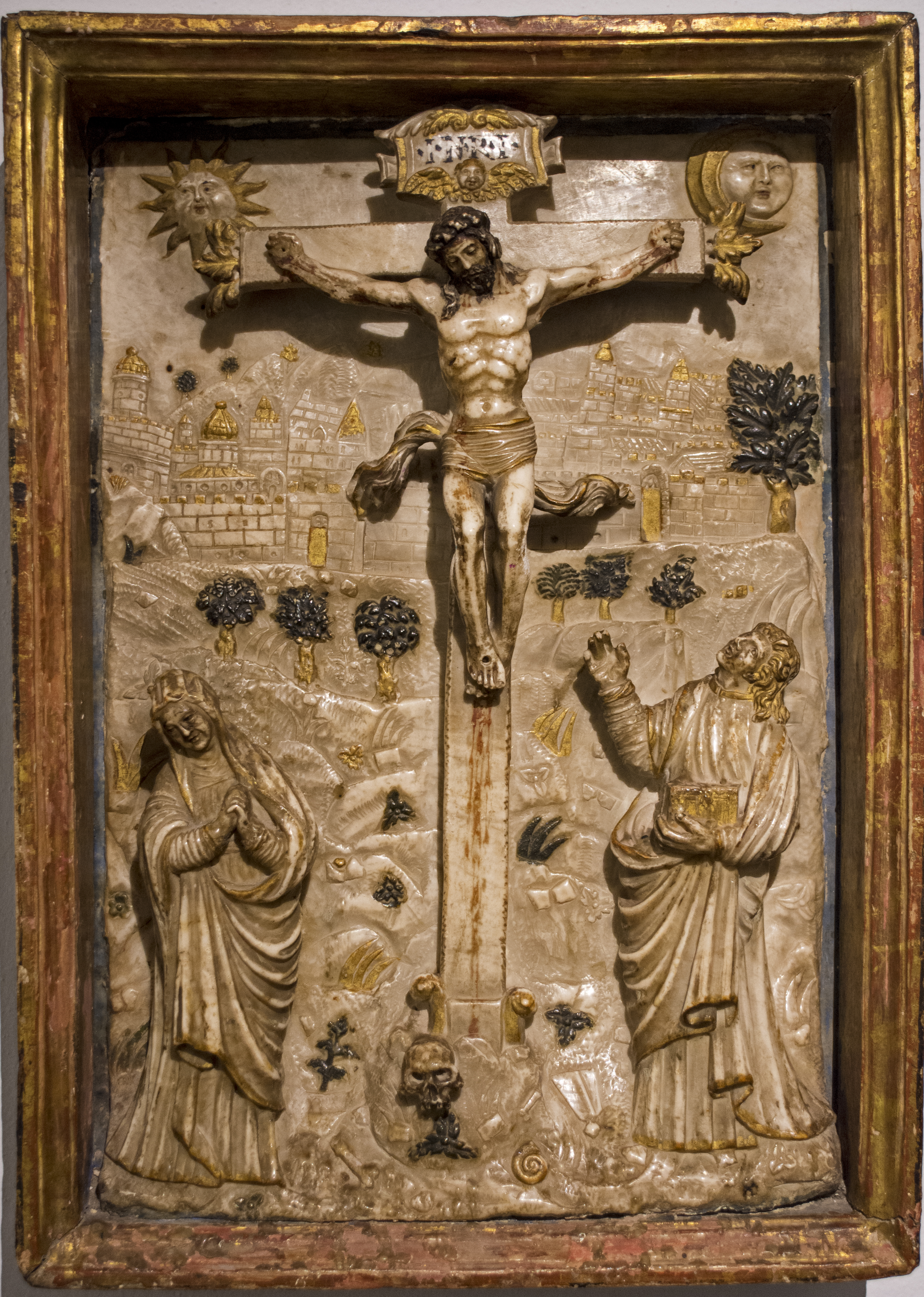
Alabaster relief

== Filming ==
Some of the scenes from Game of Thrones (season 5) were filmed in the Collegiate Church of Osuna in October 2014.
