= Juan Téllez-Girón y Velasco, 4th Count of Ureña =

Spanish nobleman

Juan Téllez-Girón, the saint, 4th Count of Ureña (in full, Spanish: Don Juan Téllez-Girón y Fernández de Velasco, el Santo, cuarto conde de Ureña, señor de la villa de Osuna, de Cazalla de la Sierra, Morón de la Frontera, El Arahal, Olvera, Archidona, Peñafiel, Ortejicar, Briones, Tiedra, Gumiel de Izán, Frechilla y Gelves, Camarero mayor y del Consejo de Carlos V) (25 April 1494 – 19 May 1558) was a Spanish nobleman.

Juan Téllez-Girón was born in Osuna, the third son of Juan Téllez-Girón, 2nd Count of Ureña and of Leonor de la Vega Velasco, daughter of Pedro Fernández de Velasco, 2nd Count of Haro. He succeeded to the titles of his older brother in 1531. He married María de la Cueva y Toledo, daughter of Francisco Fernández de la Cueva, 2nd Duke of Alburquerque and they had 6 children.

In 1549, he founded a College and University in Osuna. He was nicknamed the saint because he also created a Franciscan and Dominican monasteries in his Osuna domains.

== See also ==
- Collegiate Church of Osuna

== Sources ==
- Hobbs, Nicolas (2007). "Grandes de España" (in Spanish).
- Instituto de Salazar y Castro. Elenco de Grandezas y Titulos Nobiliarios Españoles (in Spanish). periodic publication.

Spanish nobility
| Preceded by Pedro Girón | Count of Ureña; 1531–1558 | Succeeded by Pedro Girón |
