= University of Osuna =

University in Osuna, Kingdom of Seville, Spain

Coordinates: 37.237614°N 5.0994875°W

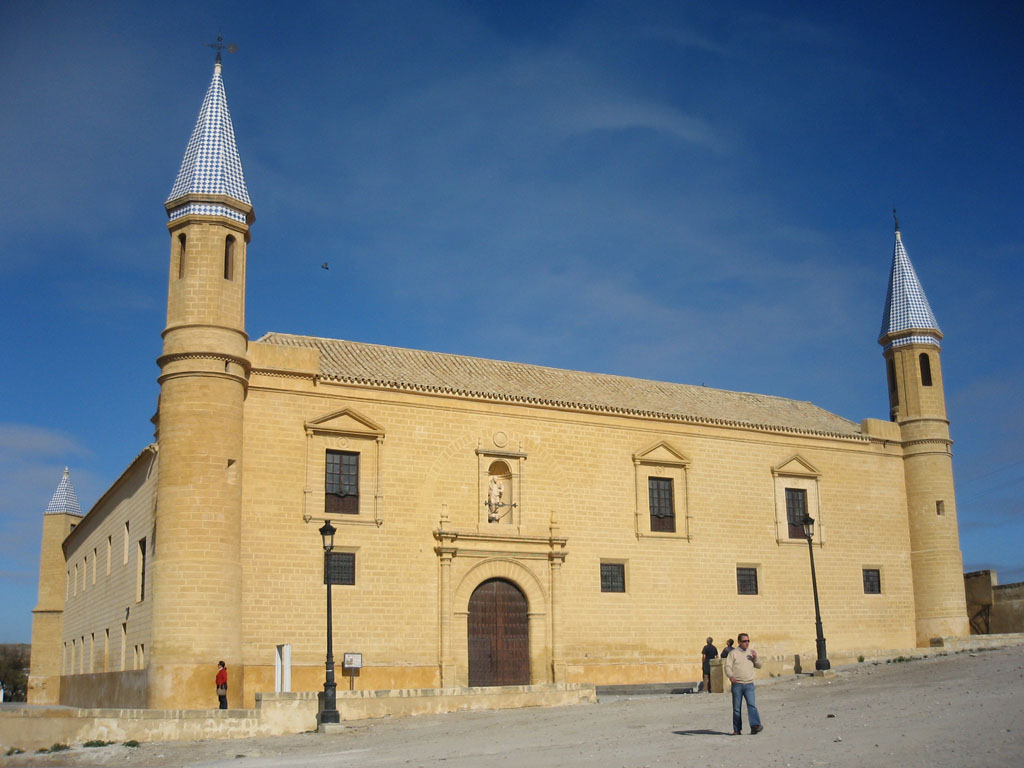
University of Osuna

The University of Osuna (Spanish: Universidad de Osuna), officially the Colegio-Universidad de la Purísima Concepción en Osuna ("College-University of the Immaculate Conception in Osuna") was a university in Osuna, Kingdom of Seville, Spain from 1548 until 1824. Spain granted the university building the status of a monument in 2004. Since 1995, the building has again been a site for university-level studies.

== The old university ==
The University of Osuna was founded based on a bull of Pope Paul III, and it was a peer university to the likes of the universities of Alcalá de Henares, Bologna, or Salamanca. That bull was granted due to the efforts of Don Juan Téllez Girón, Fourth Count of Ureña and First Duke of Osuna, who also gave it an endowment sufficient to its needs. Authorization for the university came directly from the pope without any specific involvement of the Spanish monarchy.

The University of Osuna had a system of scholarships, a residential hall for its students, and even its own burial ground. There were fifteen major professorial chairs in the university and eight lesser chairs in the associated college; these were grouped into faculties of Medicine, Law, Canon Law, Theology, and Arts. Of these, Theology was the most attended. Medical instruction was entirely theoretical: there was no operating theater. Philip II later added a chair in Mathematics.

The first rector was Francisco Maldonado; the last was Diego Ramirez. Dominicans, Augustinians, Franciscans, and Carmelites all taught at the university.

While one could get an excellent education at the old University of Osuna, one could also drift through, attend classes in a desultory manner, and add an academic degree to his name, as long as the fees were paid (supplemented by "propinas", tips, if one's academic performance were truly poor). Osuna was not unique among Spanish universities of its time in this respect, but it was often singled out as an example. Cervantes, whose grandfather served as corregidor of Osuna, mentions the university three times in his writings, never favorably. Writing a century and a half later, Diego de Torres Villarroel, a professor at the University of Salamanca, described the granting of degrees by the University of Osuna, as well as at the universities of Sigüenza and Irache, as amounting to "civil simony".

Partly for these reasons, the University of Osuna narrowly escaped closure by Charles III in 1771 and was one of eleven universities closed in the reform of 1807. Its prerogatives were granted to the University of Seville. The university did not quite close down at this time, though its operations do seem to have been suspended when the building was used as a French headquarters during the Peninsular War. After the war, the university continued precariously until its definitive closure in 1824.

=== Student body ===
There were three types of students at the university: colegiales, sopistas, and manteístas.

As elsewhere in Spain in that era, the privileged colegiales were a social class apart, a student elite guaranteed housing and food, and virtually guaranteed a more or less brilliant future. At its establishment, Osuna set aside funding for twenty colegiales: six in theology, six in canon law, four in civil law, and four in medicine. This number proved excessively ambitious: neither the University of Seville nor the University of Granada ever hosted so many colegiales, and, in practice, neither did Osuna: the largest number ever at one time was eight, in 1596.

Positions were also endowed for 36 sopistas or capigorrones (the names mean, respectively, "eaters of thin soup" and "layabouts"), 12 each in grammar, arts, theology. These positions—again, as in other Spanish universities of the time—were reserved for poor young men of ability; they received a modest scholarship and their bread and board. It is not known how many sopistas actually attended the university, though there is a building near the university that tradition says was the "soup house" where they took meals. The degree of their poverty can be ascertained in part from a specific provision to supply them with shoes. These positions were set aside not so much to aid social mobility as because these graduates often reflected so well on the university. Their cuchara al cinturón ("spoon on the belt") remains a symbol of the tuna (a type of student troubadour) down to this day.

Finally, there were the ordinary students, the manteístas ("day students"). Some of these were natives of Osuna or nearby towns under the seigneury of the same duke, and lived with their families or in rented rooms. The majority had taken religious orders and lived in their convents. The records show the rectors of the university having to involve themselves in numerous cases where a manteísta failed to pay his rent, and no small number of manteístas impregnated a housemaid and took religious orders as an alternative to taking on other responsibilities.

As elsewhere in Spain, students were often disorderly: street riots were not uncommon, especially among those who were living in poverty to the point of hunger. In many cases, the student class could not be distinguished readily from that of vagrants, beggars, and thieves. Such conduct by some of the students often made the studies of the more responsible students difficult. In 1782, the rector reminded the students to "abstain from throwing rocks, both inside and outside the university; from doing damage to the doors and buildings; from defacing the walls..."

=== Notable graduates ===
- Joseph Blanco White (José María Blanco White), poet, theologian.
- Rodrigo Caro, poet, historian, archeologist, and lawyer.
- Luís Vélez de Guevara, novelist and playwright, graduated in 1596

== The present university ==
In 1995 the city of Osuna began the adaptation of the old university building for modern university-level classes. The Escuela Universitaria opened for the academic year 1996–97. As of 1999, the university was granting diplomas in Labor Relations, Business, and Health Sciences.

== The building ==
=== Significance ===
The building of the former University of Osuna is significant both architecturally and for its long history as a seat of the university from its construction in 1548 to its closure in 1824. Its construction was ordered by Don Juan Téllez Girón, founder of the university. The First Duke of Osuna was responsible for numerous buildings in his domain, nearly all of a religious character. The university building is, therefore, particularly notable as an essentially civil building devoted to education.

The buildings erected under the patronage of the First Duke of Osuna are important primarily because of the adoption and diffusion of new stylistic currents and ideas from the Italian architecture of the time. The Renaissance aspects of the buildings are patent, as is the relation to the ideology of humanism in a building expressly created as a center for modern education.

The surviving university building testifies to the Renaissance aesthetics, providing one of the most defining architectural examples of Osuna.

=== Exterior ===
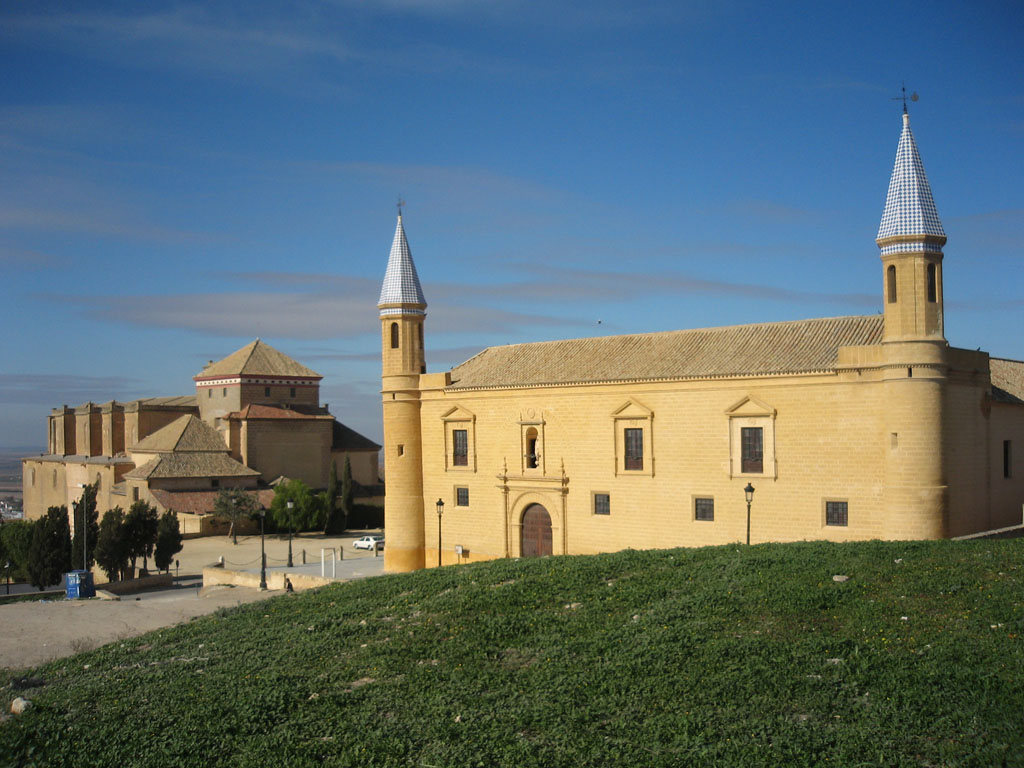
The University building. In the background is La Colegiata: the Iglesia Colegial de Nuestra Señora de la Asunción ("College Church of Our Lady of the Assumption").

The former University of Osuna is a rectangular two-story building organized around a square courtyard. Its architectural design is characterized by simplicity and severity of its straight lines. Its unique profile, having a tower at each of its four corners, each tower topped by a spire with a glazed ceramic coating, makes it one of the most emblematic buildings of the city.

The four exterior walls are of stone. Several rectangular linteled openings are placed symmetrically. The towers at the two corners in front are cylindrical. The cylinders each extend a full story above the building, and then are covered by polygonal spires. The other two towers, in the rear, are square, in the style of buttresses; they extend to the same height as those in front, and their spires are pyramidal. The glazed ceramic coatings of the spires is in blue and white.

The principal façade faces southeast, and is ornamented ashlar stonework. On the right half of the upper story are two linteled window bays, flanked by half-columns, with a pediment above. The principal entrance, which gives access to the interior, is to the left of center. For roughly two thirds of its height, the door is flanked by columns, over which there is a semicircular arch. That entire assemblage is finished at the outer edge with molding, flanked on both sides by attached columns on a high base, over which is an entablature with pinnacles on either end. On the second story over the entrance is a niche with a statue of the Virgin Mary holding the baby Jesus. This, in turn, is flanked with columns and pinnacles, a miniature of the entrance below; a tondo above shows the anagram of the Virgin. Over this all, another semicircular arch is worked into the façade. There in another window bay in the upper story to the left of the entrance, similar to the two bays on the right. There are four smaller windows on the upper part of the ground floor.

=== Interior ===
In the interior, most of the original rooms have been adapted and transformed into modern classrooms devoid of any artistic and architectural interest. However, the southeast side of the building, where the main entrance is located, retains its original structure, as do the gateway, the chapel, the Sala de la Girona ("Hall of Girona"), the central courtyard, the staircase leading upstairs and the old library.

==== Vestibule ====
One enters through the principal doorway to a rectangular vestibule or hall with a carved ceiling with two orders of beams on corbels, decorated with inlay work. This space opens on the right to the chapel, straight ahead to the central courtyard, and on the left to the Sala de la Girona.

==== Chapel ====
The chapel is rectangular, again with a carved ceiling with two orders of beams in the Plateresque style. Immediately above the entry is the choir loft, whose carved ceiling has a single order of beams. The center of this ceiling is decorated with Plateresque motifs alternating with tracery and pineapples. Over this ceiling is the rostrum of the upper choir, composed of a sill of wooden balusters.

The presbytery is raised above the rest of the chapel and at its head sits a neoclassical altarpiece with paintings that date back to a former Renaissance altarpiece. It is separated from the nave by a bay, which is segmented by a 16th-century wrought-iron grating composed of two horizontal bands that divide the two areas. These bands have Renaissance-era decoration with a motif of flaming golden scrolls. Between the two bands are bent vertical bars that—in the lower central area—open to provide access to the chapel. At the top of the grating is a crest composed of semicircles made of bent bars, pointed and crowned with heraldic motifs, configured as an entablature.

The pulpit, made of wood, is on the left wall of the chapel. It consists of an access staircase with a sill of balustrades, a rectangular floor affixed to the wall like a balcony, and a semicircular bay embedded in the wall, under a triangular pediment topped with a cross.

==== Sala de la Girona ====
The Sala de la Girona is roughly rectangular, with a carved ceiling with two orders of beams over corbels. The upper part of its cladding is covered with murals painted in the second half of the 16th century. In the front end wall is a mural of the Virgin Mary enthroned with the baby Jesus on her lap; on both sides are groups of angels who giving him presents, as well as symbols related to the iconology of the Virgin. The composition is framed between drapes held back by angels, revealing an architectural background.

On the right wall the four church fathers are represented, each seated on a chair and surrounded by books scattered on the ground. From left to right they are Saint Jerome, Saint Gregory, Saint Ambrose and Saint Augustine, dressed according to the traditional iconography of these saints, each holding a staffs and a model of the church in one hand while the other shows the pen as a symbol of scripture. The composition is completed with architectural backgrounds and at the bottom with the names of each character written in classical characters on phylacteries.

The mural on the wall facing the one previously described represents the Four Evangelists seated on a marble bench. From left to right are Saint Mark, Saint Luke, Saint John and Saint Matthew, each of them with his symbol. The last of the murals is on the front door. It presents a courtly scene in an imaginary rural landscape. A palatial building is surrounded by large trees and a river. The most prominent focus is a hunting scene of galloping horsemen, but there are also shepherds and dogs caring for their herd. Analysis of the forms and the garments of the characters indicate has shown that the work dates from the early 18th century.

==== Courtyard or patio ====
The central courtyard (Spanish: patio) is rectangular, two stories high, with a double arcade on all four sides. The lower floor features marble columns of the Tuscan order, supporting paired, symmetrical semicircular bays. Above the columns are located small pillars that, at their connection to the entablature, form an alfiz, a type of arch characteristic of Morisco architecture. The upper galleries are composed of columns on high plinths, supporting semicircular bays, paired and covered with iron railings. In the center of the courtyard stands a well with a stone curb.

The staircase rises from the southeast side of the courtyard. Three flights of stairs occupy a rectangular space. The stairs are covered by a barrel vault whose cladding is decorated with octagonal coffers.

==== Library ====
The former library—as of 2004 an assembly hall—sits over the chapel and the principal entrance. It is reached through the gallery of the courtyard, at the top of the staircase. It is rectangular, covered with very elongated trough-shaped armature.

== Paintings ==
In addition to the murals mentioned above and the paintings of the four church fathers and the Four Evangelists, the building also has paintings of the Immaculate Conception, Annunciation, Nativity, and Epiphany and several portraits, including two each of Don Juan Téllez Girón and Doña María de la Cueva.

== Use of the building after 1824 ==
The fate of the building between 1824 and 1847 is unknown. The Law of Public Instruction of 17 September 1845 established Institutos de Segunda Enseñanza (roughly high schools or secondary schools). The old university reopened in 1847 as such an institute, and operated in that capacity until 1993, when it moved to a former old age home restored and adapted by the Council of Education of the Andalusian Autonomous Government.

Since 1995, the building has again been the site of university-level instruction, in the form of the Escuela Universitaria. This required a comprehensive restoration. On the one hand, the building was renovated to resemble as closely as possible its historical appearance; on the other hand, electricity, sanitary facilities, and climatization were brought up to modern standards. The wooden portions of the building, especially the elaborate ceilings, were painstakingly restored, as was the tilework on the towers. One new emergency staircase was added at the corner of the courtyard opposite the historic staircase; an emergency exit was added at the back. An elevator was also added, adjacent to the new staircase.

During restoration, some interesting discoveries were made: the arrangement of openings to the courtyard had apparently been changed at least once in the course of the building's history. The decision was made to retain the longstanding configuration, rather than to restore an even earlier one.

== See also ==
- List of early modern universities in Europe
