= Alfonso Téllez-Girón, 1st Count of Ureña =

Spanish count

Alfonso Téllez-Girón, 1st Count of Ureña, (in full, Spanish: Don Alfonso Téllez-Girón de las Casas, primer conde de Ureña, señor de Osuna, de Tiedra, Peñafiel, Briones, Frechilla, Morón de la Frontera, Archidona, El Arahal, Cazalla de la Sierra, Gelves, Olvera, Ortejicar, Villafrechos, Gumiel de Izán, Villamayor y Santibáñez, Rico-hombre y Notario mayor de Castilla, Camarero mayor de Enrique IV), (c.1454–1469), was a Spanish nobleman.

Alfonso Téllez-Girón was born in Moral de Calatrava, the eldest natural son of Pedro Girón, 1st Lord of Osuna and of Inés de las Casas. He was legitimated by Papal bull on 22 April 1456, confirmed by King Henry IV of Castile on 30 April 1459. The same king granted him the title of Count of Ureña (originally Urueña) on 25 May 1464. He married Blanca de Herrera, Lady of Pedraza de la Sierra, but had no issue.
Alfonso Téllez-Girón died in El Espinar, Segovia, due to complications of a broken foot suffered during a ball game. He was succeeded by his brother Juan.

== Sources ==
- Hobbs, Nicolas (2007). "Grandes de España" (in Spanish). Archived from the original on 25 October 2008.
- Instituto de Salazar y Castro. Elenco de Grandezas y Titulos Nobiliarios Españoles (in Spanish). periodic publication.

Spanish nobility
New title	Count of Ureña; 1464–1469	Succeeded by Juan Téllez-Girón
Preceded by Pedro Girón	Lord of Osuna; 1466–1469	Succeeded by Juan Téllez-Girón
