= Juan Téllez-Girón, 2nd Count of Ureña =

Spanish nobleman

Juan Téllez-Girón, 2nd Count of Ureña (in full, Spanish: Don Juan Téllez-Girón de las Casas, segundo conde de Ureña, señor de Osuna, Tiedra, Peñafiel, Briones, Frechilla, Morón de la Frontera, Archidona, El Arahal, Cazalla de la Sierra, Gelves, Olvera, Ortejicar) (c. 1456 – 21 May 1528) was a Spanish nobleman.

Juan Téllez-Girón was the third natural son of Pedro Girón, 1st Lord of Osuna and of Inés de las Casas. The children were legitimated by Papal bull on March 1466, confirmed by King Henry IV of Castile. He succeeded to the titles of his older brother in 1469.

He married Leonor de la Vega Velasco, daughter of Pedro Fernández de Velasco, 2nd Count of Haro, with whom he had 15 children, including :

- Pedro Girón y Velasco (died 1531), 3rd Count of Ureña and leader of the Revolt of the Comuneros.
- Rodrigo Téllez-Girón (died 1526)
- Juan Téllez-Girón y Velasco, 4th Count of Ureña (1494-1558)
- Isabel Girón, married Beltrán de la Cueva, 3rd Duke of Alburquerque.
- María Girón, married Fernando Enríquez de Velasco, 1st Duke of Medina de Rioseco.
- Leonor de la Vega y Girón, married Luis Fernández Portocarrero Bocanegra, 1st Count of Palma del Río.
- Mencía Girón, married Enrique de Acuña y de Portugal, 4th Count of Valencia de Don Juan.
- Juana Téllez Girón, married Rodrigo Ponce de León, 1st Duke of Arcos.
- María Téllez Girón, married Enrique Pérez de Guzmán, 4th Duke of Medina Sidonia.
- Ana Girón, abbess.

== Sources ==
- Hobbs, Nicolas (2007). "Grandes de España" (in Spanish).
- Instituto de Salazar y Castro. Elenco de Grandezas y Titulos Nobiliarios Españoles (in Spanish). periodic publication.

Spanish nobility
Preceded by Alfonso Téllez-Girón	Count of Ureña; 1469–1528	Succeeded by Pedro Girón
