= Francisco Téllez-Girón, 6th Duke of Osuna =

Spanish diplomat, military officer (1678–1716)

Francisco María de Paula Téllez-Girón y Benavides (11 March 1678–3 April 1716), 6th Duke of Osuna, 6th Marquess of Peñafiel and 10th Count of Ureña, was a Spanish nobleman, diplomat and Grandee of Spain.

== Biography ==
Born in Madrid, he was the first surviving son of Gaspar Téllez-Girón, 5th Duke de Osuna, and his second wife, Ana Antonia de Benavides Carrillo y Toledo, Marquise of Caracena and Countess of Pinto. He inherited the titles of Chief Notary of the Kingdom of Castile (Notario mayor del reino) and Chief Waiter of the King (Camarero mayor del Rey) upon the death of his father in 1694. He also became the 6th Duke of Osuna. He served as Gentleman of the Chamber of King Carlos II of Spain.

On 12 December 1700, he welcomed and made the corresponding obeisances to the new sovereign Philip V of Spain at the Spanish-French border and accompanied the new King on his travel to Madrid. He became a trusted man of Philip V and followed him during his travels in Catalonia and Italy.

At the end of 1711, the King elected him Ambassador Extraordinary and first Plenipotentiary for the Congress of Utrecht. He traveled to Utrecht and accompanied by the Duke of Berwick and the Marquis of Monteleón, he signed the Treaty of Utrecht on 13 July 1713. Likewise, he also negotiated and signed the peace treaty between Spain and Portugal on 16 February 1715.

The Duke would now be assigned as the Ambassador to the Court of Paris, but he died in Paris on 3 April 1716, when he was only 38 years old.
He married María del Pilar y del Rosario Remigia, the only daughter of Íñigo Melchor de Velasco, 7th Duke of Frías. As the marriage only produced 2 daughters, he was succeeded by his younger brother José Maria.

== Sources ==
- Real Academia de la Historia.
- Fernández de Béthencourt, Francisco (1900). Historia genealógica y heráldica de la monarquía española: casa real y grandes de España. Vol. 2. Madrid: Establecimiento Tipográfico de Enrique Teodoro.

Spanish nobility
| Preceded by Gaspar Téllez-Girón | Duke of Osuna; 1694–1716 | Succeeded by José Maria Téllez-Girón |
