= Battle of Castelo Rodrigo =

1664 battle

Coordinates: 40°52′N 6°57′W

- Part of Portuguese Restoration War
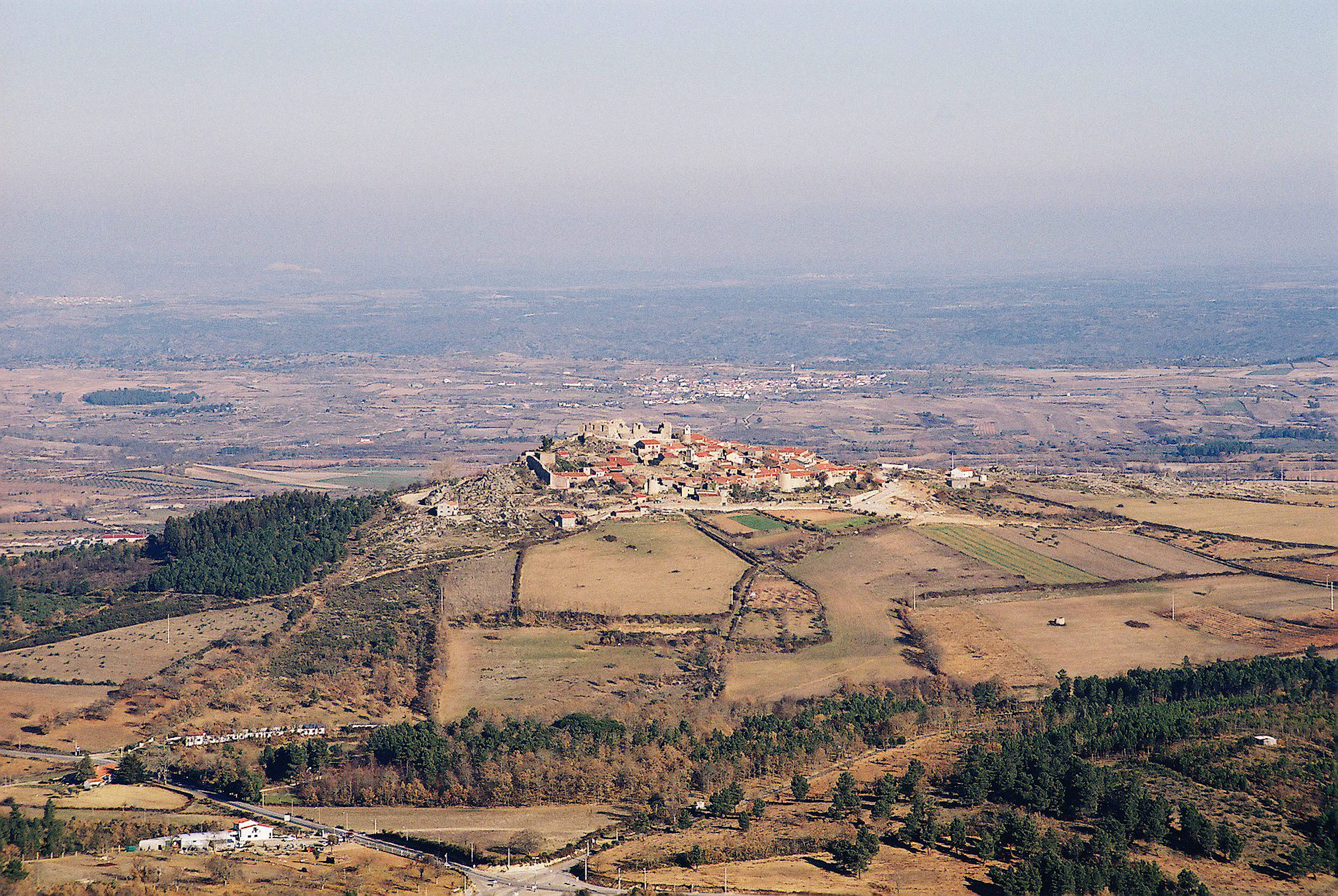
- View of Castelo Rodrigo
Date	7 July 1664
Location	Near Figueira de Castelo Rodrigo, Portugal
Result	Portuguese victory

Belligerents
Portugal	Spain

Commanders and leaders
(Portugal) Pedro Jacques de Magalhães	(Spain) Duke of Osuna (Spain) John of Austria the Younger

Strength
3,000	5,000 to 7,000; 9 cannons

Casualties and losses
1 killed	2,000 killed 500 prisoners All the artillery captured

The Battle of Castelo Rodrigo, also known as the Battle of Salgadela, was fought on 7 July 1664, near Figueira de Castelo Rodrigo, between Spanish and Portuguese as part of the Portuguese Restoration War.

After a number of skirmishes, the Duke of Osuna attacked the castle of Castelo Rodrigo with 7,000 men and 9 pieces of artillery. The castle was only defended by 150 Portuguese.

The military commander of the province, Pedro Jacques de Magalhães, rallied 3,000 men and moved to the rescue of Castelo Rodrigo.

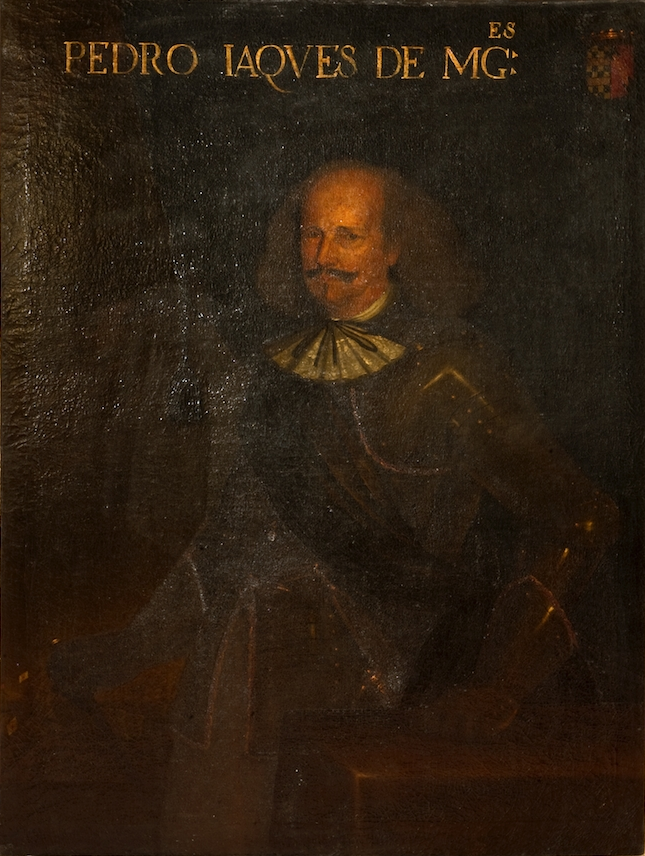
Pedro Jacques de Magalhães, the Portuguese military commander

A battle took place near the village of Mata de Lobos in "Salgadela" which was won by the Portuguese. After an initial Spanish attack was repelled, the Portuguese counter-attack proved decisive. Many prisoners were taken and all the artillery pieces captured. It is told that Osuna and John of Austria the Younger, escaped disguised as monks.

A memorial stone was placed on the site of the battlefield.
