= Duke of Osuna =

Hereditary title in the Peerage of Spain

Dukedom of Osuna
- Creation date: 5 October 1562
- Created by: Philip II
- Peerage: Peerage of Spain
- First holder: Pedro Téllez-Girón y de la Cueva, 1st Duke of Osuna
- Present holder: Ángela María de Solís-Beaumont y Téllez-Girón, 17th Duchess of Osuna

Arms of the Dukes of Osuna as Grandees of Spain

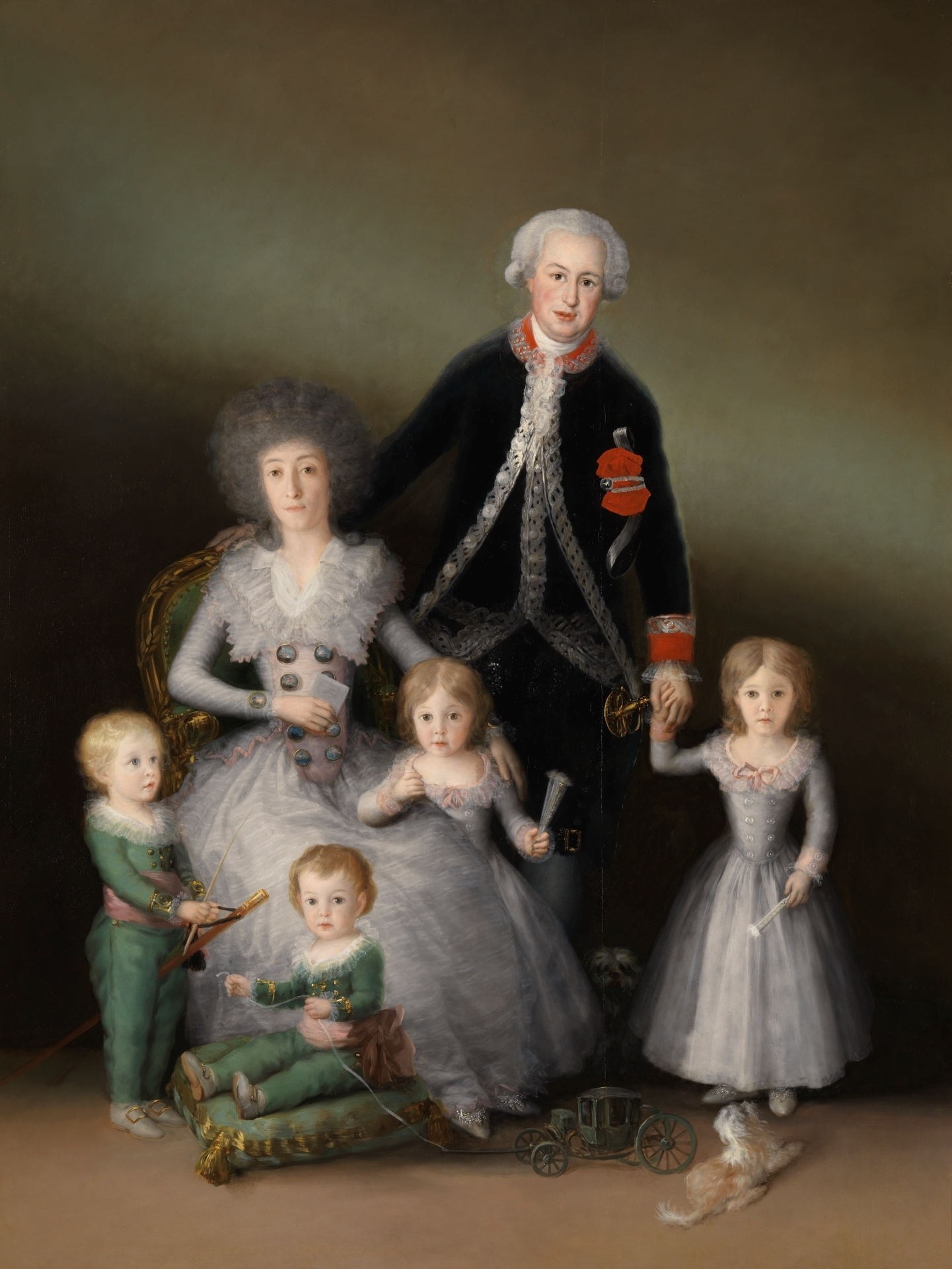
The 9th Duke (1755–1807) and Duchess of Osuna (c. 1754–1834), with their children, c. 1790, portrait by Goya

Duke of Osuna is a Spanish noble title that was first awarded in 1562 by King Philip II of Spain to Pedro Girón de la Cueva, (Osuna, Seville, 29 July 1537 – 1590). Pedro was also Viceroy of Naples, (1582–1586), Ambassador in Portugal and 5th Count of Ureña.

The fortunes of the town of Osuna started to rise in the mid-15th century. At that time, Osuna was ruled by Pedro Girón Acuña Pacheco, the younger brother of Juan Pacheco. His son Alfonso Téllez-Girón de las Casas was elevated to Count of Ureña in 1464 by King Enrique IV of Castile. The dynasty's influence increased, obtaining the title of Duke of Osuna in 1562. Osuna became the Andalusian capital of the domains of the Téllez-Girón family, who carried the ducal title.

Some of the most notable members of the House of Osuna were Pedro Téllez-Girón, 3rd Duke of Osuna, who was a general and viceroy of Naples. He became known to history as the "Great Duke of Osuna".

Another celebrated member was Pedro Téllez-Girón, 9th Duke of Osuna and his wife María Josefa Pimentel, 12th Countess-Duchess of Benavente, who were among the most prominent patrons of the painter Francisco José de Goya y Lucientes.

== Counts of Ureña (1464) ==
- Alfonso Téllez-Girón de las Casas, 1st Count of Ureña
- Juan Téllez-Girón de las Casas, 2nd Count of Ureña
- Pedro Girón y Velasco, 3rd Count of Ureña
- Juan Téllez-Girón y Velasco, 4th Count of Ureña

== Dukes of Osuna (1562) ==
- Pedro Girón de la Cueva, 1st Duke of Osuna
- Juan Téllez-Girón de Guzmán, 2nd Duke of Osuna, 1st Marquis of Peñafiel.
- Pedro Manuel Girón de Velasco, 3rd Duke of Osuna, Viceroy of Sicily (1611–1616) and Viceroy of Naples (1616–1620).
- Juan Tellez-Girón y Enriquez de Ribera, 4th Duke of Osuna (1597–1656).
- Gaspar Téllez-Girón y Sandoval, 5th Duke de Osuna, Viceroy of Catalonia (1667–1669) and Governor of Milan (1670–1674).
- Francisco de Paula Téllez-Girón y Benavides, 6th Duke of Osuna (1678–1716).
- José María Téllez-Girón y Benavides, 7th Duke of Osuna since 1716 (1685 – 8 March 1733).
- Pedro Zoilo Téllez-Girón y Pérez de Guzmán el Bueno, 8th Duke of Osuna since 1733, 7th Marquis of Peñafiel, 11th Count of Ureña, since 1733, Grandee of Spain, was made a Knight of the Order of the Golden Fleece, and of the Order of Carlos III, (27 June 1728 – 1 April 1787).
- Pedro Téllez-Girón y Pacheco, 9th Duke of Osuna since 1787 (8 August 1755 – 7 January 1807).
- Francisco Téllez-Girón, 10th Duke de Osuna since 1807 (6 October 1785 – 21 May 1820).
- Pedro de Alcántara Téllez-Girón y Beaufort-Spontin, 11th Duke of Osuna (1810–1844), also 14th Duke of the Infantado, died without issue.
- Mariano Téllez-Girón y Beaufort-Spontin, 12th Duke of Osuna (Madrid, 19 July 1814 – Beauraing, Belgium, 2 June 1882), also 15th Duke of the Infantado and brother of the 11th Duke.
- Pedro de Àlcantara Téllez-Girón y Fernández de Santillán, 13th Duke of Osuna (1812–1900).
- Luis María Téllez-Girón y Fernández de Córdoba, 14th Duke of Osuna (1870–1909).
- Mariano Téllez-Girón y Fernández de Córdoba, 15th Duke of Osuna. (1887–1931), brother of the 14th Duke. Married to Petra Duque de Estrada y Moreno.
- Angela Téllez-Girón y Duque de Estrada, 16th Duchess of Osuna (1925–2015), became duchess at the age of 6 years.
- Ángela María de Solís-Beaumont y Téllez-Girón. 17th Duchess of Osuna since 2016.

== Details ==
- Pedro Téllez-Girón, 1st Duke of Osuna :

One of his daughters, María, (Moron de la Frontera, 1553–1608) married on 18 March 1570, Juan Fernández de Velasco, 5th Duke of Frías, and their daughter, known as Ana de Velasco y Girón married, on 17 June 1603, the Portuguese 7th Duke of Braganza, Teodósio II, (Vila Viçosa, Portugal, 28 February 1568 – Vila Viçosa, 29 November 1630). The outcome of this marriage between the Ana de Velasco y Téllez-Girón and the Duke Teodósio II, was that they were the parents of John IV of Portugal "the Restorer", (Vila Viçosa, 18 March 1604 – Lisbon, 6 November 1656), the first Braganza to be crowned King of Portugal, following the nacionalist coup against the Spanish Habsburgs, on 1 December 1640.

It was alleged that being already a Duke, he fathered an illegitimate son, known as Gabriel Téllez, becoming an active Member and Travel Visitor of the Religious Orden de la Merced, and being known today as famous Spanish theatrical author Tirso de Molina, (1584 – Soria, 12 March 1648).

- Don Francisco Téllez-Girón, 6th Duke of Osuna :

Married in 1694, aged 16, Maria Remigia Fernández de Velasco y Tovar, but there was not adult male issue. He was a supporter of King Philip V of Spain and plenipotentiary signer of the Treaty of Utrecht.

- Francisco de Borja Téllez-Girón y Pimentel, 10th Duke of Osuna :

Painted by Goya as a child together with his eldest sister, Maria Joaquina Téllez-Girón y Pimentel. Married 19 March 1802, at 17, 17th year old Françoise Philippine Thomas de Beaufort-Spontin y Toledo, (Paris 7 March 1785 – 28 January 1830), daughter of Count and Marquis Friedrich August Alex von Beaufort-Spontin, who also became c. 1782 Duke von Beaufort-Spontin (Namur 14 September 1751 – Brussels 22 April 1817), and Leopoldina de Toledo y Salm-Salm, (Madrid, 1760 – Brussels, 4 July 1792).

- Mariano Téllez-Girón, 12th Duke of Osuna :

He represented Spain in the crowning of Queen Victoria in England and in the marriage in 1853 of Spanish aristocrat Eugenia de Montijo to Napoleon III. He is reported by Spanish diplomat and notorious writer Juan Valera, later Spanish Ambassador in the US, to have spent with him, Embassy Officer, and his extravagant Russian friends, while Spanish Ambassador in Russia (1856–1862), incredible amounts of money in Saint Petersburg.

When Mariano died in 1882, aged 68, there were lawsuits from pretenders supposed to be closely connected to the family, as well as creditors racing many of the buildings, castles, lands, artworks, etc. Closer inspections around many of the accumulated nobility titles reveal that they are held now by rather ambiguous persons (legally speaking about their supposed inheritance rights).

He married in Wiesbaden, 4 April 1866, Marie Eleonore zu Salm-Salm, née Princess zu Salm-Salm, (Hessen, Frankfurt am Main, 31 January 1842 – Dülmen, 18 June 1891), who became thus the 12th Duchess Consort of Osuna. She remarried to the Duc of Croy when Mariano died but there was no issue from either marriage.

Notice that the Salm-Salm family had entered already within the Osuna family through the Count, Marquis and Duke Friedrich, (deceased 1817), and his first wife Leopoldina de Toledo y Salm-Salm, (deceased 1792), parents-in-law of the 10th Duke of Osuna.

== See also ==
- Collegiate Church of Osuna
- Paintings for the alameda of the Dukes of Osuna

== Sources ==
- Hobbs, Nicolas (2007). "Grandes de España" (in Spanish).
- Instituto de Salazar y Castro. Elenco de Grandezas y Titulos Nobiliarios Españoles (in Spanish). periodic publication.
