= Juan Tellez-Girón y Enriquez de Ribera, 4th Duke of Osuna =

Juan Tellez-Girón y Enriquez de Ribera 4th Duke of Osuna

Viceroy of Sicily
- In office 1655–1656
- Monarch: King Philip III
- Preceded by: Rodrigo de Sandoval y Mendoza
- Succeeded by: Martin de Redin

Personal details
- Born: 15 November 1597 Peñafiel, Spain
- Died: 12 October 1656 (aged 58) Palermo, Sicily
- Spouse: Isabel Raimunda de Sandoval y Padilla
- Children: Pedro Baltasar Téllez Girón; Gaspar Téllez-Girón

Juan Tellez-Girón y Enriquez de Ribera, 4th Duke of Osuna (15 November 1597 – 12 October 1656) was Viceroy of Sicily from 1655 to 1656. He was the only male descendant of Pedro Téllez-Girón, 3rd Duke of Osuna who was born in December 1579, and was Viceroy of Sicily from 1610 to 1615 and Viceroy of Naples from 1615 to 1620. His mother was Catalina Enriquez de Ribera y Cortés who died in November 1635 and was one of 3 daughters of Fernando Enriquez, 2nd Duke of Alcalá de los Gazules.

He married Isabel Raimunda de Sandoval y Padilla, who died in 1658 and was the daughter of Cristóbal de Sandoval, Duke of Uceda. They had two children:

- Pedro Baltasar Téllez Girón, Marquis of Peñafiel, born April 1624 and died as a young child
- Gaspar Téllez-Girón, 5th Duke de Osuna, born May 1625 and died in June 1694. He was Duke of Osuna (1656–1694) and Viceroy of Catalonia (1667–1669), and married twice, first with Felisa de Sandoval, 3rd Duchess of Uceda and then with Ana Antonia de Benavides y Ponce de Leon, 6th Marchioness of Frómista.

== Bibliography ==
- Jorge Valverde Fraikin. Titulos Nobiliarios Andaluces, Editorial Andalucia, Granada,(1991).
- D. António Caetano de Sousa História Genealógica da Casa Real Portuguesa, Atlântida-Livraria Editora, Lda, 2ª Edição, Coimbra, (1946).
- Felgueiras Gayo Carvalhos de Basto, 2ª Edição.Nobiliário das Famílias de Portugal, Braga, (1989)

Spanish nobility
Preceded by Pedro Téllez-Girón	Duke of Osuna; 1624–1656	Succeeded by Gaspar Téllez-Girón
