= Juan de Zúñiga y Requesens =

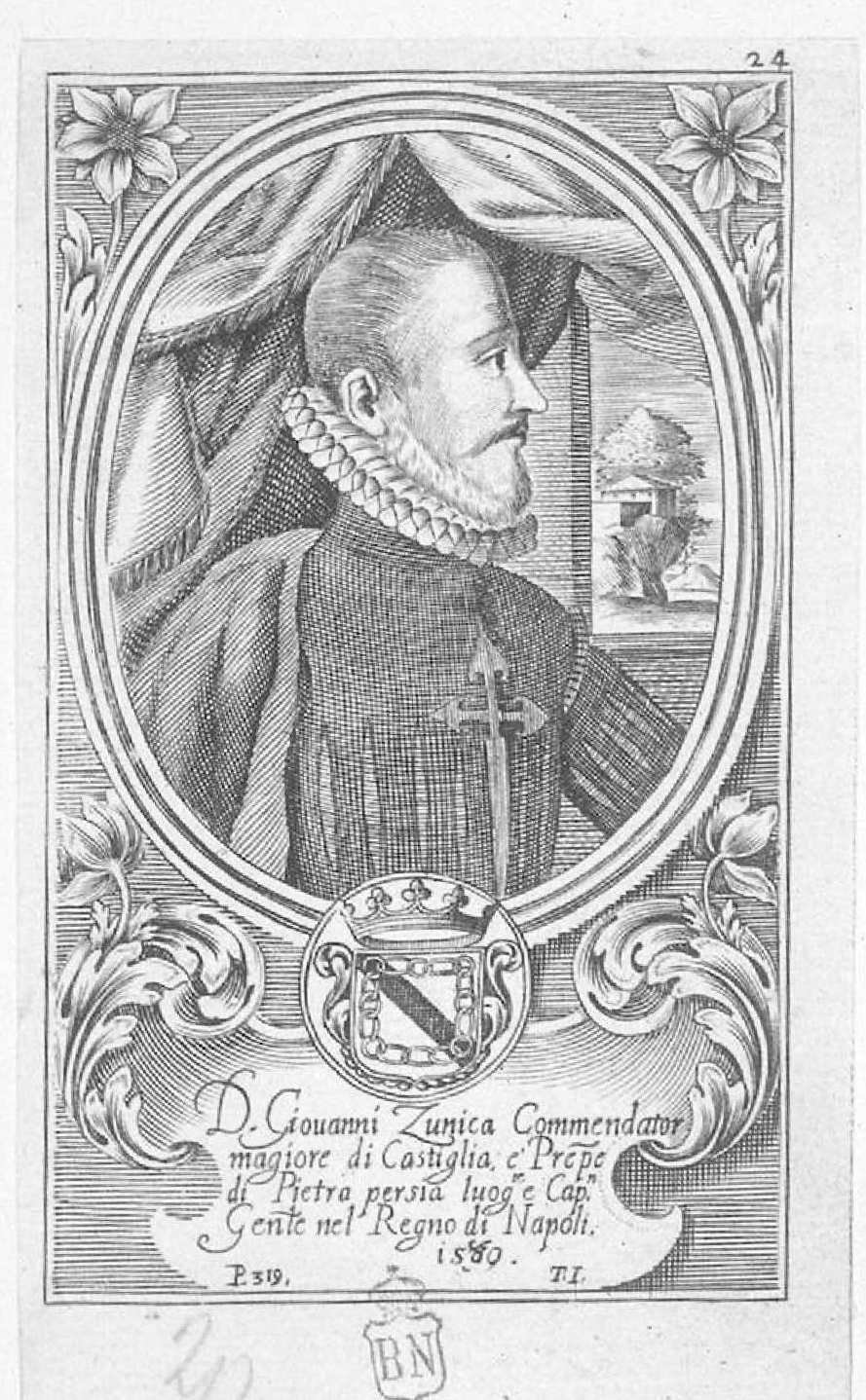
The drawing of Juan de Zuñiga's portrait

Juan de Zúñiga y Requesens (Valladolid November 1536 – Madrid, 17 November 1586) was Spanish Ambassador to Rome (1568-1579) and Viceroy of Naples (1579–1582).

== Biography ==
He was the sixth child of Juan de Zúñiga Avellaneda y Velasco (circa 1490 – 1546), Philip II's tutor, and Estefanía de Requesens y Rois de Liori (d. 1549), and the brother of Luis de Requesens y Zúñiga.

In 1668, he succeeded his eldest brother Luis as Ambassador in Rome. He took part in the negotiations with Pius V to set up the Holy League to counteract naval piracy and the Turkish invasion of Suleiman I the Magnificent, (1520–1566), which led to the Battle of Lepanto in 1571, the successfully Spanish bombing of the remnant of the Ottoman fleet at Alger and Tripoli, and the plundering of the costal region of Anatolia, which result in the decisive defeat of Ottoman invasion of Western and Southern Europe.

In 1572, he married the Sicilian noblewoman Giulia Barrese, thus becoming Prince of Pietraperzia. Giulia Dorotea Barrese was the daughter of the infamous Girolamo Barrese, marquis of Pietraperzia, a title first awarded by Charles V at Mainz on 16 August 1526.

In 1579, he was appointed Viceroy of Naples. In Naples, he recruited ships and people (in support of the claims of King Philip II of Spain whose mother had been a Portuguese princess) to attack and conquer (with the support of a part of the Portuguese nobility) the city of Lisbon, Portugal. Closely involved with King Philip II of Spain he died in 1583, having been promoted to the Royal Council of Spain and the Spanish Council of War.

== Sources ==
- Gran Enciclopedia de España. 22 vols. with 11,052 pages, ISBN 84-923944-3-9. See vol 22, page 11,049

Government offices
Preceded by Íñigo López de Mendoza y Mendoza	Viceroy of Naples; 1579–1582	Succeeded by Pedro Téllez-Girón, 1st Duke of Osuna
