= Juan Téllez-Girón, 2nd Duke of Osuna =

Spanish nobleman

Juan Téllez-Girón, 2nd Duke of Osuna, Grandee of Spain, (in full, Spanish: Don Juan Téllez-Girón de Guzmán, primer marqués de Peñafiel, segundo duque de Osuna, décimo sexto conde de Ureña, Grande de España, señor de las villas de Tiedra, Briones, Gumiel de Izán, Cazalla de la Sierra, el Arahal, Olvera, Morón de la Frontera, Archidona y Otejícar, Notario mayor de Castilla, Camarero mayor del Rey), (20 October 1559 – 25 November 1600), was a Spanish nobleman.

Juan Téllez-Girón was the son of Pedro Girón, 1st Duke of Osuna and of Leonor Ana de Guzmán y Aragón (c.1540–23 November 1573), daughter of Juan Alfonso Pérez de Guzmán, 3rd Duke of Medina Sidonia. In 1570, he married his cousin Ana María de Velasco, daughter of Íñigo Fernández de Velasco, 4th Duke of Frías, with whom he had 5 children.

== Sources ==
- Hobbs, Nicolas (2007). "Grandes de España" (in Spanish).
- Instituto de Salazar y Castro. Elenco de Grandezas y Titulos Nobiliarios Españoles (in Spanish). periodic publication.

Spanish nobility
Preceded by Pedro Girón	Duke of Osuna; 1590–1600	Succeeded by Pedro Téllez-Girón
New title	Marquis of Peñafiel; 1562–1590	Succeeded by Pedro Téllez-Girón
