= Gaspar Téllez-Girón, 5th Duke of Osuna =

Spanish general

General Gaspar Téllez Girón y Pacheco Gómez de Sandoval Enríquez de Ribera 5th Duke of Osuna 5th Marquess of Peñafiel 9th Count of Ureña Lord of Olvera Duke Consort of Uceda
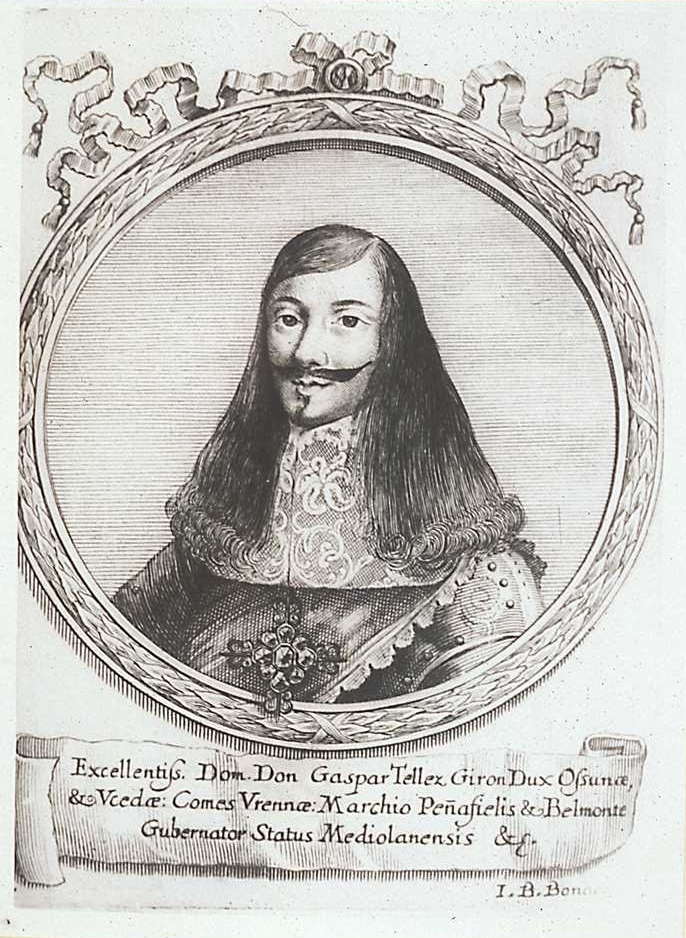
- Gaspar Téllez-Girón. Engraving by Giovanni Battista Bonacina.
- Born: 25 May 1625; Madrid, Spanish Empire
- Died: 2 June 1694 (aged 69); Madrid, Spanish Empire
- Spouse(s): Feliche de Sandoval y Rojas (1645–1671); Ana Antonia de Benavides Carrillo y Toledo (1672–1694)
- Children: Isabel Téllez Girón y Sandoval (Note: With Feliche de Sandoval); María de las Nieves; Catalina; Jacinta; Francisco Téllez-Girón, 6th Duke of Osuna (Note: With Ana Antonia de Benavides); José María Téllez-Girón, 7th Duke of Osuna; Ana María; Manuela
- Relatives: Juan Tellez-Girón y Enriquez de Ribera, 4th Duke of Osuna (father); Isabel Gómez de Sandoval-Rojas y Padilla (mother); Pedro Téllez-Girón, 3rd Duke of Osuna (grandfather); Luis de Benavides Carrillo, Marquis of Caracena (father-in-law)
- Military career
- Allegiance: Spanish Empire
- Branch: Spanish Army
- Service years: 1657–1694
- Rank: General
- Conflicts: Portuguese Restoration War: Battle of Montes Claros; Battle of Castelo Rodrigo; War of Devolution: Spanish invasion of Sardinia

Viceroy of Catalonia
- In office 4 August 1667 – December 1669
- Monarch: Charles II
- Regent: Mariana of Austria
- Preceded by: Vicente de Gonzaga y Doria
- Succeeded by: Francisco Fernández de Córdoba

Governor of the Duchy of Milan
- In office 6 March 1669 – 5 May 1671
- Monarch: Charles II
- Regent: Mariana of Austria
- Valido: Juan Everardo Nithard; Fernando de Valenzuela
- Preceded by: Paolo Spinola, 3rd Marquis of Los Balbases
- Succeeded by: Antonio Lopez de Ayala Velasco y Cardeñas

President of the Council of Orders
- In office 14 December 1675 – November 1677
- Monarch: Charles II
- Regent: Mariana of Austria
- Valido: Fernando de Valenzuela; John Joseph of Austria
- Preceded by: Íñigo Melchor de Velasco, 7th Duke of Frías
- Succeeded by: Francisco Fernández de Córdoba

President of the Council of Aragon
- In office 1692 – 2 June 1694
- Monarch: Charles II
- Preceded by: Melchor de Navarra, Duke of Palata
- Succeeded by: Fernando de Aragón y Moncada

Gaspar Téllez-Girón, 5th Duke de Osuna (25 May 1625 – Madrid, 2 June 1694), 5th Marquess of Peñafiel, 9th Count of Ureña and other lesser titles, was a Spanish general and a Grandee of Spain.

He lost the Battle of Castelo Rodrigo in 1664, as part of the Portuguese Restoration War. He was Viceroy of Catalonia, 1667–1669, Governor of the Duchy of Milan, Italy, (1670–1674), when he was replaced by Claude Lamoral, Prince of Ligne.
He was also President of the Council of Aragon between 1692 and 1694.

== Family ancestors background ==
He was the grandson of Pedro Téllez-Girón, 3rd Duke of Osuna, Viceroy of Sicily, Viceroy of Naples, and the son of Juan Tellez-Girón y Enriquez de Ribera, 4th Duke of Osuna, Viceroy of Sicily.

== Don Gaspar marriages ==
In his first marriage in 1645 he married a cousin, Feliche de Sandoval Rojas y Enriquez de Cabrera, named as her mother Felice, deceased in Milan, Italy on 7 October 1671, who held her own inherited title of 4th Duchess of Uceda and was therefore, also a Grandee of Spain on her own rights. She was daughter of Francisco de Sandoval Rojas, 2nd Duke of Lerma and 2nd Duke of Uceda, Duke of Cea. Her mother Felice was a member of the powerful and old Colonna family. The children who survived, (5 out of 7), were all daughters who married within the pinnacle of the highest Spanish Nobility of the time.

He married again in 1672, aged 47, 19 years old Ana Antonia Francisca, (1653–1707), 4th Marchioness of Caracena. Her father was Luis de Benavides Carrillo, Marquis of Caracena, 6th marquis of Frómista, Governor of the Duchy of Milan and Governor of the Habsburg Netherlands. Her mother was Catalina Ponce de León, third daughter of Rodrigo Ponce de León, 4th Duke of Arcos.
They had 2 sons and 2 daughters, including :

- Francisco Téllez-Girón, 6th Duke of Osuna (1678-1716), Ambassador and Plenipotentiary minister for the Treaty of Utrecht, (1713). Married in 1695, he got two daughters, so the title passed to his surviving brother:
- José María Téllez-Girón, 7th Duke of Osuna (1685-1733), had issue.

== Sources ==
- Hobbs, Nicolas (2007). "Grandes de España" (in Spanish).
- Instituto de Salazar y Castro. Elenco de Grandezas y Titulos Nobiliarios Españoles (in Spanish). periodic publication.

== Notes ==
Government offices
Preceded by Vicente de Gonzaga y Doria	Viceroy of Catalonia; 1667–1669	Succeeded by Francisco Fernández de Córdoba, Duke of Sessa
Preceded by Paolo Spinola, 3rd Marquis of the Balbases, 2nd term	Governor of the Duchy of Milan; 1670–1674	Succeeded by The Prince of Ligne
Spanish nobility
Preceded by Juan Téllez-Girón	Duke of Osuna; 1656–1694	Succeeded by Francisco Téllez-Girón
