= Pedro Girón Acuña Pacheco =

Spanish noble (1423–1466)

- Born: 1423; Belmonte, Cuenca, Spain
- Died: 1466 (aged 42–43); Villarrubia de los Ojos
- Occupations: Nobleman and politician
- Children: Alfonso Téllez-Girón; Rodrigo Téllez Girón; Juan Téllez-Girón

Pedro Girón (1423–1466), was Master of the Order of Calatrava (1445–1466), 1st Lord of Ureña and Osuna, and a powerful Castilian magnates in the mid-fifteenth century. Born into a powerful noble family, he was the brother of Juan Pacheco, one of the most influential royal favorites of the reign of Henry IV of Castile.

Through royal patronage and his early service in the household of the future king, Girón rose rapidly in court politics, securing important offices and revenues. His decisive advancement came after the Battle of Olmedo in 1445, when he was appointed Grand Master of Calatrava, gaining immense military, economic, and political authority. Despite initial opposition to his appointment, he consolidated control over the Order and used its resources to expand both his personal power and his family's territorial base.

Throughout his career, Girón played a central role in the factional struggles that dominated Castilian politics, aligning closely with his brother to influence royal policy and advance their family interests. Under Henry IV of Castile (Enrique IV), he reached the height of his power, participating in campaigns against Granada and exercising broad authority in Andalusia. However, shifting court alliances and the rise of rival favorites led him to join the noble opposition, culminating in his support for the rebellion that deposed the king symbolically during the Farce of Ávila in 1465. In his final years, Girón controlled much of Andalusia and wielded near-sovereign authority, but his sudden death in 1466 curtailed his ambitions. His legacy endured through his successful transformation of the Order of Calatrava into a dynastic power base and through the prominence of his descendants, who became leading figures in the Castilian nobility

== Biography ==
Born in 1423, Pedro Girón came from a distinguished noble lineage closely connected to the political elite of the Crown of Castile. He was the son of Alfonso Téllez Girón, Lord of Belmonte and Frechoso, and María Pacheco. His older brother was Juan Pacheco, Marquis of Villena, one of the most influential royal favorites of the reign of Henry IV of Castile. Through both paternal and maternal lines, Pedro Girón descended from prominent Iberian noble families, including Portuguese émigrés who had supported John I of Castile following the Battle of Aljubarrota. His aristocratic background and his family's strategic alliances provided the foundation for his rapid rise to power.

=== Public life ===
Girón entered public life around the age of twenty, benefiting from the patronage of Álvaro de Luna, the powerful Constable of Castile. Like his brother, he soon became attached to the household of the Prince of Asturias, the future Henry IV of Castile, serving as a page and gaining early exposure to court politics. By the early 1440s, he had secured important offices, including that of chief chamberlain to the prince. These roles brought him not only prestige but also substantial economic rewards, including revenues and administrative rights in key commercial centers such as Andalusia and Medina del Campo.

Girón's political and military ascent accelerated significantly after the Battle of Olmedo in 1445, a decisive conflict in which he fought with Henry IV against the infantes of Aragon. The aftermath of this battle marked a turning point in Castilian politics, as the defeat of Aragon led to the redistribution of their extensive lands and titles. Girón, alongside his brother Juan Pacheco and Álvaro de Luna, was among the principal beneficiaries of this reallocation. Girón received several important lordships, including Urueña and Tiedra, as well as valuable fiscal rights such as the tithes of Arévalo.

=== Order of Calatrava ===
In 1445, Girón was appointed Grand Master of the Order of Calatrava, one of the most powerful military and religious institutions in Castile. This position conferred immense authority, encompassing military command, extensive landholdings, and significant political influence. His appointment, confirmed by both secular and ecclesiastical authorities, including the king, the Order's chapter, and the papacy, was not without controversy. A rival claimant, Juan Ramírez de Guzmán, contested the office, supported by a faction within the Order and by his own military resources. The dispute was ultimately resolved through negotiation, culminating in a settlement in 1448 whereby Guzmán renounced his claim in exchange for substantial financial compensation and hereditary privileges. This agreement solidified Girón's control over the Order within Castile, though recognition in other territories, particularly those aligned with Aragon, was delayed until 1463.

Girón's tenure as Grand Master was characterized by an extensive use of the Order's resources to advance his family's interests. He undertook complex territorial exchanges and acquisitions designed to secure a lasting inheritance for his descendants. Notably, he arranged for the transfer of key lordships such as Osuna and Cazalla into his family's possession, laying the foundations for the later ducal house of Osuna. Even more striking was his successful effort to ensure that the mastership of Calatrava would pass to his young son, Rodrigo Téllez Girón. This arrangement, which violated the traditional statutes of the Order, underscored the extent of Girón's power and influence. After his death, the administration of the Order by his brother Juan Pacheco facilitated the acceptance of this extraordinary succession.

Despite his power and influence, Girón's position was periodically challenged by external political forces. Alfonso of Aragon, an illegitimate son of the King of Navarre, continued to claim the mastership and attempted to assert his authority through military intervention. However, Girón successfully resisted these efforts, demonstrating both his military capability and his firm control over the Order's Castilian base. In response to opposition or disloyalty, he frequently employed punitive expeditions, targeting towns that had supported his rivals or resisted his authority. These campaigns not only reinforced his dominance but also served as opportunities for financial gain through plunder.

In addition to his role within the Order, Girón played a central part in the political life of Castile. He held the office of Chief Chamberlain to the king and served on the Royal Council. His political alignment closely followed that of his brother, and together they formed a powerful faction that sought to control royal policy and expand their own influence. During the reign of John II of Castile, Girón supported the Prince of Asturias in opposition to Álvaro de Luna, contributing to the shifting alliances and factional struggles that characterized the period. His loyalty to the prince was rewarded with further grants, including lands, offices, and revenues across Castile and Andalusia.

=== Reign of Henry IV of Castile ===
With the accession of Henry IV in 1454, Girón reached the height of his influence. As a close ally of the new king, he saw his previous grants confirmed and received additional revenues and privileges. He also played an active role in military campaigns, particularly in the renewed war against the Emirate of Granada. Leading substantial forces, he participated in raids and sieges across the frontier, earning both military distinction and further royal favor. His appointment as Captain General of the frontier underscored his importance in the kingdom's defensive and offensive operations, and he was entrusted with the fortification of key Andalusian cities.

=== Rebellion ===
During the late 1450s and early 1460s, Girón and his brother effectively dominated Castilian politics. However, their position was challenged by the rise of new royal favorites, particularly Beltrán de la Cueva. This shift in royal favor led to renewed factional conflict and the re-emergence of an alliance of magnates opposed to the king's policies. Girón actively participated in this opposition, engaging in conspiracies and military actions aimed at curbing royal authority and securing his own position.

The conflict reached a dramatic climax with the so-called Farce of Ávila in 1465, when rebellious nobles symbolically deposed Henry IV and proclaimed Infante Alfonso, the 11-year-old half-brother of Henry IV, as king. Although Girón did not personally attend the ceremony, he played a crucial role in supporting the rebellion in Andalusia. Through military campaigns, he secured control over key cities and fortresses, enabling the proclamation of Alfonso in the region. His authority in Andalusia was so extensive that he styled himself Viceroy and exercised near-sovereign power.

Girón's campaigns in Andalusia brought him into direct conflict with royalist forces, particularly those led by Miguel Lucas de Iranzo, the constable of Castile. Despite initial successes, including the capture of several important cities, Girón was unable to secure complete control, and the conflict remained unresolved. Nevertheless, his position as a leading figure of the rebel faction was firmly established, and he continued to play a decisive role in the political and military struggles of the period.

Girón became involved in negotiations aimed at reconciling the rebellious nobles with Henry IV. As part of these efforts, a marriage was arranged between Girón and the Infanta Isabel, the king's half-sister and future queen. This proposed union represented a significant political alliance, potentially strengthening Girón's position and altering the balance of power within the kingdom. However, before the marriage could take place, Girón fell ill while traveling to the court. He died on May 2, 1466, at the age of forty-three.

=== Children ===
Pedro Girón never formally married, although he was engaged on more than one occasion. He maintained a long-term relationship with Isabel de las Casas, with whom he had three children, later legitimized by papal authority:

- Alfonso Téllez-Girón (c. 1453–1469), 1st Count of Ureña and heir to the paternal lordships;
- Rodrigo Téllez Girón (1456–1482), Master of Calatrava, who succeeded his father at age 11, killed in battle;
- Juan Téllez-Girón (c. 1456–1528), 2nd Count of Ureña who inherited the family lordships upon the premature death of his brother Alfonso in 1469 and from whom the members of the House of Osuna descend.

== Sources ==
- Marino, Nancy F. (2006). Don Juan Pacheco: wealth and power in late medieval Spain. Tempe, Ariz: Arizona Center for Medieval and Renaissance Studies. ISBN 978-0-86698-356-3.
- O'Callaghan, Joseph F. (1975) [1961]. "Don Pedro Girón, Master of the Order of Calatrava, 1445-1466". The Spanish military order of Calatrava and its affiliates: collected studies. London: Variorum reprints. ISBN 978-0-902089-75-4.
- Rodríguez-Picavea Matilla, Enrique. "Pedro Girón Pacheco". Real Academia de la Historia (in Spanish).
