= Catalan Republic (1640–1641) =

Short-lived independent state in Western Europe

Catalan Republic República Catalana (Catalan)
- 1640–1641
- Coat of arms

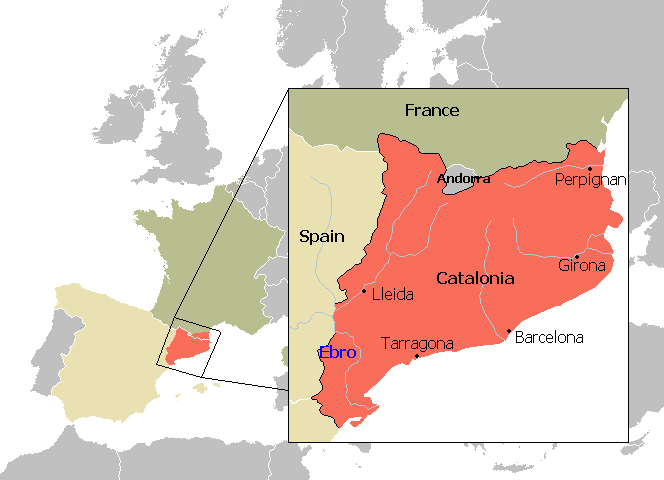
- Location of the Catalan Republic. The territory temporary occupied by Spanish armies isn't depicted
- Status: Independent republic under French protection
- Capital: Barcelona
- Common languages: Catalan
- Religion: Roman Catholicism
- Demonym: Catalan
- Government: Parliamentary republic
- President of the Generalitat
  - 1640-1641: Pau Claris
  - 1641: Josep Soler
  - 1641: Bernat de Cardona
- Legislature: Junta de Braços
- Historical era: Thirty Years' War
  - Junta de Braços summoned: 10 September 1640
  - Republic established: 16 January 1641
  - Louis XIII of France appointed Count of Barcelona: 23 January 1641
  - Treaty of Peronne: 19 September 1641
  - Louis XIII swears the Catalan constitutions: 30 December 1641
- Currency: Croat and others
Preceded by	Succeeded by
Principality of Catalonia	Principality of Catalonia
- Today part of: France; Spain ∟ Catalonia

The Catalan Republic (Catalan: República Catalana, IPA: [rəˈpubːlikə kətəˈlanə]) was a short-lived independent state under French protection which began to be established after the autumn of 1640 by the Junta de Braços (assembly of Estates) of the Principality of Catalonia led by the President of the Generalitat, Pau Claris, during the Reapers' War (1640–1652), and being acknowledged by the same institutions between January and December of 1641.

As the conflict with the Spanish Monarchy escalated, the Junta de Braços of Catalonia, headed by the President of the Generalitat of Catalonia, Pau Claris, assumed the sovereignty and the effective rule of the Principality after September 1640 and ultimately, while the royal armies approached to Barcelona, accepted the establishment of the Catalan Republic on 16 January 1641. On 23 January 1641, due to the desperate military situation and French pressure, the Junta de Braços proclaimed Louis XIII as Count of Barcelona, beginning the process to put the Principality of Catalonia in a personal union with the Kingdom of France, culminated after December 1641. Louis XIII was succeeded upon his death in 1643 by Louis XIV, who remained Count of Barcelona until 1652, when Catalonia was reincorporated into the Spanish Monarchy.

== History ==
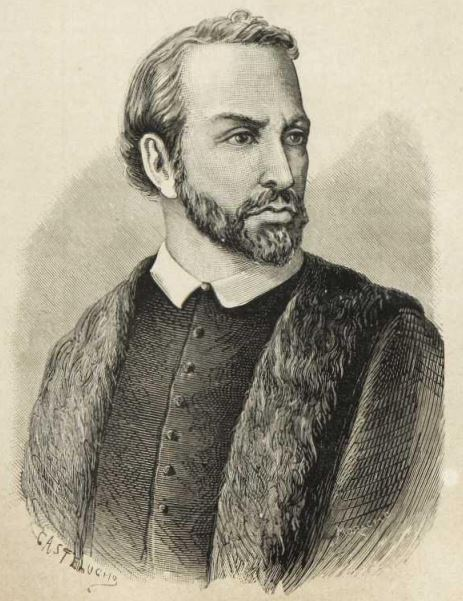
Pau Claris i Casademunt

At the beginning of the Reapers' War which started in 1640 (part of the wider Franco-Spanish War of 1635–1659) the President of the Generalitat, Pau Claris, summoned the 10 September the Junta de Braços or Braços Generals (assembly of Estates or States-General) of Catalonia, an extraordinary body made up of the representatives of the three Estates of the realm in the General Court of Catalonia (the parliament), presided by the Generalitat. The Junta was a response to the power void created by the Corpus de Sang events in Barcelona (7 June), in which the viceroy of Catalonia, Dalmau de Queralt, and the royal officers were assassinated by a multitude of peasants. The reaction of the Count-Duke of Olivares, the king's minister, was to prepare the military occupation of the Principality, punish those allegedly responsible of the revolt (both peasants and Catalan politicians) and then summit the General Court of Catalonia in the town of Montblanc, in order to obtain his project of Union of Arms and various centralizing measures under military pressure as it already happened in the Kingdom of Aragon in 1592.

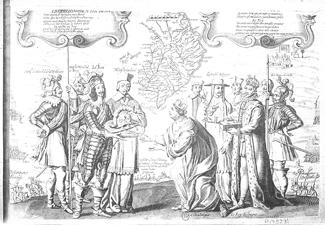
Allegory of Catalonia asking to France for protection

The summit of the Junta de Braços was a success and an extraordinary improvement of representation by standards of the time in the European context, as it was also attended by representatives of cities which usually weren't invited to the Courts, as well as from various feudal towns and, in addition, it mostly worked under the basis of individual vote instead of the traditional single vote per Estate. The new assembly began to assume the sovereignty, enacting a series of revolutionary measures. Those included the establishment of its own Council of Justice in replacement of the Royal Audience of Catalonia (the royal judges were also assassinated during the Corpus de Sang), the Council of Defense in order to raise an army to respond the expected Royal counter-attack, as well as the Council of Treasury which began to issue debt and a special tax to the nobility, while sought support in France. Bernard du Plessis-Besançon was appointed plenipotentiary of the King of France to Catalonia on 29 August 1640. On 27 October an agreement was finally reached with du Plessis-Besançon to obtain supplies against the army of the King of Spain directed by Pedro Fajardo, Marquis of los Vélez. At the same time, the Consell de Cent (local government of Barcelona) led by the prestigious jurist Joan Pere Fontanella, gave support to the Junta's decicions and approved its own expansion of representation, incorporating a sixth councelor as representative of the artisans, reivindicated for a long time.

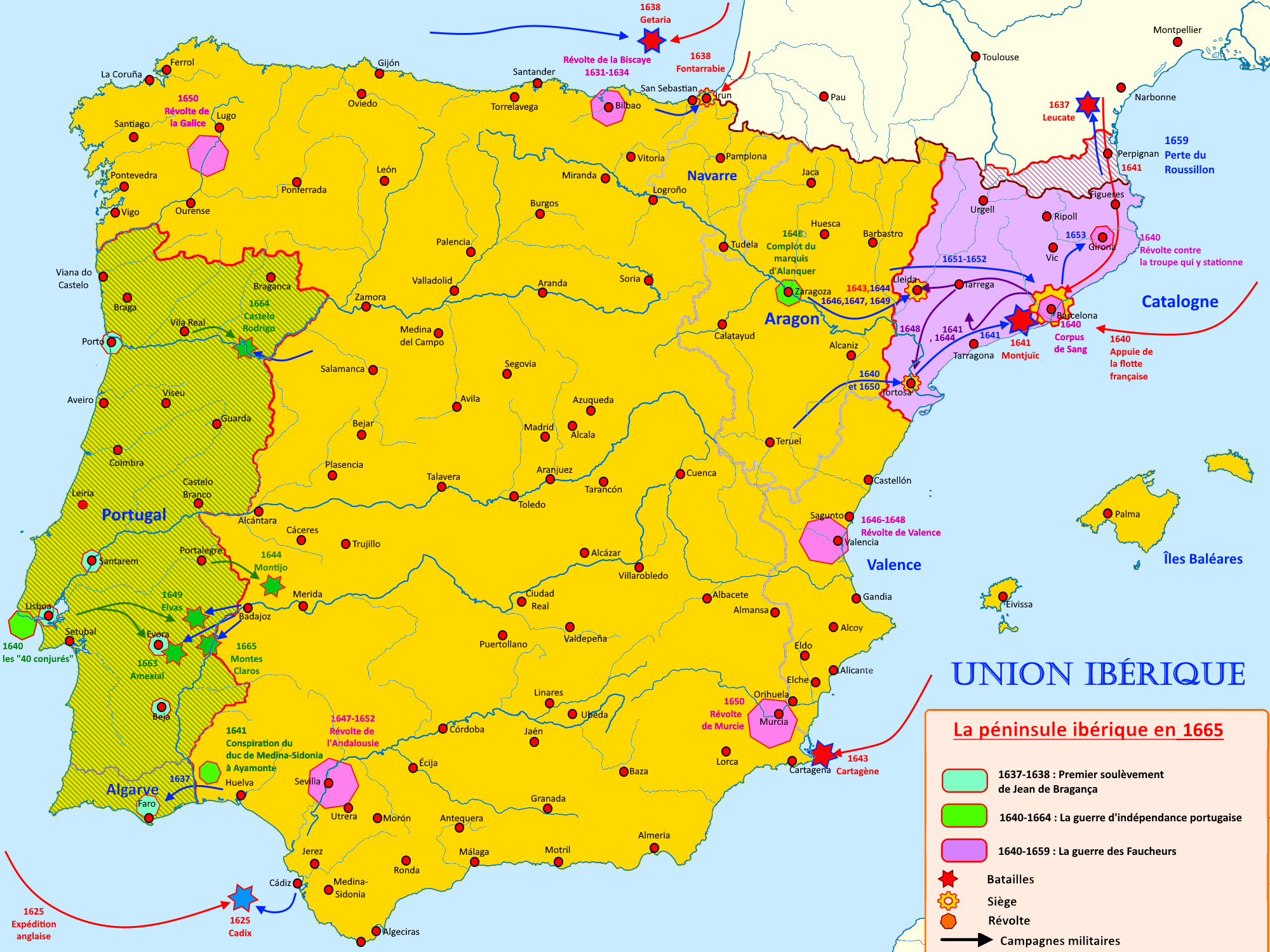
Location of the Catalan Republic in purple (western border inaccurate) in the context of the crisis of 1640

With the victory of the army of the Marquis of Los Vélez in Tarragona on 23 December it continued its advance towards Barcelona, while the French army of d'Espenan proceeded to leave Catalonia to France at the beginning of January 1641. Negotiations with the French intensified, on 3 January a delegation of three Catalans met with Cardinal Richelieu who assured them protection if they were an independent republic like Genoa. On 14 January du Plessis-Besançon went at the residence of the President of the Generalitat, Pau Claris, to still conferring. The massacre perpetrated by the Spanish armies in Cambrils on 16 December, a method similar to those carried out in the fight against the Dutch Republic, convinced Catalan leadership that they could not expect any pardon or negotiated solution from the Spanish king.

As a result of the negotiation, on 16 January, Pau Claris presented a proposal before the Junta de Braços by which the King of France agreed to put the Principality under his protection if Catalonia changed its government to a republic. On 16 January 1641, the Junta de Braços accepted the establishment of the Catalan Republic under French protection. However, a week later, following the defeat of the Catalan army in the Battle of Martorell, close to Barcelona, du Plessis-Besançon managed to convince the Catalan authorities that the help they needed could only be obtained from France if they recognized Louis XIII of France as sovereign. Pau Claris appealed on 23 January to Louis XIII, recognizing him as Count of Barcelona (as Louis I) and thus beginning the process to place the Principality of Catalonia in a personal union with the Kingdom of France.

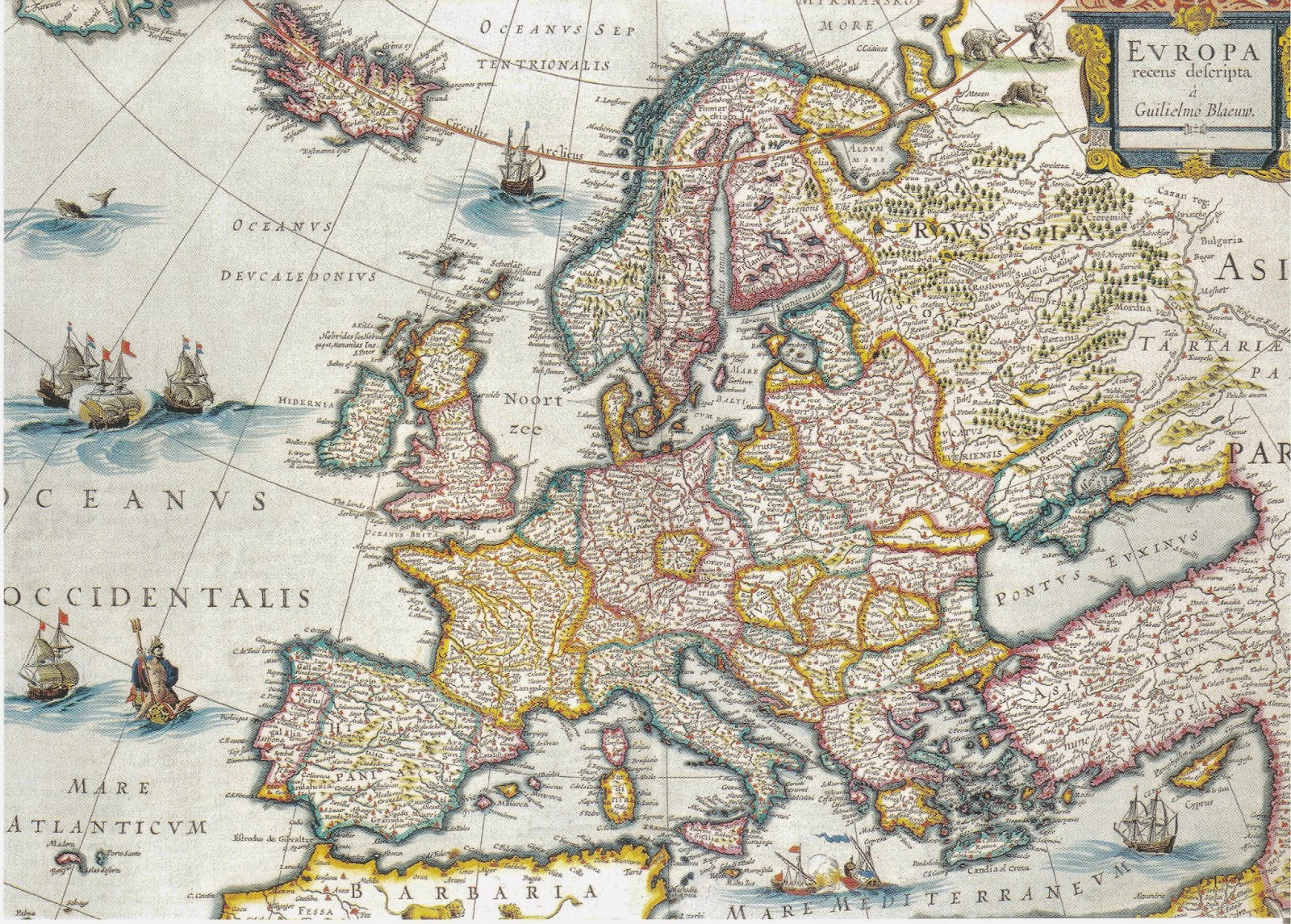
Map of Europe with the Catalan Republic (c. 1641) by Willem Blaeu

However, before the French king agreed to swear to the Catalan constitutions, almost a whole year passed, during which Catalonia was still governed without depending on any monarch, thus maintaining the republic in which the Junta de Braços and the Generalitat retained the real power. On 26 January 1641, as a result the Franco-Catalan victory in the Battle of Montjuïc, at the gates of Barcelona, the army of Philip IV had to withdraw. Pau Claris died a month later, probably poisoned by Spanish agents. His successor, Josep Soler, prepared the formal agreement of personal union between Catalonia and France, which was ratified by the Treaty of Peronne on 19 September 1641, and the Marquis of Brézé, Marshal of France, sworn the Constitutions of Catalonia in the name of the French monarch on 30 December 1641, being appointed as the first French viceroy of Catalonia.

== Aftermath ==
Louis XIV was titled as Count of Barcelona (as Louis II) in succession to his father in 1643. Finally, the dismissal of the Count-Duke of Olivares, the ravages caused by the famine and the plague, the commitment made by Philip IV to respect the Catalan constitutions and institutions in 1644, and the outbreak of the Fronde conflict in France allowed Philip's army to take Barcelona, thus reincoporating the Principality of Catalonia into the Monarchy of Spain. Then, the French armies and officers, as well as Catalans loyal to them, retreated to the northern side of the Pyrenees, retaining control of the Roussillon while maintaining the claim over the entirety of Catalonia until the division of the Principality between Spain and France by the Treaty of the Pyrenees, in 1659.

== See also ==
- List of republics
- Classical republicanism
- War of Restoration (Portugal)
- War of the Catalans
- Catalan Republic (1931)

== Bibliography ==
- Simon, Antoni (2019). 1640. Barcelona: Rafael Dalmau, Editor. ISBN 978-84-232-0851-7.
- Serra, Eva (1991). 1640: una revolució política. La implicació de les institucions. Barcelona: Crítica.
- Ferro, Víctor (1987). El Dret Públic Català. Les Institucions a Catalunya fins al Decret de Nova Planta. Vic: Ed. Eumo. ISBN 84-7602-203-4.
