= Battle of Martorell (1641) =

1641 battle

- Part of Reapers' War and the Franco-Spanish War (1635–59)
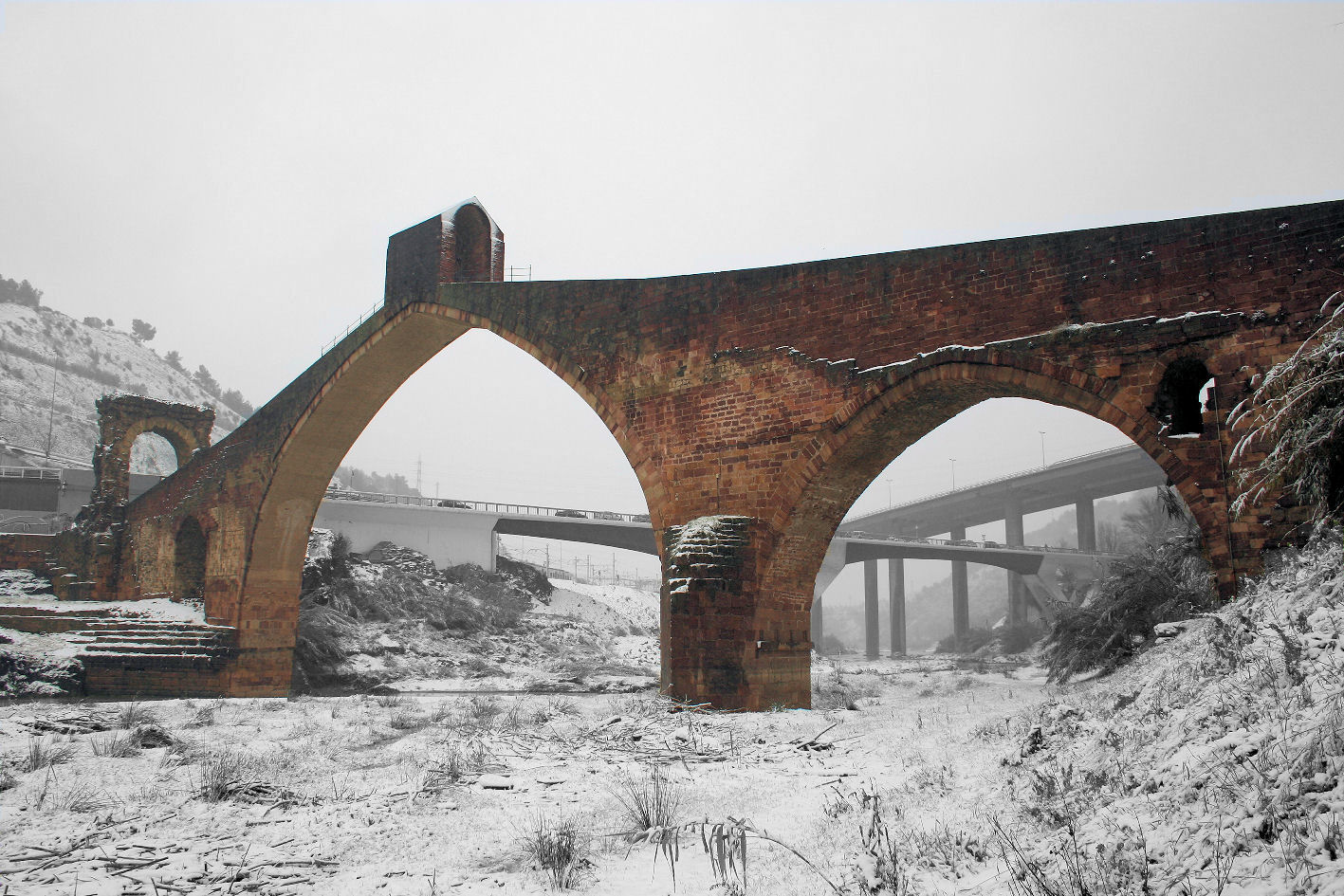
- Pont del Diable, from which the Catalan army retreated
| Date | 20–23 January 1641 |
| Location | Martorell, Catalonia 41°28′33″N 1°55′54″E |
| Result | Spanish victory |

Belligerents
| Catalan Republic | Habsburg Spain |

Commanders and leaders
| Francesc de Tamarit; Dídac Vergós | (Spain) Pedro Fajardo |
- Location within Catalonia Battle of Martorell (1641) (Spain)

The Battle of Martorell (Catalan: Batalla de Martorell) is one of the episodes of the Reapers' War in Catalonia that took place from 20 to 23 January 1641 and ended in a victory for the Spanish troops.

== History ==
In the spring of 1640, Francesc de Tamarit was imprisoned accused of not providing cams and accommodation to the army. Insurrectioned peasants entered Barcelona on 22 May and released it. On 7 June the same year, in the Corpus of Blood, groups of reapers entered the city again and the Viceroy of Catalonia Dalmau de Queralt was murdered.

In September, the army of Philip IV led by Pedro Fajardo, Marquess of Los Vélez occupied Tortosa in December and, after the battle of Cambrils, the city of Tarragona, moving towards Barcelona. Francesc de Vilaplana with two companies of Catalan cavalry and one of French not included in the surrender of Tarragona, watches the progress of the army of Los Vélez across the Penedès.

The Franco-Catalans decided to face the Spanish in Martorell, which became the headquarters of Catalan army after Roger de Bossost, Baron of Espenan, surrendered Tarragona and fled with his troops to France. Four days before the battle, the Junta de Braços (States-General) of the Principality of Catalonia, presided over by the President of the Generalitat, Pau Claris, established the Catalan Republic under the protection of France.

== Battle ==
Pedro Fajardo de Zúñiga and Requesens, Marquis de los Vélez sent a large contingent of troops on 20 January by Gelida and Castellví de Rosanes, in order to cut the possible retreat of the Catalan troops by the right bank of the Llobregat. But these troops were repulsed by the miquelets commanded by Dídac de Vergós.

The 21, the bulk of the Spanish royal army with infantry led by the Marquis de San Jorge, arrived to the Llobregat, provoking the retreat of the Catalan army from Martorell, who crossed the Pont del Diable (Devil's Bridge) while being covered by French artillery, so as not to be isolated. The Spanish entered the city provoking a new massacre. The mayor of Martorell was murdered when wearing the insignia of his charge, he tried to avoid the rampage. According to what appears, the Marquis de Los Vélez considered the Martorellencs doubly treacherous, to the King and to himself, because Martorell was a city under his lordship. When the Castilian cavalry led by the Marquis de Torrecuso crossed the Llobregat, the Catalans had to withdraw to Barcelona.

The rout of Martorell, with the presence of the Spanish army at the gates of Barcelona, pushed the Catalans to proclaim Louis XIII Count of Barcelona on 23 January, which sent an army in Catalonia to support his new subjects. However three days later, at the battle of Montjuïc, near Barcelona, on 26 December the Catalan and French armies defeated the Spanish troops.

== Bibliography ==
- Hernández, F. Xavier. Història militar de Catalunya ISBN 84-232-0638-6
