= 1640 in Catalonia =

- Decades
- See also: Other events of 1640; Timeline of Catalan history

Events from 1640 in Catalonia.

== Incumbents ==
- Count of Barcelona – Philip III (suspended after 10 September)
- President of the Generalitat of Catalonia – Pau Claris

== Events ==
- 28 January – The Spanish armies recovered the castle of Salses from French occupation.
- February–May – The Spanish soldiers remained in Catalonia, and the tensions between troops and Catalan peasants, who were forced to quarter them, increased.
- 3 May – Riudarenes, a village near to Girona, was burn by Spanish soldiers.
- 14 May – Santa Coloma de Farners was burnt by Spanish soldiers.
- 22 May – Rebels liberated the deputy of the Generalitat Francesc de Tamarit from prison.
- 7 June – Corpus de Sang. The reapers stationed in Barcelona and Sant Andreu del Palomar started a riot in which the Viceroy of Catalonia, Dalmau de Queralt, Count of Santa Coloma was killed.
- 7 September – Pact of Ceret between the Principality of Catalonia and the Kingdom of France, establishing a Franco-Catalan alliance.
- 10 September – Pau Claris, President of the Generalitat, summit the members of the Catalan Courts in order to form a Junta de Braços or Braços Generals (States-General), an extraordinary council, which assumes the sovereignty and suspends the Monarchy.
- 16 December – On its way to Barcelona, Spanish armies perpetrate the Cambrils massacre.
