= 1641 in Catalonia =

- Decades
- See also: Other events of 1641; Timeline of Catalan history

Events from 1641 in Catalonia.

== Incumbents ==
- Count of Barcelona – Louis I (from 30 December)
- President of the Generalitat of Catalonia – Pau Claris (until 26 January), Josep Soler (from 26 January)

== Events ==
- 17 January – The Junta de Braços (council of Estates) of the Principality of Catalonia, led by Pau Claris, accepts the proposal to establish the Catalan Republic under French protection.
- 23 January – In order to gain more military aid from France, the Junta de Braços proclaimed Louis XIII as Count of Barcelona.
- 26 January – Battle of Montjuïc, decisive Franco-Catalan victory over the Spanish armies.
- 30 December – Louis XIII swears the Catalan constitutions, being appointed as Louis I of Catalonia.

=== Undated ===
- Periodical publication of gazettes translated from French to Catalan begin in Catalonia in 1641 and continue into 1642 by several Barcelona printers.
