= Pau Claris i Casademunt =

Catalan lawyer & clergyman (1586-1641)

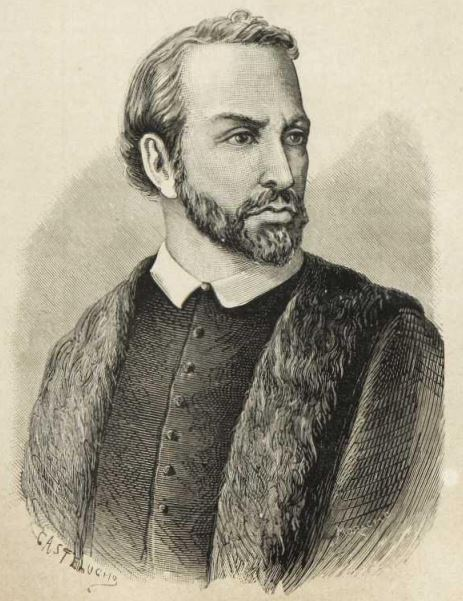

94th President of the Deputation of the General of Catalonia
- In office 22 July 1638 – 26 January 1641
- Preceded by: Miquel d'Alentorn i de Salbà
- Succeeded by: Josep Soler

1st President of the Catalan Republic
- In office 17 January 1641 – 23 January 1641
- Succeeded by: Baldomer Lostau; In 1873

Personal details
- Born: 1 January 1586 Barcelona
- Died: 27 February 1641 (aged 55) Barcelona
- Party: None

Pau Claris i Casademunt (Catalan pronunciation: [ˈpaw ˈklaɾiz i ˌkazəðəˈmun]; 1 January 1586 – 27 February 1641) was a Catalan lawyer, clergyman and 94th President of the Deputation of the General of Catalonia at the beginning of the Catalan Revolt. On 16 January 1641 he proclaimed the Catalan Republic under the protection of France.

== Biography ==
=== Early years ===
Claris was born in Barcelona (then in the Principality of Catalonia, part of the Spanish Monarchy). His paternal family was from Berga, and both his grandfather, Francesc, and his father, Joan, were prominent jurists in Barcelona. His mother was Peronella Casademunt. Pau was the youngest of four brothers, and his older brother, Francesc, was a lawyer who had a strong influence on his brother's path toward politics. The Claris family belonged to the Barcelonan bourgeois and had significant economic and administrative power.

While it is possible that his education may have been more extensive, it is only clear that Pau Claris received a doctorate in civil law and canon law from the University of Barcelona, and that he studied the course during the period between 1604 and 1612.

On 28 August 1612 Claris was appointed to work in La Seu d'Urgell, the seat of the Bishop of Urgell and Andorra. On 25 September the same year, he was appointed canon, and was assigned to the Diocese of Urgell.

=== Political career ===
In 1626, Claris was elected as a representative of the church at the Corts Catalanes (Parliament of Catalonia), which opened on 28 March amid a troublesome political situation after the new king of Spain, Philip IV, would not ratify the Catalan constitutions, due to tax reasons and the question of whether royal officers had to follow the Catalan law. The Catalan church had been exhausted by the royal taxes and was against the practice of nominating bishops from Castile to Catalan dioceses. The refusal to pay a tax of 3,300,000 ducats caused the immediate departure of the king to Madrid.

It was not until 1632 that the Parliament resumed, although with the same members as in 1626. At this time the rebellion against the Spanish crown was evident, led by a brilliant generation of lawyers, such as Joan Pere Fontanella, who was the legal advisor of both the Generalitat and the Consell de Cent (municipal government of Barcelona).

In 1632, Claris was appointed by the Ecclesiastical Arm of the government to treat the subject of an election, and on 15 July the estate appointed eighteen people - the Divuitena - that would form the role of the Executive Board.

The most remarkable political episode of this period of Claris' life were the riots of Vic. As a result of a papal concession that granted the king of Spain a tenth of the revenues of the Church in Spain, popular unrest virulently erupted in the diocese of Vic under the guidance of the archdeacon, Melcior Palau i Boscà, with the impassioned support of two canons of Urgell, Claris and Jaume Ferran.

The seizure of ecclesiastical property in Vic by the Royal Court caused revolutionary demonstrations, with defamatory libel and threats of subversion in the field during the spring and summer of 1634. Despite pressure from the bishop of Girona, the Council of Aragon only dared to imprison a dissident deacon, Pau Capfort. Finally, the conflict delayed the payment of the tenth until the end of November.

In 1630 and 1636, Claris attended the church's Councils of Tarragona. In 1636 he achieved approval of a provision whereby all sermons in the Principality would be in the Catalan language, in spite of the neutralizing efforts of the archbishop of Tarragona, the Spaniard Antonio Pérez.

=== The presidency of the Generalitat ===
On 22 July 1638 Pau Claris was elected ecclesiastical deputy of the Diputació del General. The other members chosen with Claris were Francesc de Tamarit and Josep Miquel Quintana as deputies of the Military and Royal Arms, and Jaume Ferran (also a canon from Urgell), Rafael Antic, and Rafael Cerdà as auditors of the Ecclesiastical, Military, and Royal Arms, respectively.

As the church deputy, Claris presided over the meetings of the Generalitat. According to historian J. H. Elliott, Dalmau de Queralt, Count of Santa Coloma and Viceroy of Catalonia, tried in vain to bribe Claris and Tamarit, individuals uncomfortable about their role in the service of the king.

Claris found a government with very grave economic problems, resulting from years of mismanagement, and conflict that opened with the Spanish Crown accusing the Generalitat of smuggling, due to a breach of the edicts of 1635 and 1638 that prohibited any kind of trade with France because of the Thirty Years' War. The intervention of the sheriff Montrodón, commissioned by Dalmau de Queralt to the warehouses of Mataró and Salses, triggered the conflict, in which the lawyer Joan Pere Fontanella again played a prominent role in favor of the theses of the Members of the Government. Although the city of Barcelona was initially reluctant, it sided with the Members in 1639, especially because of the decision of the Crown to establish a general recovery from Catalonia of 50,000 pounds annually for the years 1639 and 1640.

Behind this new effort was the eagerness of Philip IV and the Count-Duke of Olivares to have all the lands of the Spanish Crown contribute financially to the expenses incurred in the Thirty Years' War, which had already devastated Castile economically. Catalonia had never felt that this conflict was its own. Olivares, to counterbalance this situation, wanted to launch a front against France from Catalonia with Catalan help. On 19 July 1639 the French besieged and took the Fort de Salses in Roussillon. This initiated a severe struggle between the Count-Duke and the Generalitat to increase the Catalan efforts in the war. Finally, the deputies agreed to send Francesc de Tamarit to the front of a new draft of soldiers to recover the castle of Salses, which was achieved on 6 January 1640 (the feastday of the Epiphany). However, the cost in human lives and money for the principality was so great that the situation became explosive.

=== The Revolt ===
Regardless of the actual date that contacts with France began, it would end with the formation of a Catalan-French alliance that confronted the Spanish Crown and gave rise to the so-called Reapers' War or Catalan Revolt. Although it remains a controversial issue among historians, it seems that they could have already started in the month of May 1640. Pau Claris had summoned the general court on 10 September 1640 but simultaneously, and without consulting the cities, would have begun the contacts with the French.

On 7 September 1640 the representatives of the Generality of Catalonia, Francesc de Tamarit, Ramon de Guimerà, and Francesc de Vilaplana, nephew of Claris, signed the first Pact of Céret with Bernard Du Plessis-Besançon, delegated by Armand Jean du Plessis de Richelieu, Cardinal-Duc de Richelieu on behalf of Louis XIII, for which Catalonia had received military support aimed at facing the Castilian offensive commanded by the Count-Duke of Olivares, who had already decided to intervene in Catalonia. It is believed that in front of the Castilian military pressure, Claris was seen to be progressively driven to accept a counter-course to French pressure, in which Catalonia would separate itself from the Spanish Monarchy and would take the form of a Free Republic under the protection of the French king.

The personal assumption of power by Claris' staff from September 1640, appeared to be total. A Council of Arms (Junta General de Braços) was summoned and set up as the ruling institution of the new situation, the commitments with France and the secession were made official, and public debt was issued for funding the military expenses.

On 20 October 1640 Du Plessis-Besançon went to Barcelona, and some days afterwards, he signed the first pact of confraternity and military aid from France to Catalonia, by which France was engaged to defend the Principality.

=== Catalan Republic ===
On 24 November the Spanish army under Pedro Fajardo, the Marquis of Los Vélez, invaded Catalonia from the south. On 23 December Pau Claris raised the alarm and declared war against Philip IV of Spain. The victorious advance of the Castilian troops through Tortosa, Cambrils, Tarragona, and Martorell forced the Council of Arms and Consell de Cent to yield to the French pressures, and on 16 and 17 January respectively, the Junta and Consell accepted the proposal to constitute Catalonia into a republic under the protection of France.

But again the pressure of the Castilians who approached Barcelona, and the French pretensions toward Catalonia, brought Claris to have to end the republican project and proclaim Louis XIII the Count of Barcelona on 23 January 1641, three days before the Battle of Montjuïc in which the French and Catalan armies defeated the Castilian forces and stopped the attack in Barcelona. With the "Treaty of the Pyrenees" signed on 7 November 1659, ended the Franco-Spanish War that had begun in 1635. France gained Roussillon (including Perpignan) and the northern half of Cerdanya which was separated from Catalonia as result of the Catalan revolt and Pau Claris international politics tacticism.

=== Death ===
On 20 February 1641 Claris fell gravely ill, the same day that Philippe de La Mothe-Houdancourt arrived in Barcelona with the powers of commander-in-chief of all French and Catalan armies. The following day Claris received the last rites, and he died on the night of 27 February. Despite the fact that he had health problems for at least a year, the theory of a possible poisoning circulated since the first moment, as noted in a letter from Roger de Bossost, Baron d'Espenan, to du Plessis-Besançon; some modern investigations support this possibility.

Claris was placed in the family crypt of the chapel of the Holy Christ in the Church of Sant Joan de Jerusalem in Barcelona. Unfortunately the church was demolished in 1888 as part of the urban reformation for the upcoming Universal Exhibition of Barcelona.

== Monuments and Honors ==
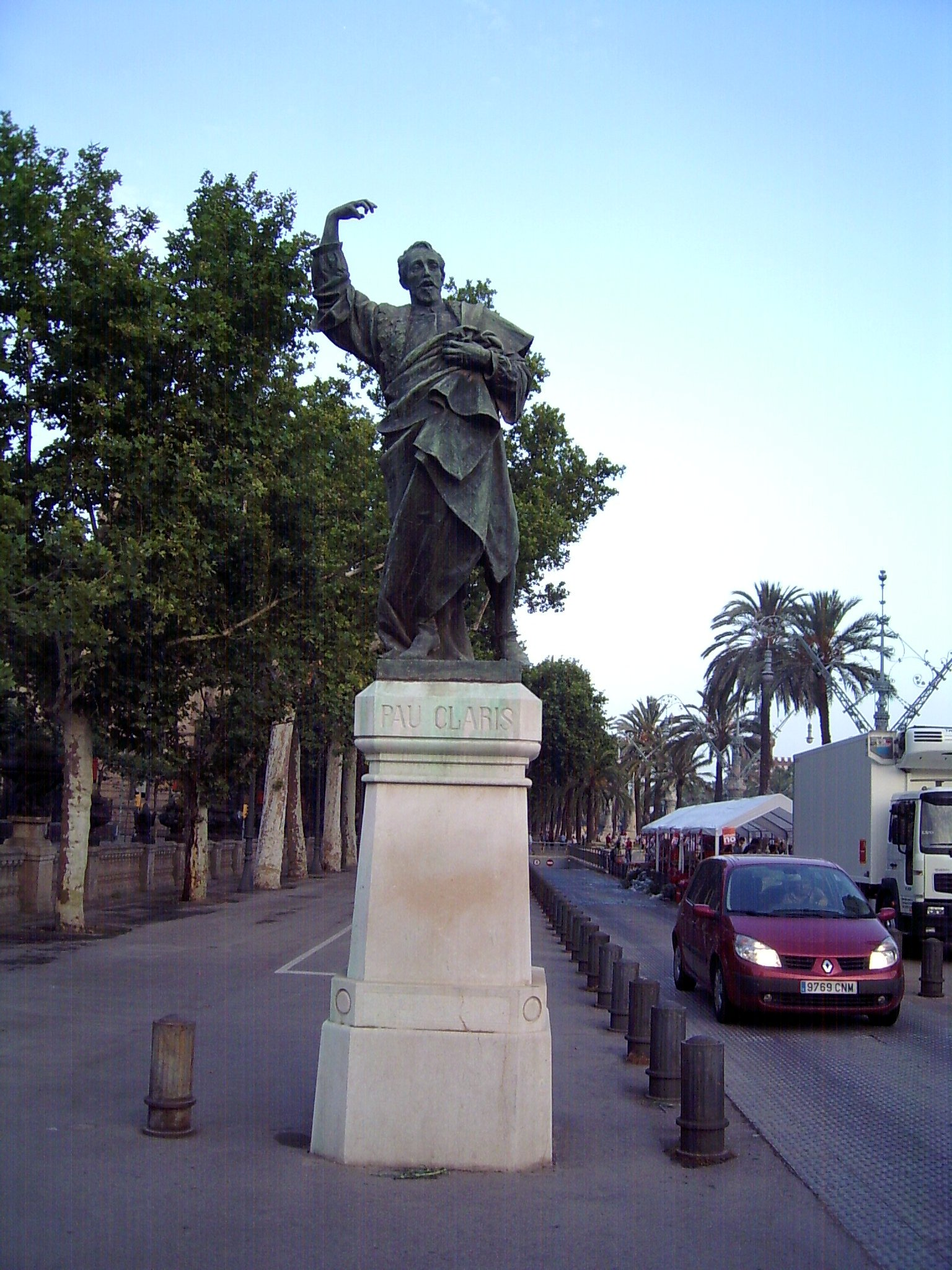
Monument to Pau Claris by Rafael Atché i Ferré, on the Passeig de Lluís Companys, Barcelona

In Barcelona, several monuments have been raised to Claris, the best known of which is the statue located at the end of the Passeig de Lluís Companys. Created by Rafael Atché i Ferré and dedicated in 1917, it was withdrawn and saved during the Spanish Civil War and repositioned in 1977. Right from its dedication, but with interruptions due to the war and the subsequent political persecution of the Catalan culture, the place has become a meeting point and commemoration of the political sensitivities on the brink of Catalan independence.

In Barcelona, in the district of Eixample, there is the Carrer de Pau Claris. It starts in Avinguda Diagonal and ends in Plaça Urquinaona. Many other towns in Catalonia have streets and squares dedicated to his recognition. There is also a school in his name on the Passeig de Lluís Companys in Barcelona.

The same year of his death, Francesc Fontanella published Panegíric a La Mort De Pau Claris De Francesc Fontanella.

== Bibliography ==
- Garcia Càrcel, Ricard (1980). Pau Claris, La Revolta Catalana. Pinya de rosa, 36 (in Catalan). Barcelona: Dopesa. ISBN 84-7235-450-4. OCLC 7999620.
- Simón i Tarrés, Antoni (2008). Pau Claris, Líder D'una Classe Revolucionària. Biblioteca Abat Oliva (in Catalan). Barcelona: Publicacions de l'Abadia de Montserrat. ISBN 978-84-9883-051-4. OCLC 401167750.
