= June 7 =

Events on calendar date 7 June

June 7 this year in various calendars
- Sunday, 7 June 2026
Akan	Kurukwasi
Armenian	22 Margach 1475
Aztec	Teotleco 8, 6 Cōzcacuāuhtli
Babylonian	20 Ayaru, 2337 SE
Balinese pawukon	Luang, Pepet, Pasah, Menala, Keliwon, Paniron, Redite of Sungsang, Uma, Urungan, Duka
Bengali	24 Joishtho, BS 1433
Chinese	Yang Water Rat・Emptiness Mansion; Fire Horse Year, Month 4, Day 22 (Mangzhong, 14 days until Xiazhi)
Common Era	7 June 2026 CE
Coptic	30 Pashons, AM 1742
Egyptian	22 Phaophi, 2775 NE
Ethiopian	30 Genbot, 2018 Amätä Məhrät
French Republican	Décade II, Nonidi de Prairial de l'Année 234 de la République
Gregorian	7 June, AD 2026
Hebrew	22 Sivan, AM 5786
Hindu	Śatabhiṣaj・Vaidhṛti; Solar: 24 Jyeṣṭha, 1948 SE; Lunisolar: Saptamī, Kṛishna pakṣa of Adhika Jyeṣṭha, 2083 VE; Rāudra・5127 KY・1,872,733
Icelandic	Sunnudagur, 16 Skerpla 2026
Islamic	21 Dhu al-Hijjah, AH 1447 (using tabular method)
ISO week date	2026-W23-7
Japanese	22 Uzuki, Reiwa 8 (Bōshu, 14 days until Geshi)
Julian	25 May, AD 2026 (AM 7534)
Julian day	2461199
Korean	22 Baemdal, 4359 DE
Maya	13.0.13.11.16; 9 Zotz, 6 Cib
Roman	ante diem VIII Kalendas Iunias, MMDCCLXXIX AUC
Solar Hijri	17 Khordad, SH 1405
Tibetan	22 sa ga, me pho rta 2153 or 1772 or 1000

<<	June					>>
Su	Mo	Tu	We	Th	Fr	Sa
	1	2	3	4	5	6
7	8	9	10	11	12	13
14	15	16	17	18	19	20
21	22	23	24	25	26	27
28	29	30
2026

June 7 in recent years
2026 (Sunday)
2025 (Saturday)
2024 (Friday)
2023 (Wednesday)
2022 (Tuesday)
2021 (Monday)
2020 (Sunday)
2019 (Friday)
2018 (Thursday)
2017 (Wednesday)

June 7 is the 158th day of the year (159th in leap years) in the Gregorian calendar; 207 days remain until the end of the year.

== Events ==
=== Pre-1600 ===
- 421 – Emperor Theodosius II marries Aelia Eudocia at Constantinople (Byzantine Empire).
- 879 – Pope John VIII recognises the Duchy of Croatia under Duke Branimir as an independent state.
- 1002 – Henry II, a cousin of Emperor Otto III, is elected and crowned King of Germany.
- 1099 – First Crusade: The Siege of Jerusalem begins.
- 1420 – Troops of the Republic of Venice capture Udine, ending the independence of the Patria del Friuli.
- 1494 – Spain and Portugal sign the Treaty of Tordesillas which divides the New World between the two countries.

=== 1601–1900 ===
- 1614 – The second parliament of James I of England ends after two months of deadlock and without passing any bills.
- 1628 – The Petition of Right, a major English constitutional document, is granted royal assent by Charles I and becomes law.
- 1640 – Corpus de Sang in Barcelona: Catalan reapers riot against Spanish Royal soldiers and officers, killing the Viceroy of Catalonia, Dalmau de Queralt. Escalation of hostilities between the Principality of Catalonia and the Spanish Monarchy, leading to the Reapers' War.
- 1654 – Louis XIV is crowned King of France.
- 1692 – Port Royal, Jamaica, is hit by a catastrophic earthquake; in just three minutes, 1,600 people are killed and 3,000 are seriously injured.
- 1776 – American Revolution: Richard Henry Lee proposes the "Lee Resolution" to the Second Continental Congress, with the motion being seconded by John Adams and leading to the United States Declaration of Independence.
- 1788 – French Revolution: Day of the Tiles: Civilians in Grenoble toss roof tiles and various objects down upon royal troops.
- 1800 – David Thompson reaches the mouth of the Saskatchewan River in Manitoba.
- 1810 – The newspaper Gazeta de Buenos Ayres is first published in Argentina.
- 1832 – The Great Reform Act of England and Wales receives royal assent.
- 1832 – Asian cholera reaches Quebec, brought by Irish immigrants, and kills about 6,000 people in Lower Canada.
- 1862 – The United States and the United Kingdom agree in the Lyons–Seward Treaty to suppress the African slave trade.
- 1866 – One thousand eight hundred Fenian raiders are repelled back to the United States after looting and plundering the Saint-Armand and Frelighsburg areas of Canada East.
- 1880 – War of the Pacific: The Battle of Arica, the assault and capture of Morro de Arica (Arica Cape), ends the Campaña del Desierto (Desert Campaign).
- 1892 – Homer Plessy is arrested for refusing to leave his seat in the "whites-only" car of a train; he lost the resulting court case, Plessy v. Ferguson.
- 1899 – American Temperance crusader Carrie Nation begins her campaign of vandalizing alcohol-serving establishments by destroying the inventory in a saloon in Kiowa, Kansas.

=== 1901–present ===
- 1905 – Norway's parliament dissolves its union with Sweden. The vote was confirmed by a national plebiscite on August 13 of that year.
- 1906 – Cunard Line's RMS Lusitania is launched from the John Brown Shipyard, Glasgow (Clydebank), Scotland.
- 1917 – World War I: Battle of Messines: Allied soldiers detonate a series of mines underneath German trenches at Messines Ridge, killing 10,000 German troops.
- 1919 – Sette Giugno: Nationalist riots break out in Valletta, the capital of Malta. British soldiers fire into the crowd, killing four people.
- 1929 – The Lateran Treaty is ratified, bringing Vatican City into existence.
- 1938 – The Douglas DC-4E makes its first test flight.
- 1938 – Second Sino-Japanese War: The Chinese Nationalist government creates the 1938 Yellow River flood to halt Japanese forces. Five hundred thousand to nine hundred thousand civilians are killed.
- 1940 – King Haakon VII, Crown Prince Olav and the Norwegian government leave Tromsø and go into exile in London. They return exactly five years later.
- 1942 – World War II: The Battle of Midway ends in American victory.
- 1942 – World War II: Aleutian Islands Campaign: Imperial Japanese soldiers begin occupying the American islands of Attu and Kiska, in the Aleutian Islands off Alaska.
- 1944 – World War II: Battle of Normandy: At Ardenne Abbey, members of the SS Division Hitlerjugend massacre 23 Canadian prisoners of war.
- 1945 – King Haakon VII of Norway returns from exactly five years in exile during World War II.
- 1946 – The United Kingdom's BBC returns to broadcasting its television service, which has been off air for seven years because of World War II.
- 1948 – Anti-Jewish riots in Oujda and Jerada take place.
- 1948 – Edvard Beneš resigns as President of Czechoslovakia rather than signing the Ninth-of-May Constitution, making his nation a Communist state.
- 1955 – Lux Radio Theatre signs off the air permanently. The show launched in New York in 1934, and featured radio adaptations of Broadway shows and popular films.
- 1962 – The Organisation Armée Secrète (OAS) sets fire to the University of Algiers library building, destroying about 500,000 books.
- 1965 – The Supreme Court of the United States hands down its decision in Griswold v. Connecticut, prohibiting the states from criminalizing the use of contraception by married couples.
- 1967 – Six-Day War: Israeli soldiers enter Jerusalem.
- 1971 – The United States Supreme Court overturns the conviction of Paul Cohen for disturbing the peace, setting the precedent that vulgar writing is protected under the First Amendment to the United States Constitution.
- 1971 – The Alcohol, Tobacco, and Firearms Division of the U.S. Internal Revenue Service raids the home of Ken Ballew for illegal possession of hand grenades.
- 1971 – Allegheny Airlines Flight 485 crashes on approach to Tweed New Haven Airport in New Haven, Connecticut, killing 28 of 31 aboard.
- 1975 – Sony launches Betamax, the first videocassette recorder format.
- 1977 – Five hundred million people watch the high day of the Silver Jubilee of Queen Elizabeth II begin on television.
- 1981 – The Israeli Air Force destroys Iraq's Osiraq nuclear reactor during Operation Opera.
- 1982 – Priscilla Presley opens Graceland to the public; the bathroom where Elvis Presley died five years earlier is kept off-limits.
- 1989 – Surinam Airways Flight 764 crashes on approach to Paramaribo-Zanderij International Airport in Suriname because of pilot error, killing 176 of 187 aboard.
- 1991 – Mount Pinatubo erupts, generating an ash column 7 kilometres (4.3 mi) high.
- 2000 – The United Nations defines the Blue Line as the border between Israel and Lebanon.
- 2017 – A Myanmar Air Force Shaanxi Y-8 crashes into the Andaman Sea near Dawei, Myanmar, killing all 122 aboard.

== Births ==
=== Pre-1600 ===
- 1003 – Emperor Jingzong of Western Xia (died 1048)
- 1402 – Ichijō Kaneyoshi, Japanese noble (died 1481)
- 1422 – Federico da Montefeltro, Italian condottiero (died 1482)
- 1502 – John III of Portugal (died 1557)
- 1529 – Étienne Pasquier, French lawyer and jurist (died 1615)
- 1561 – John VII, Count of Nassau-Siegen, German count and military theorist (died 1623)

=== 1601–1900 ===
- 1687 – Gaetano Berenstadt, Italian actor and singer (died 1734)
- 1702 – Louis George, Margrave of Baden-Baden (died 1761)
- 1757 – Georgiana Cavendish, Duchess of Devonshire (died 1806)
- 1761 – John Rennie the Elder, Scottish engineer (died 1821)
- 1770 – Robert Jenkinson, 2nd Earl of Liverpool, English politician, Prime Minister of the United Kingdom (died 1828)
- 1778 – Beau Brummell, English cricketer and fashion designer (died 1840)
- 1811 – James Young Simpson, Scottish obstetrician (died 1870)
- 1831 – Amelia Edwards, English journalist and author (died 1892)
- 1837 – Alois Hitler, Austrian civil servant (died 1903)
- 1840 – Carlota of Mexico (died 1927)
- 1843 – Susan Blow, American educator (died 1916)
- 1845 – Leopold Auer, Hungarian violinist, composer, and conductor (died 1930)
- 1847 – George Washington Ball, American legislator from Iowa (died 1915)
- 1848 – Paul Gauguin, French painter and sculptor (died 1903)
- 1851 – Ture Malmgren, Swedish journalist and politician (died 1922)
- 1861 – Robina Nicol, New Zealand photographer and suffragist (died 1942)
- 1862 – Philipp Lenard, Slovak-German physicist and academic, Nobel Prize laureate (died 1947)
- 1863 – Bones Ely, American baseball player and manager (died 1952)
- 1868 – Charles Rennie Mackintosh, Scottish painter and architect (died 1928)
- 1877 – Roelof Klein, Dutch-American rower and engineer (died 1960)
- 1879 – Knud Rasmussen, Danish anthropologist and explorer (died 1933)
- 1879 – Joan Voûte, Dutch astronomer and academic (died 1963)
- 1883 – Sylvanus Morley, American archaeologist and scholar (died 1948)
- 1884 – Ester Claesson, Swedish landscape architect (died 1931)
- 1886 – Henri Coandă, Romanian engineer, designed the Coandă-1910 (died 1972)
- 1888 – Clarence DeMar, American runner and educator (died 1958)
- 1890 – Karl Lashley, American psychologist and behaviorist (died 1958)
- 1892 – Leo Reise, Canadian ice hockey player (died 1975)
- 1893 – Gillis Grafström, Swedish figure skater and architect (died 1938)
- 1894 – Alexander P. de Seversky, Georgian-American pilot and engineer, co-designed the Republic P-47 Thunderbolt (died 1974)
- 1896 – Douglas Campbell, American lieutenant and pilot (died 1990)
- 1896 – Robert S. Mulliken, American physicist and chemist, Nobel Prize laureate (died 1986)
- 1896 – Imre Nagy, Hungarian soldier and politician, 44th Prime Minister of Hungary (died 1958)
- 1897 – George Szell, Hungarian-American conductor and composer (died 1970)
- 1899 – Elizabeth Bowen, Anglo-Irish author and critic (died 1973)
- 1900 – Frederick Terman, American engineering professor and academic administrator, nicknamed "the father of Silicon Valley." (died 1982)

=== 1901–present ===
- 1900 – Glen Gray, American saxophonist and bandleader (died 1963)
- 1905 – James J. Braddock, American world heavyweight boxing champion (died 1974)
- 1907 – Sigvard Bernadotte, Count of Wisborg (died 2002)
- 1909 – Virginia Apgar, American anesthesiologist and pediatrician, developed the Apgar test (died 1974)
- 1909 – Jessica Tandy, English-American actress (died 1994)
- 1910 – Til Kiwe, German actor and screenwriter (died 1995)
- 1910 – Mike Sebastian, American football player and coach (died 1989)
- 1910 – Marion Post Wolcott, American photographer (died 1990)
- 1910 – Bluey, Australian Cattle Dog, second-oldest recorded dog (died 1939)
- 1911 – Brooks Stevens, American engineer and designer, designed the Wienermobile (died 1995)
- 1917 – Gwendolyn Brooks, American poet (died 2000)
- 1917 – Dean Martin, American singer, actor, and producer (died 1995)
- 1920 – Georges Marchais, French mechanic and politician (died 1997)
- 1921 – Tal Farlow, American jazz guitarist (died 1998)
- 1923 – Jules Deschênes, Canadian lawyer and judge (died 2000)
- 1925 – Ernestina Herrera de Noble, Argentine publisher and executive (died 2017)
- 1926 – Jean-Noël Tremblay, Canadian lawyer and politician (died 2020)
- 1927 – Paul Salamunovich, American conductor and educator (died 2014)
- 1927 – Herbert R. Axelrod, American tropical fish expert, publisher of pet books, and entrepreneur (died 2017)
- 1928 – James Ivory, American director, producer, and screenwriter
- 1928 – Charles Strouse, American composer (died 2025)
- 1929 – John Turner, Canadian lawyer and politician, 17th Prime Minister of Canada (died 2020)
- 1931 – Virginia McKenna, English actress and author
- 1936 – Pippo Baudo, Italian television presenter (died 2025)
- 1938 – Ian St John, Scottish international footballer and manager (died 2021)
- 1939 – Yuli Turovsky, Russian-Canadian cellist, conductor and educator (died 2013)
- 1940 – Tom Jones, Welsh singer and actor
- 1940 – Ronald Pickup, English actor (died 2021)
- 1941 – Lady Elizabeth Shakerley, British party planner, writer and socialite (died 2020)
- 1943 – Nikki Giovanni, American poet, writer and activist (died 2024)
- 1943 – "Superstar" Billy Graham, American wrestler (died 2023)
- 1944 – Neil Andrew, Australian politician and former Speaker of the Australian House of Representatives (died 2026)
- 1945 – Wolfgang Schüssel, Austrian lawyer and politician, 26th Chancellor of Austria
- 1946 – Jenny Jones, Canadian television presenter and comedian
- 1946 – Zbigniew Seifert, Polish musician (died 1979)
- 1947 – Thurman Munson, American baseball player (died 1979)
- 1951 – Philip Davis, Bahamian politician, 5th Prime Minister of the Bahamas
- 1952 – Liam Neeson, Irish-American actor
- 1952 – Orhan Pamuk, Turkish-American novelist, screenwriter, and academic, Nobel Prize laureate
- 1953 – Colleen Camp, American actress and producer
- 1954 – Louise Erdrich, American novelist and poet
- 1955 – William Forsythe, American actor
- 1956 – L.A. Reid, American record executive and producer
- 1957 – Juan Luis Guerra, Dominican singer, composer, and record producer
- 1958 – Prince, American singer-songwriter, multi-instrumentalist, producer, and actor (died 2016)
- 1959 – Mike Pence, 48th Vice President of the United States, 50th Governor of Indiana
- 1960 – Jim Hartung, American gymnast (died 2026)
- 1962 – Lance Reddick, American actor (died 2023)
- 1963 – Gordon Gano, American musician
- 1965 – Damien Hirst, English painter and art collector
- 1965 – Mick Foley, American wrestler
- 1967 – Dave Navarro, American musician and television personality
- 1967 – Muhsin Hendricks, South African imam, Islamic scholar and LGBT activist
- 1970 – Helen Baxendale, English actress
- 1970 – Cafu, Brazilian footballer
- 1972 – Karl Urban, New Zealand actor
- 1974 – Bear Grylls, English adventurer, author, and television host
- 1975 – Allen Iverson, American basketball player
- 1976 – Eric D. Johnson, American musician
- 1978 – Adrienne Frantz, American actress
- 1978 – Bill Hader, American actor and comedian
- 1979 – Anna Torv, Australian actress
- 1981 – Larisa Oleynik, American actress
- 1988 – Michael Cera, Canadian actor and musician
- 1990 – Iggy Azalea, Australian rapper, singer, songwriter, and model
- 1991 – Rasmus Vestergaard Madsen, Danish politician
- 1991 – Emily Ratajkowski, American model and actress
- 1991 – Fetty Wap, American rapper, singer, and songwriter
- 1992 – Jordan Clarkson, Filipino-American basketball player
- 1993 – George Ezra, English singer-songwriter
- 1993 – Swae Lee, American rapper
- 1996 – Christian McCaffrey, American football player
- 1997 – David Montgomery, American football player
- 2000 – Ōnosato Daiki, Japanese professional sumo wrestler and the 75th yokozuna

== Deaths ==
=== Pre-1600 ===
- 555 – Vigilius, first pope of the Byzantine Papacy (born 500)
- 862 – Al-Muntasir, Abbasid caliph (born 837)
- 929 – Ælfthryth, Countess of Flanders (born 877)
- 940 – Qian Hongzun, heir apparent of Wuyue (born 925)
- 951 – Lu Wenji, Chinese chancellor (born 876)
- 1329 – Robert the Bruce, Scottish king (born 1274)
- 1337 – William I, Count of Hainaut (born 1286)
- 1341 – An-Nasir Muhammad, Egyptian sultan (born 1285)
- 1358 – Ashikaga Takauji, Japanese shōgun (born 1305)
- 1394 – Anne of Bohemia, Princess of Bohemia and Queen Consort of England (born 1366)
- 1492 – Casimir IV Jagiellon, Grand Duke of Lithuania from 1440 and King of Poland from 1447 (born 1427)
- 1594 – Rodrigo Lopez, physician of Queen Elizabeth I (born 1525)

=== 1601–1900 ===
- 1618 – Thomas West, 3rd Baron De La Warr, English politician, Colonial Governor of Virginia (born 1577)
- 1660 – George II Rákóczi, Prince of Transylvania (born 1621)
- 1711 – Henry Dodwell, Irish scholar and theologian (born 1641)
- 1740 – Alexander Spotswood, Moroccan-American colonial and politician, Lieutenant Governor of Virginia (born 1676)
- 1779 – William Warburton, English bishop and critic (born 1698)
- 1792 – Benjamin Tupper, American general and surveyor (born 1738)
- 1810 – Luigi Schiavonetti, Italian engraver and etcher (born 1765)
- 1826 – Joseph von Fraunhofer, German optician, physicist, and astronomer (born 1787)
- 1840 – Frederick William III of Prussia (born 1770)
- 1843 – Friedrich Hölderlin, German lyric poet and author (born 1770)
- 1853 – Norbert Provencher, Canadian missionary and bishop (born 1787)
- 1854 – Charles Baudin, French admiral (born 1792)
- 1859 – David Cox, English painter (born 1783)
- 1861 – Patrick Brontë, Anglo-Irish priest and author (born 1777)
- 1863 – Antonio Valero de Bernabé, Latin American liberator (born 1790)
- 1866 – Chief Seattle, American tribal chief (born 1780)
- 1879 – William Tilbury Fox, English dermatologist and academic (born 1836)
- 1896 – Pavlos Carrer, Greek composer (born 1829)

=== 1901–present ===
- 1911 – Maurice Rouvier, French politician, Prime Minister of France (born 1842)
- 1915 – Charles Reed Bishop, American banker and politician, founded the First Hawaiian Bank (born 1822)
- 1916 – Émile Faguet, French author and critic (born 1847)
- 1921 – Patrick Maher, executed Irish republican (born 1889)
- 1921 – Edmond Foley, executed Irish republican (born 1897)
- 1924 – William Pirrie, 1st Viscount Pirrie, Irish businessman and politician, Lord Mayor of Belfast (born 1847)
- 1927 – Archie Birkin, English motorcycle racer (born 1905)
- 1927 – Edmund James Flynn, Canadian lawyer and politician, 10th Premier of Quebec (born 1847)
- 1932 – John Verran, English-Australian politician, 26th Premier of South Australia (born 1856)
- 1933 – Dragutin Domjanić, Croatian lawyer, judge, and poet (born 1875)
- 1936 – Stjepan Seljan, Croatian explorer (born 1875)
- 1937 – Jean Harlow, American actress and singer (born 1911)
- 1942 – Alan Blumlein, English engineer (born 1903)
- 1945 – Kitaro Nishida, Japanese philosopher and academic (born 1870)
- 1954 – Alan Turing, English mathematician and computer scientist (born 1912)
- 1956 – John Willcock, Australian politician, 15th Premier of Western Australia (born 1879)
- 1965 – Judy Holliday, American actress and singer (born 1921)
- 1966 – Jean Arp, German-French sculptor, painter, and poet (born 1886)
- 1967 – Anatoly Maltsev, Russian mathematician and academic (born 1909)
- 1967 – Dorothy Parker, American poet, short story writer, critic, and satirist (born 1893)
- 1968 – Dan Duryea, American actor and singer (born 1907)
- 1970 – E. M. Forster, English novelist, short story writer, essayist (born 1879)
- 1978 – Ronald George Wreyford Norrish, English chemist and academic, Nobel Prize laureate (born 1897)
- 1980 – Elizabeth Craig, Scottish journalist and economist (born 1883)
- 1980 – Philip Guston, Canadian-American painter and educator (born 1913)
- 1980 – Henry Miller, American novelist and essayist (born 1891)
- 1985 – Klaudia Taev, Estonian opera singer and educator (born 1906)
- 1987 – Cahit Zarifoğlu, Turkish poet and author (born 1940)
- 1992 – Bill France Sr., American race car driver and businessman, co-founded NASCAR (born 1909)
- 1995 – Hsuan Hua, Chinese monk and educator (born 1918)
- 2001 – Víctor Paz Estenssoro, Bolivian politician, 52nd President of Bolivia (born 1907)
- 2001 – Betty Neels, English nurse and author (born 1910)
- 2002 – Signe Hasso, Swedish-American actress (born 1915)
- 2006 – Abu Musab al-Zarqawi, Jordanian militant (born 1966)
- 2012 – Phillip V. Tobias, South African paleontologist and academic (born 1925)
- 2013 – Pierre Mauroy, French educator and politician, Prime Minister of France (born 1928)
- 2013 – Richard Ramirez, American serial killer and sex offender (born 1960)
- 2015 – Christopher Lee, English actor (born 1922)
- 2023 – The Iron Sheik, Iranian-American wrestler and actor (born 1942)
- 2024 – William Anders, American astronaut and lunar explorer (born 1933)
- 2025 – Uriah Rennie, English association football referee (born 1959)

== Holidays and observances ==
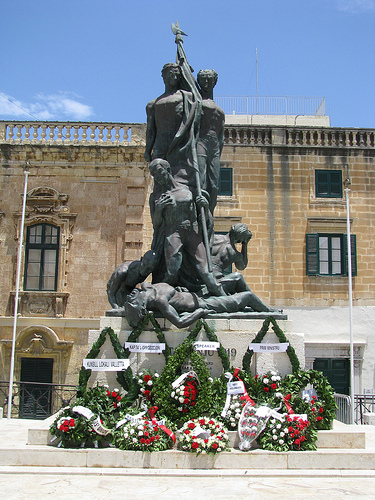
The Sette Giugno monument, in its original location in Palace Square, Valletta

- Christian feast day:
  - Blessed Anne of Saint Bartholomew
  - Antonio Maria Gianelli
  - Colmán of Dromore
  - Gottschalk
  - Landulf of Yariglia (Asti)
  - Meriasek
  - Paul I of Constantinople
  - Robert of Newminster
  - Chief Seattle (Lutheran Church)
  - Blessed Marie-Thérèse de Soubiran La Louvière
  - Commemoration Day of St John the Forerunner (Armenian Apostolic Church)
  - Pioneers of the Episcopal Anglican Church of Brazil (Episcopal Church (USA))
  - June 7 (Eastern Orthodox liturgics)
- Battle of Arica Day (Arica y Parinacota Region, Chile)
- Flag Day (Peru)
- Journalist Day (Argentina)
- Anniversary of the Memorandum of the Slovak Nation (Slovakia)
- Birthday of Prince Joachim (Denmark)
- Sette Giugno (Malta)
- Union Dissolution Day (Independence Day of Norway)
- Tourette Syndrome Awareness Day
