= Miquelet (militia) =

Type of irregular light infantry

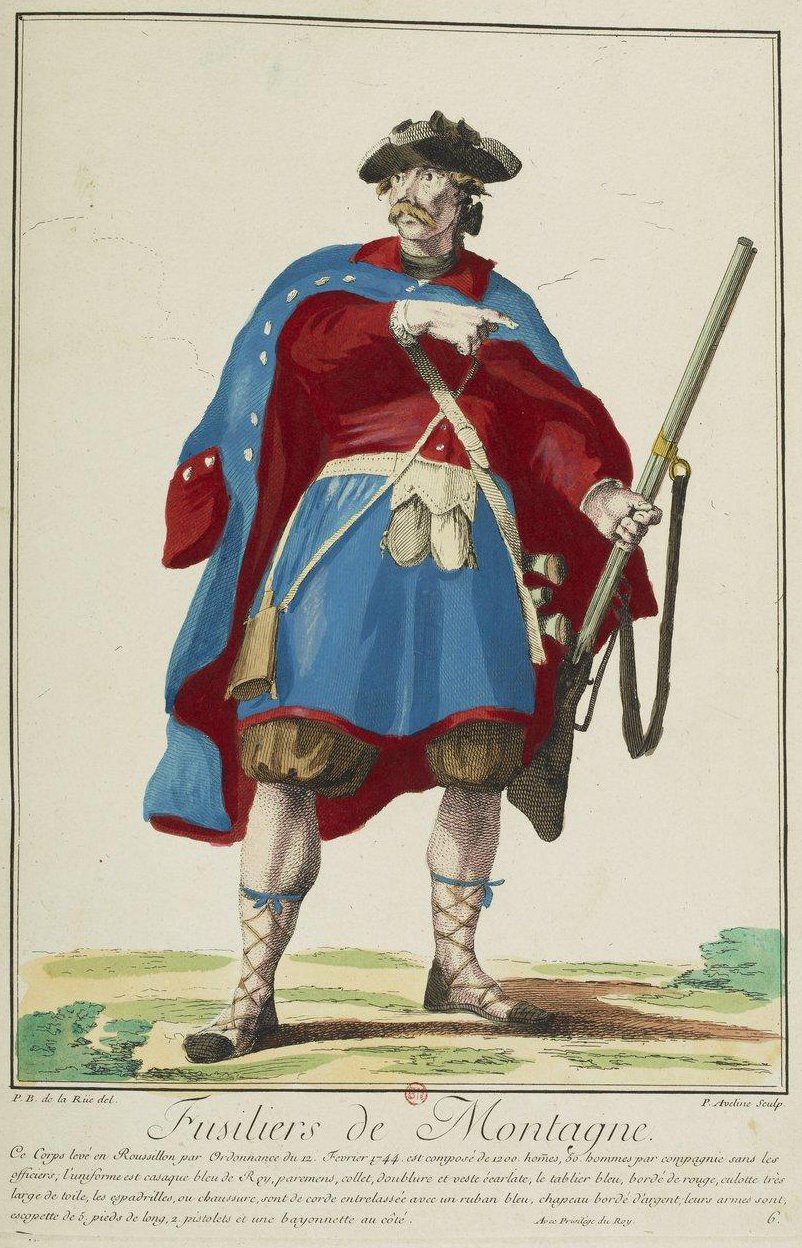
18th-century illustration of a miquelet

Miquelets or Micalets (Catalan pronunciation: [mikəˈlɛts]; Spanish: Migueletes) were a type of irregular light infantry from Catalonia and Valencia which specialised in mountain warfare. They served in several major conflicts fought in Spain during the 17th and 18th centuries, and in times of peace some miquelets turned to brigandage.

== Overview ==
The name is a diminutive of Michael; it is claimed it comes from Miquel or Miquelot de Prats, a Catalan mercenary captain in the service of Cesare Borgia. The term was used for many unconnected groups of Catalans who took up arms in many wars, as well as in banditry. The miquelets were maintained at the parish level, not by the central or the provincial governments, and as they had to turn out for duty on sound of the village alarm-bell (someten) they are frequently called sometents.

== In specific wars ==
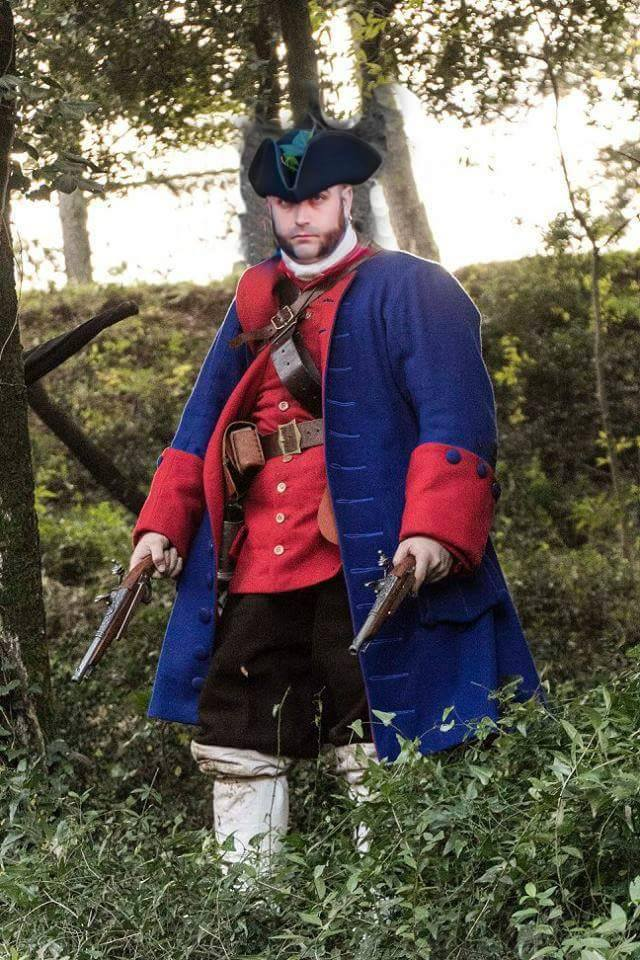
A reenactor dressed as a miquelet of the War of the Spanish Succession

The miquelets were active during the Catalan secessionist revolution of 1640 (Catalan: Guerra dels Segadors, "War of the Reapers"). During the War of the Spanish Succession (1701–1714), most miquelets fought on the Austriacist side; they became part of the Army of Catalonia, in 1713, and continued the struggle against the French claimant Philip, Duke of Anjou (Philip V) until long after the peace.

During the Peninsular War, the miquelets successfully harassed the French occupiers in the mountains of Catalonia, sometimes even participating in operations in large bodies, such as in the Siege of Girona (1809) and other operations around Girona in 1808 and 1809. miquelet was a sobriquet used by Catalan soldiers on both sides of these and other wars; the French raised Catalan troops in 1689 in the Revolt of the Barretines, as well as in 1808 in the Peninsular War.

== Miquelets in the Americas ==
Regiments of miquelets were also integrated in the Spanish Army and fought in other places of the Spanish Empire, outside Spain. Fray Junipero Serra's expedition to establish Catholic missions along the California coast was accompanied by detachments of Migueletes in 1769. The First Free Company of Volunteers of Catalonia, which was composed of Catalan miquelets, was destined in New Spain. From there, the Company played a crucial role in the Spanish colonization of the Pacific Northwest, building Fort San Miguel, the first formal European settlement in modern-day British Columbia, from 1790 to 1792. Its captain, Pere d'Alberní i Teixidor, received military decorations and even was appointed Interim Governor of California in 1800.

== Miquelet police in the Basque region ==
The police forces of the autonomous governments of Biscay (1784–1877) and Gipuzkoa (1796–1936) were known as Miqueletes. Their homologous police forces in Álava and Navarre, called Miñones and Policía foral, managed to survive beyond the Spanish Civil War due to the siding of these provinces with the military uprising.

== See also ==
- Battle of Montjuïc (1641)
- Battle of Cambrils
- Guerrilla warfare in the Peninsular War
- History of Catalonia
- Principality of Catalonia
- Free Company of Volunteers of Catalonia
