= Siege of Salses =

1639–40 battle of the Franco-Spanish War

Coordinates: 42.8336°N 2.9197°E

- Part of the Thirty Years' War and the Franco-Spanish War (1635–59)
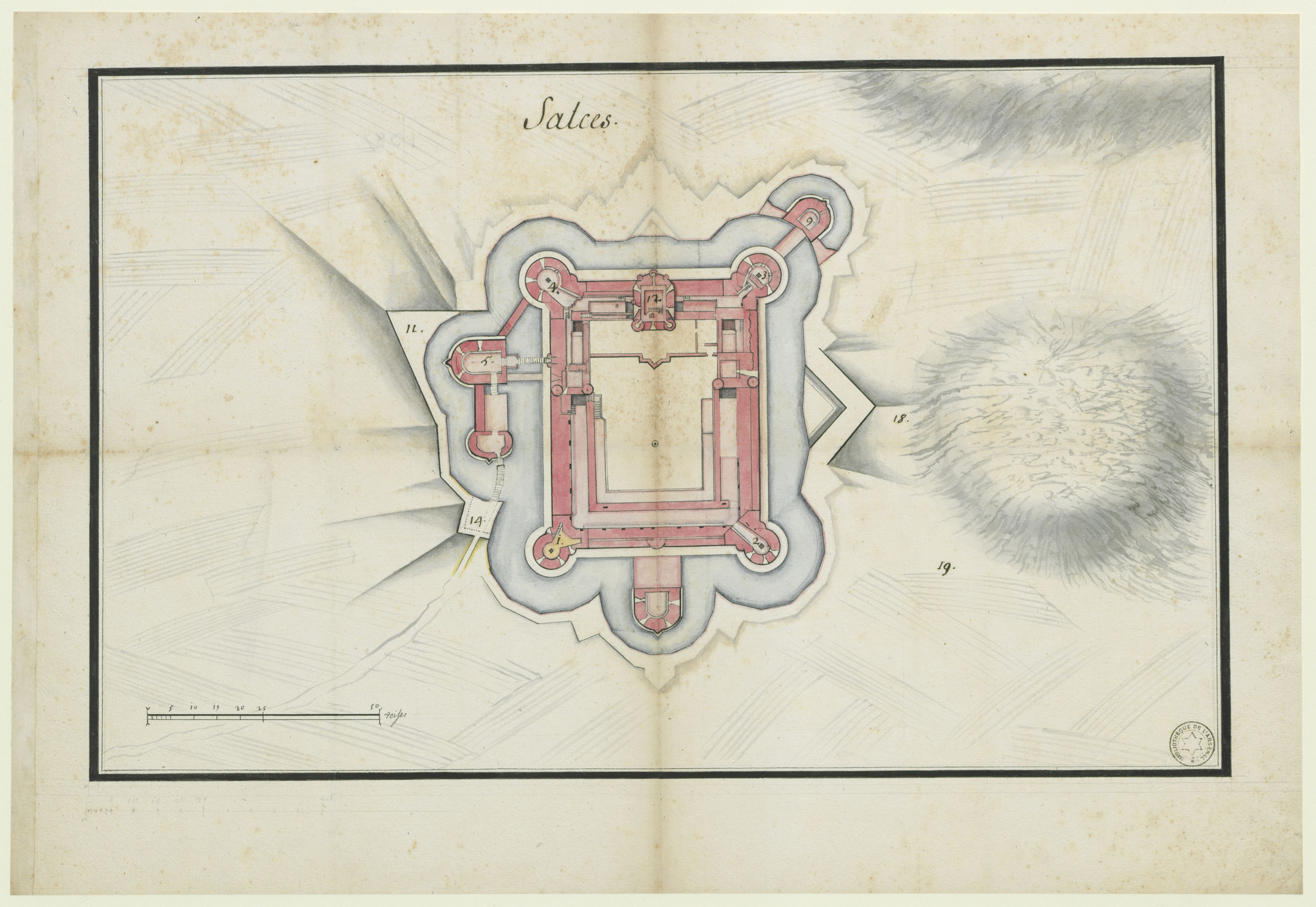
Date	9 June 1639 – 6 January 1640
Location	Salses, Northern Catalonia, Spanish Empire (present-day France)
Result	Spanish victory

Belligerents
France	Spain

Commanders and leaders
(Kingdom of France) Henri de Condé-Bourbon	(Spain) Filippo Spinola (Spanish Empire) Francesc de Tamarit

Strength
16,000 men (first siege); 22,000 men (second siege)	40,000 men (second siege)

Casualties and losses
3,000+ casualties	10,000

The siege of Salses (1639–1640) was a double siege during the Franco-Spanish War (1635–1659), starting with a French success, but ending with a Spanish victory.

== Siege ==
On 9 June 1639, a French army of 16,000 men under Henri, Prince of Condé, besieged the castle of Salses held by 600 Spanish, taking it on 19 June. Six weeks later a large Spanish army of 40,000 men, under Filippo Spinola and Francesc de Tamarit appeared and now besieged the French garrison of 2,000 men.

Condé sent an army of 22,000 men to lift the siege, but suffering from very bad weather, they were defeated in battle by the Spanish on 2 November, with the loss of 3,000 men. Now Salses was alone and hunger forced the French to surrender on 6 January 1640. By then only 800 Frenchmen, of whom 300 were sick, were left. The Spanish army had also lost 10,000 men to disease and desertions.

== Consequences ==
The presence of a large number of troops in Catalonia contributed to the outbreak of the Catalan Revolt a few months later and the murder of Dalmau de Queralt, Count of Santa Coloma, second in command at the siege of Salses. Salses was retaken by the French after the Fall of Perpignan in September 1642.

== Sources ==
- Duffy, Christopher (2013). Siege Warfare: The Fortress in the Early Modern World 1494-1660. Taylor & Francis.
