= Magí Sivillà i Magoles =

Catalan historian

- Born: 26-10-1597; Santa Coloma de Queralt
- Died: 1656-57; Paris
- Occupations: historian, priest

Magí Sivillà Magoles, also written Magí Sevilla (Santa Coloma de Queralt, October 26, 1597- Paris, 1656 or 1657) was a Catalan historian, doctor in theology, and chronicler.

He studied for an ecclesiastical degree, becoming a priest. He was a doctor in theology and a beneficiary of the church of Santa Coloma. During the Reaper's War of 1640, he fought for the Catalan-French side. In 1642 he was sent to Paris as the legal guardian of the children of the governor of Catalonia, Josep de Margarit i de Biure, who as the other leaders of the principality, sent his children to the French capital as a guarantee of the Catalan loyalty to the kings of France. He stayed there until his death. In 1643, he successfully made Louis XIV of France assume the sovereignty of the county of Santa Coloma.

Despite not leaving Paris, Sivillà was elected abbot of Besalú, Banyoles, and Sant Martí del Canigó. Since 1648, he made several arrangements serving the Catalan institutions, acting as an agent of the Generalitat and the Consell de Cent of Barcelona. He wrote a chronicle of major interest in the incidents that happened in Catalonia from 1600 to 1649.

== Structure and content of Magí Sivillà’s chronicle ==
The manuscript is divided into three volumes, formed of 14 books and 1,655 pages, which are divided in the following way:

Manuscript 1 (1598-1640). 496 pages.

Sivillà examines the structural causes that explain the confrontation between the Spanish crown and the Catalan people. He especially emphasizes the failure of the royal visits of Philip IV to Catalonia, and the ambitious politics of count duke Olivares to convert him into the most powerful monarch in the world. Moreover, he emphasizes the feeling of grief that Catalan people felt in front of the tributes and the accommodations that were imposed by the Catholic court. The struggles for power among the Catalan aristocracy and the confrontations between the deputies Claris and Tamarit against the Count of Santa Coloma are also described. Of the almost five hundred pages of this volume, the last three hundred pages are dedicated to the description of the facts that happened in 1640.

Manuscript 2 (1641-1644). 559 pages.

The second volume stars the action of two big military personalities: Josep de Margarit and marshal La Mothe. In its pages, the characteristic style of the chronicle is starting to be seen: the description of the military confrontations is combined with the diplomatic movements. These last movements were in two basic spheres: the confrontation between the two parties in Catalonia (pro-Castilians versus pro-French) and the offer and counter offer game taking place in the Congress of Münster.

Manuscript 3 (1645-1649). 600 pages.

The war progresses. The misery of the two sides is every time more accentuated. Sivillà, who during this period started to act as an agent of the councils of the French court, opens the focus perspective. He analyses the war in the context of the big shock among monarchs that is taking place in Europe. The work gains a geopolitical character. The possibilities of a General Peace, the confrontations in Naples and Sicily, the relationship of the Catholic court with its colonies, the revolts of the Fronde in Paris, the death sentence of king Charles I of England, and so on are analyzed. At no time, however, does Sivillà abandon the central leitmotiv of the work: the description of the Separation War. It is also emphasized the instability of the Catalan commands because of the continued changes in the viceroy and the periods of interregnum. The continued attempts by the Catholic Church to suborn Margarit the governor are also emphasized.

== Impact of the chronicle of Magí Sivillà ==
Sivillà thought that writing the history of his own country was a justification for the rising against Philip IV. Following the style of the publications of his time, these were the memories of the services provided for the loyal Catalans to their sovereign. Therefore, from 1645 onwards, he started the writing of the chronicle called General History of the Principality of Catalonia, counties of Rossellón and Cerdaña. This chronicle can be found in the National French Library of Paris. In the Library of the University of Barcelona, there is a copy of this chronicle made by Pere Serra Postius. Sivillà was inspired by the work of the Portuguese Francisco Manuel de Melo, who wrote History of the Separation Movements of Catalonia (1645). Moreover, he copied some fragments, such as the false discourses of Pau Duran and Pau Claris, pronounced in the General Meeting of Arms in 1640 and that Josep Sanabre Sanromà, in the work Dialogues of Pau Claris and Pau Duran (1968), gave as authentic work, because he found them in the Parisian manuscripts of Magí Sivillà.

Sivillà gathered a lot of first-hand information and documents of major significance thanks to his contacts in Paris. The chronicle, written in Spanish, has many Catalanisms and Gallicisms. Sivillà died in 1657 leaving the chronicle unfinished. His long text was published in December 2019 by the Centre of Contemporary History of Catalonia. Previously, Celestino Pujol Camps, published some small fragments in the appendices of the Spanish version of the chronicle of Parets, edited in the Spanish Historical Memorial (1888–93).
