= Francesco Maria Carafa =

Italian nobleman and military commander

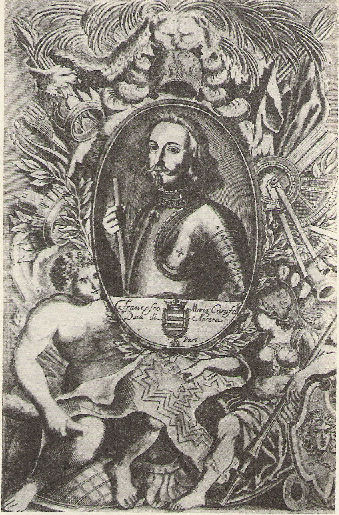
Francesco Maria Carafa.

Francesco Maria Carafa (died 1642) was an Italian nobleman, 5th Duke of Nochera, a Knight of the Order of the Golden Fleece and was viceroy of Aragon and Navarre and a military commander who commanded troops loyal to King Philip IV of Spain.

== Biography ==
Carafa married Anna Pignatelli, Marquess of Belmonte and later Giovanna Ruffo. In 1610, he rearranged his land holdings, selling the comune of Tiriolo to the Duke of Messina.

In 1625 he took part in the Siege of Breda and then transferred into the ranks of the Neapolitan cavalry in Lombardy, where five years later he was appointed Master of the Field in the region near Piedmont and Monferrato.

In 1633 his commanded troops during the Battle of Nördlingen against the Swedish Empire and secured a decisive victory for Spain. He then went to Flanders in support of Cardinal-Infante Ferdinand of Austria until he was recalled by Philip IV and appointed Commander General in Guipúzcoa to take part in the (failed) plan to invade France.

In 1639, Carafa was named viceroy and Captain General of Aragon and was named a Knight of the Order of the Golden Fleece. The following year he was named viceroy and Captain General of adjoining Navarre.

During 1641, Carafa questioned the domestic policies of Gaspar de Guzmán, Count-Duke of Olivares, especially in relation to the Catalan Revolt, and was imprisoned. He died in prison the following year. He was eventually exonerated by a posthumous trial.

== Legacy ==
Each year in May, the citizens of Nocera gather in costume to watch actors playing Carafa and his bride come together in ceremonial marriage.
