= Union of Arms =

The Union of Arms (in Spanish Unión de Armas) was a political proposal, put forward by Gaspar de Guzmán, Count-Duke of Olivares for greater military co-operation between the constituent parts of the composite monarchy ruled by Philip IV of Spain.

The plan was for each of the kingdoms ruled by Philip to contribute equitably to a fund from which 140,000 troops would be maintained for the defense of the monarchy. The plan was "a thinly disguised attempt to integrate the fiscal institutions of the empire [that] prompted much opposition in the Indies."

Union of Arms.

The division of contributions envisaged was:

- Crown of Castile, 44,000 troops
- Spanish Netherlands, 12,000 troops
- Kingdom of Aragon, 10,000 troops
- Kingdom of Valencia, 6,000 troops
- Principality of Catalonia, 16,000 troops
- Kingdom of Portugal, 16,000 troops
- Kingdom of Naples, 16,000 troops
- Kingdom of Sicily, 6,000 troops
- Duchy of Milan, 8,000 troops
- Mediterranean and Atlantic islands, 6,000 troops

Although the proposal ultimately failed, it was an important factor in the growing mistrust of Castilian hegemony that led to the Reapers' War in Catalonia and the Portuguese Restoration War.

== See also ==
- Spanish Empire
