= Croat (coin) =

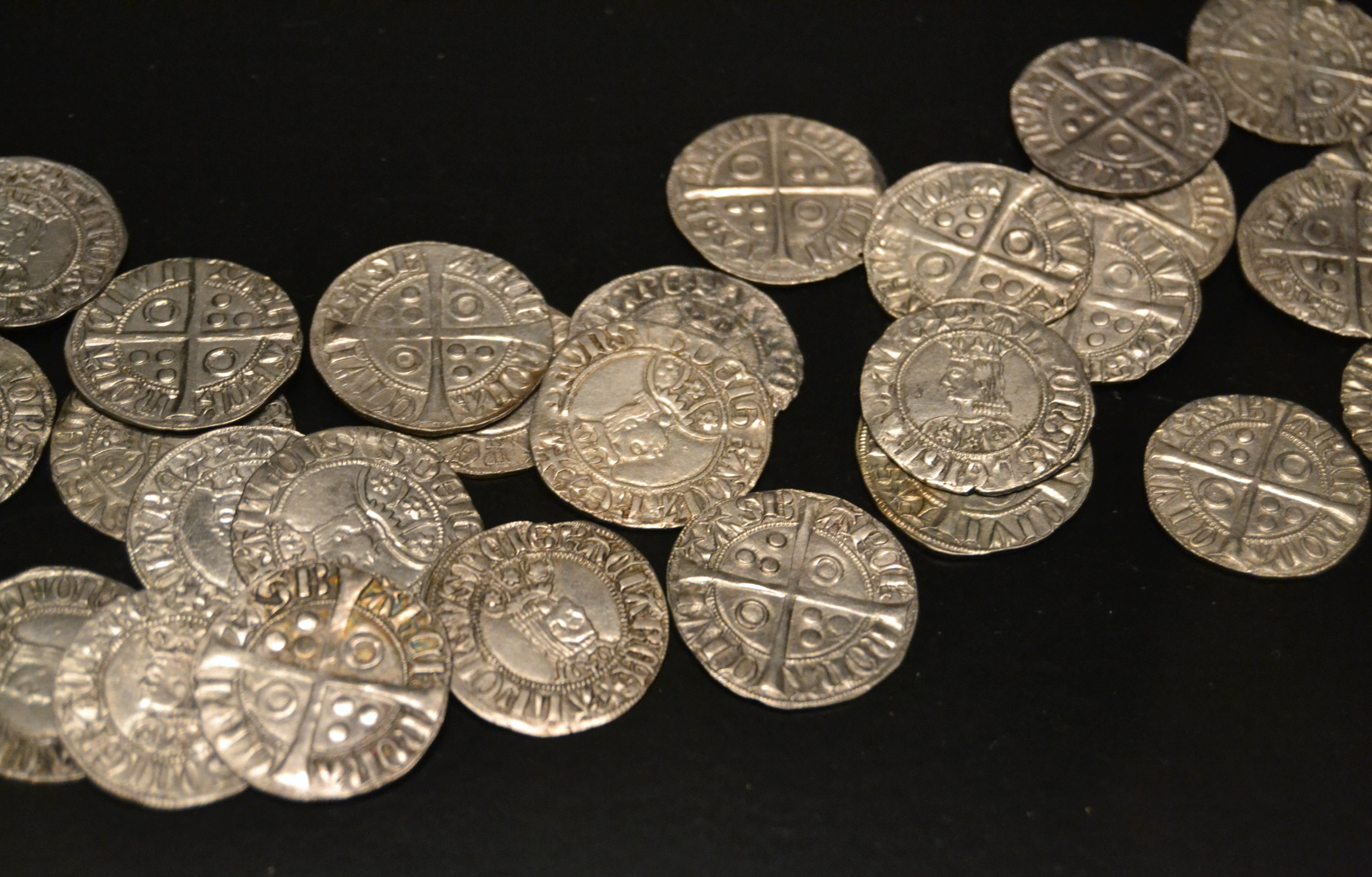
A selection of croats from the Museu de Prehistòria de València

The croat was a silver coin of Catalonia introduced by the king Peter III in 1285 and minted at Barcelona, Perpignan and Tortosa. The term "croat" derives from the Latin grossus denarius, great coin, a common term for silver coins of higher value than pennies. Peter III was inspired by the gros introduced by Louis IX of France.

The croat was originally worth twelve terns of 25% silver billon. In 1340 the gold florín was introduced at a value of eleven croats. The purity of the florín was fixed at eighteen carats (75% gold) in 1365. As the popularity of the florín and the croat grew, the Aragonese empire settled into bimetallism. The Catalan croat was equivalent in value to the Aragonese ral (which went by many names: grosso, real, alfonsino, anfusinus). It was the most stable of all the Aragonese coinage and widely used in the Mediterranean trade.

== Sources ==
- Crusafont i Sabater, Miguel; Balaguer, Anna M. (2003). "Coinage and Currency, Catalonia". In Gerli, E. Michael (ed.). Medieval Iberia: An Encyclopedia. New York: Routledge. pp. 241–42.
- Spufford, Peter (1988). Money and its Use in Medieval Europe. Cambridge: Cambridge University Press.
- Vicens Vives, Jaime (1972). "The Economies of Catalonia and Castile". In Highfield, J. R. L.; López Morillas, Frances M. (eds.). Spain in the Fifteenth Century, 1369–1516: Essays and Extracts by Historians of Spain. London: Macmillan.
