= Battle of Cambrils =

1640 battle of the Reapers' War

Coordinates: 41.0753°N 1.0544°E

- Part of the Reapers' War
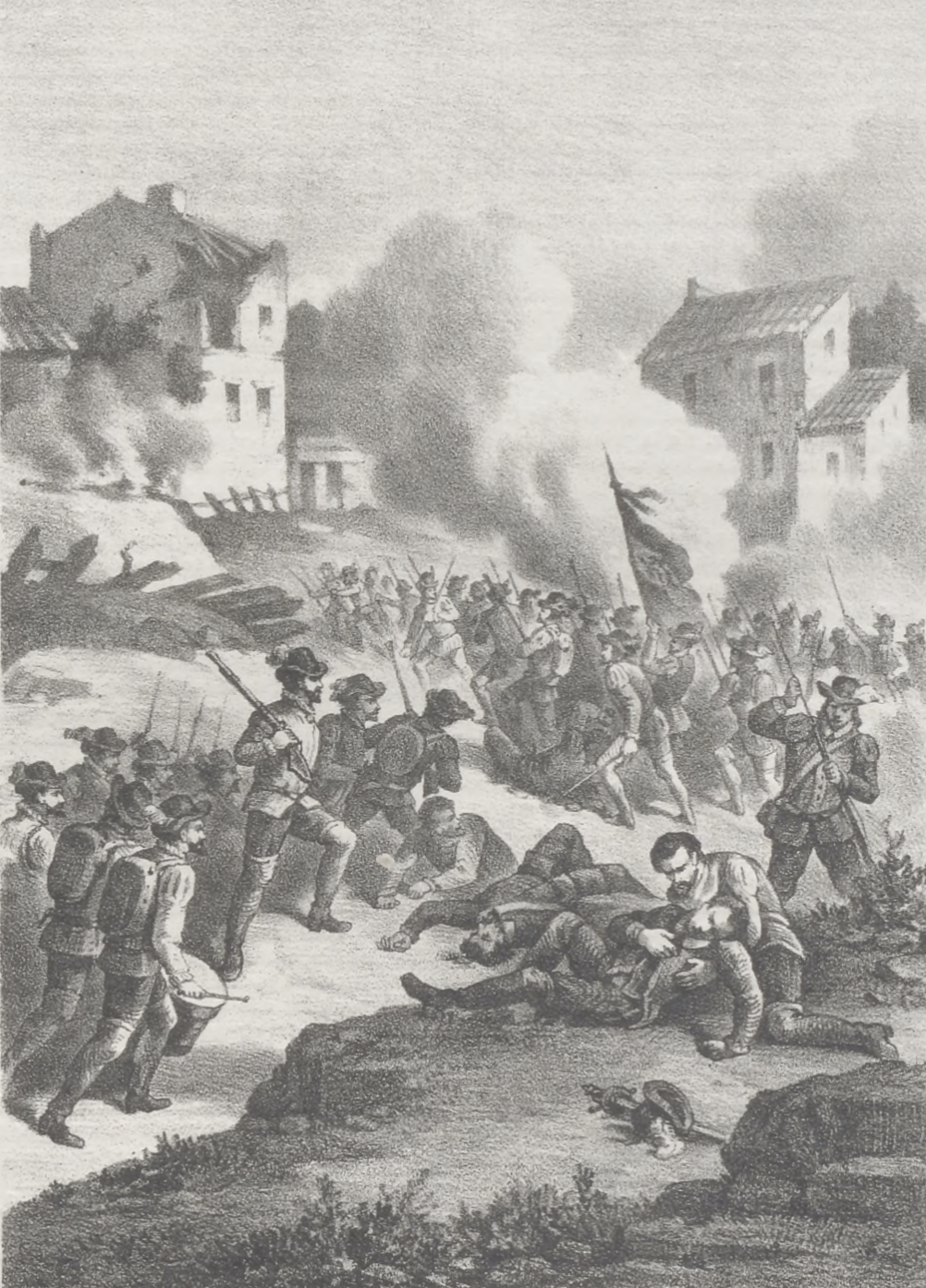
- Combat of Cambrils
Date	13–16 December 1640
Location	Cambrils, Principality of Catalonia, Spain
Result	Spanish victory

Belligerents
Principality of Catalonia	Spain

Commanders and leaders
Antoni d'Armengol (executed); Jacint Vilosa (executed); Carles Bertrolà i de Caldés (executed)	(Spain) Pedro Fajardo

Strength
2,000–4,000; 2 cannons	23,000 infantry 3,000 cavalry 25 cannons

Casualties and losses
1,100 killed	Unknown

The Battle of Cambrils or the Massacre of Cambrils took place in December 1640 during the Reapers' War.

The revolt had started in May–June 1640 and as a reaction the Spanish Army had occupied Tortosa in Catalonia in September. On 8 December a large army under Pedro Fajardo de Zúñiga y Requesens headed for Barcelona, passing through Cambrils.

Here, a small force of Catalan rebels attempted to ambush this much larger force, before withdrawing into the town and attempting to defend it. After several days of bombardment and heavy fighting the Spanish captured the town.
When the defenders tried to surrender, some 700 of them were massacred. The three leaders were quickly tried and executed on the garrote. The next day, more people were hanged and the city was sacked.
The Spanish army then continued in the direction of Barcelona, taking Tarragona on 24 December. Later this army was decisively defeated in the Battle of Montjuïc on 23 January.
