= Joan Pere Fontanella =

Catalan judge and advocate (1576–1649)

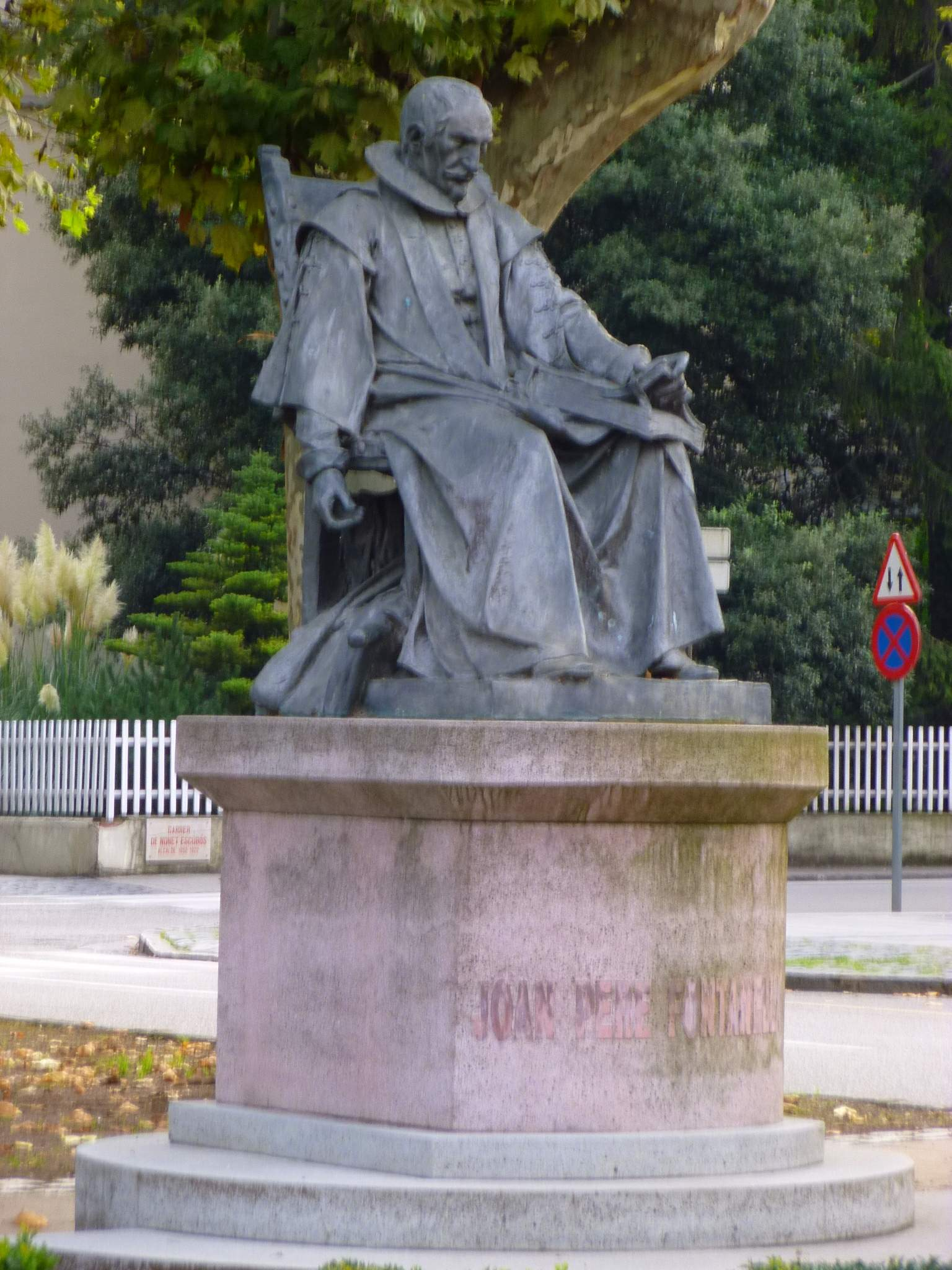
A statue

Joan Pere Fontanella (Olot, 1576–Perpignan, 1649) was a Catalan judge and advocate.

== Biography ==
As a co-instigator of the Reapers' War of 1640 while Conseller en Cap ("Head Counsellor") of Barcelona, he had to flee to France, settling in Perpignan in 1649, where he was elected to the city government.

He gained his scholarly reputation by publishing a report of decisions of the Royal Audience of Catalonia, the Catalan supreme court (Decisiones Sacri Regii Senatus Cathaloniae, 1639) and a two-volume manual on prenuptial agreements (Tractatus de pactis nuptialibus, 1612–22). Both are still cited today by courts in Catalonia.

== Sources ==
- Reichardt, Nikola (2001). "Fontanella, Juan Pedro". In Michael Stolleis (ed.). Juristen: ein biographisches Lexikon; von der Antike bis zum 20. Jahrhundert (in German) (2nd ed.). München: Beck. p. 215. ISBN 3-406-45957-9.
