= Reapers' War =

1640–1659 rebellion to restore an independent Catalonia

- Part of the Franco-Spanish War and the Thirty Years' War
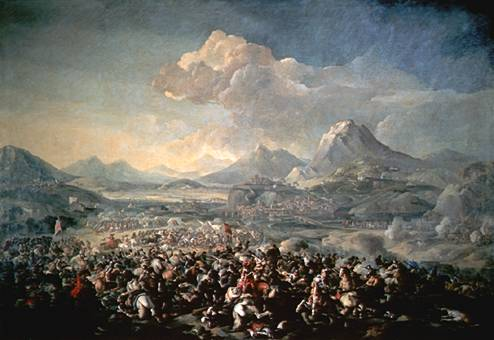
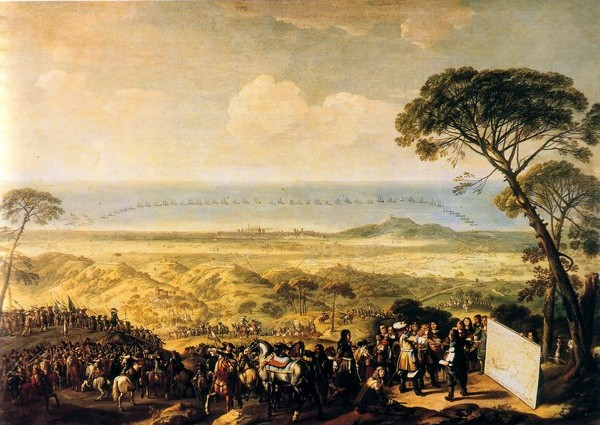
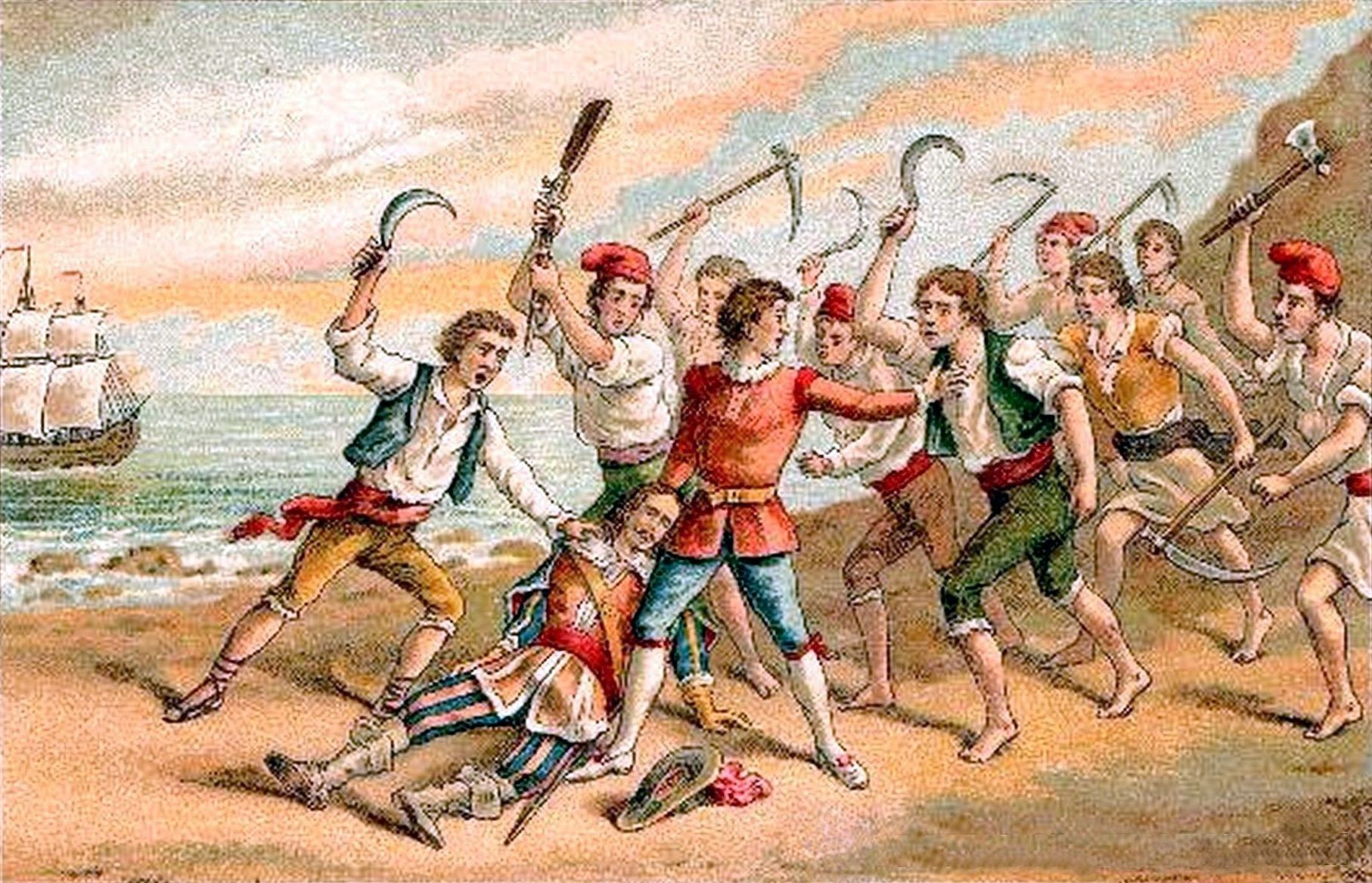
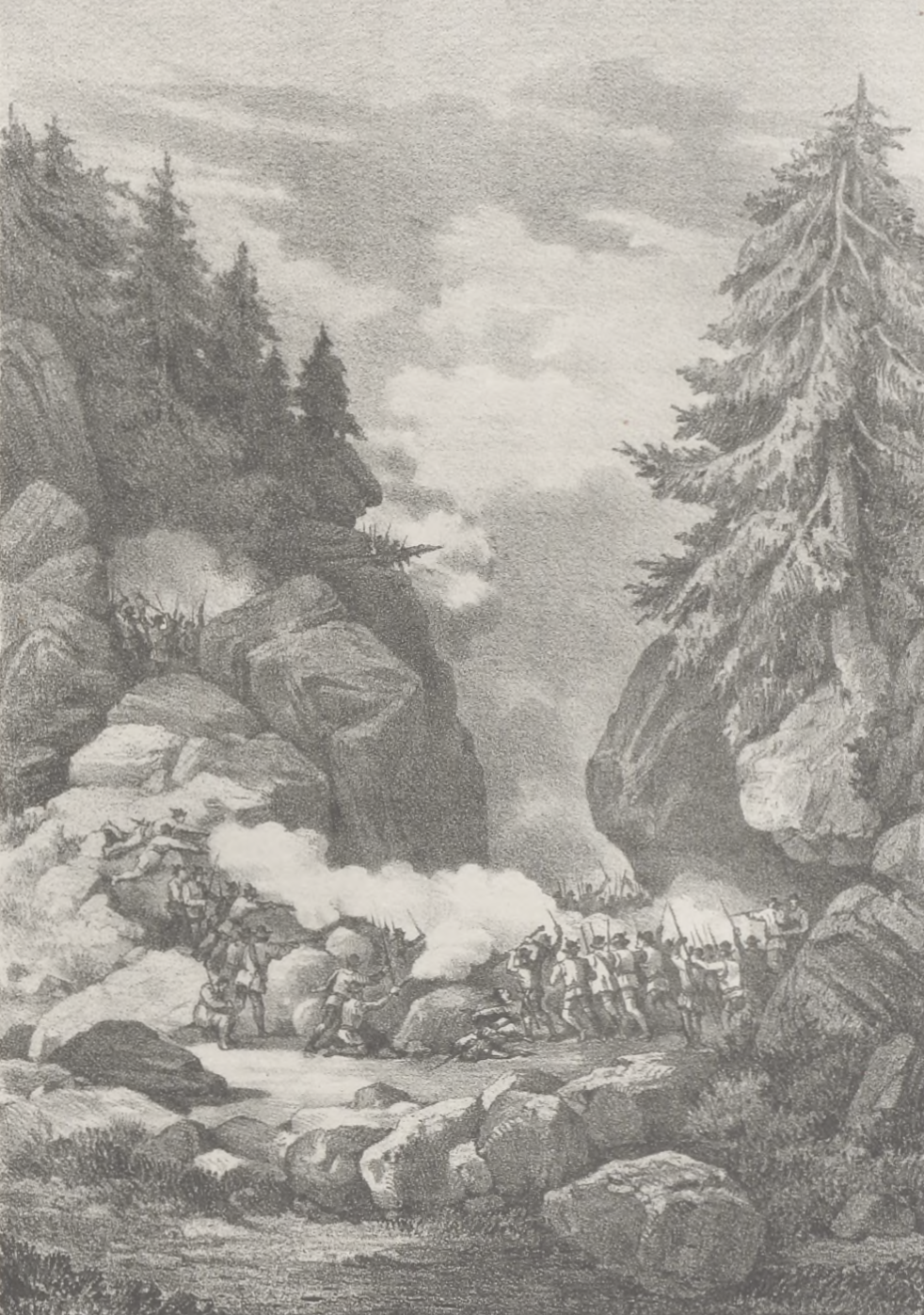
- From top to bottom, left to right: Battle of Montjuïc by Pandolfo Reschi; Siege of Barcelona by Pandolfo Reschi; Corpus de Sang; Battle of Argeles
Date	1640–1659
Location	Catalonia, eastern Spain, Southern France
Result	Revolt suppressed by Spain
Territorial changes	Treaty of the Pyrenees: County of Roussillon and the northern half of Cerdanya ceded to France

Belligerents
Principality of Catalonia (Catalan Republic between 1640–1641); France	Spain

Commanders and leaders
Pau Claris; Francesc de Tamarit; Josep Margarit; Louis XIII; Louis XIV; George Stewart; Henri de Sourdis; Philippe de La Mothe-Houdancourt; Jean Armand de Maillé-Brézé †	Philip IV; Count-Duke of Olivares; Pedro Fajardo; Duke of Fernandina; Duke of Maqueda; Duke of Ciudad Real; Marquis of Leganés; Andrea Cantelmo; Felipe da Silva; Dalmau de Queralt X

The Reapers' War (Catalan: Guerra dels Segadors, Eastern Catalan: [ˈɡɛrə ðəls səɣəˈðos]; Spanish: Guerra de los Segadores, French: Guerre des faucheurs), also known as the Catalan Revolt or Catalan Revolution, was a conflict that affected the Principality of Catalonia between 1640 and 1659, in the context of the Franco-Spanish War of 1635–1659. Incited by an unrest among the Catalan peasantry and institutions, as well as French diplomatic movements, the war resulted in the establishment of the short-lived Catalan Republic and the subsequent clash of Spanish and French armies on Catalan soil for over a decade.

It had an enduring effect in the Treaty of the Pyrenees (1659), which ceded the County of Roussillon and the northern half of the County of Cerdanya to France (see French Cerdagne), splitting these northern Catalan territories off from the Principality of Catalonia, and thereby receding the borders of Spain to the Pyrenees.

== Background ==
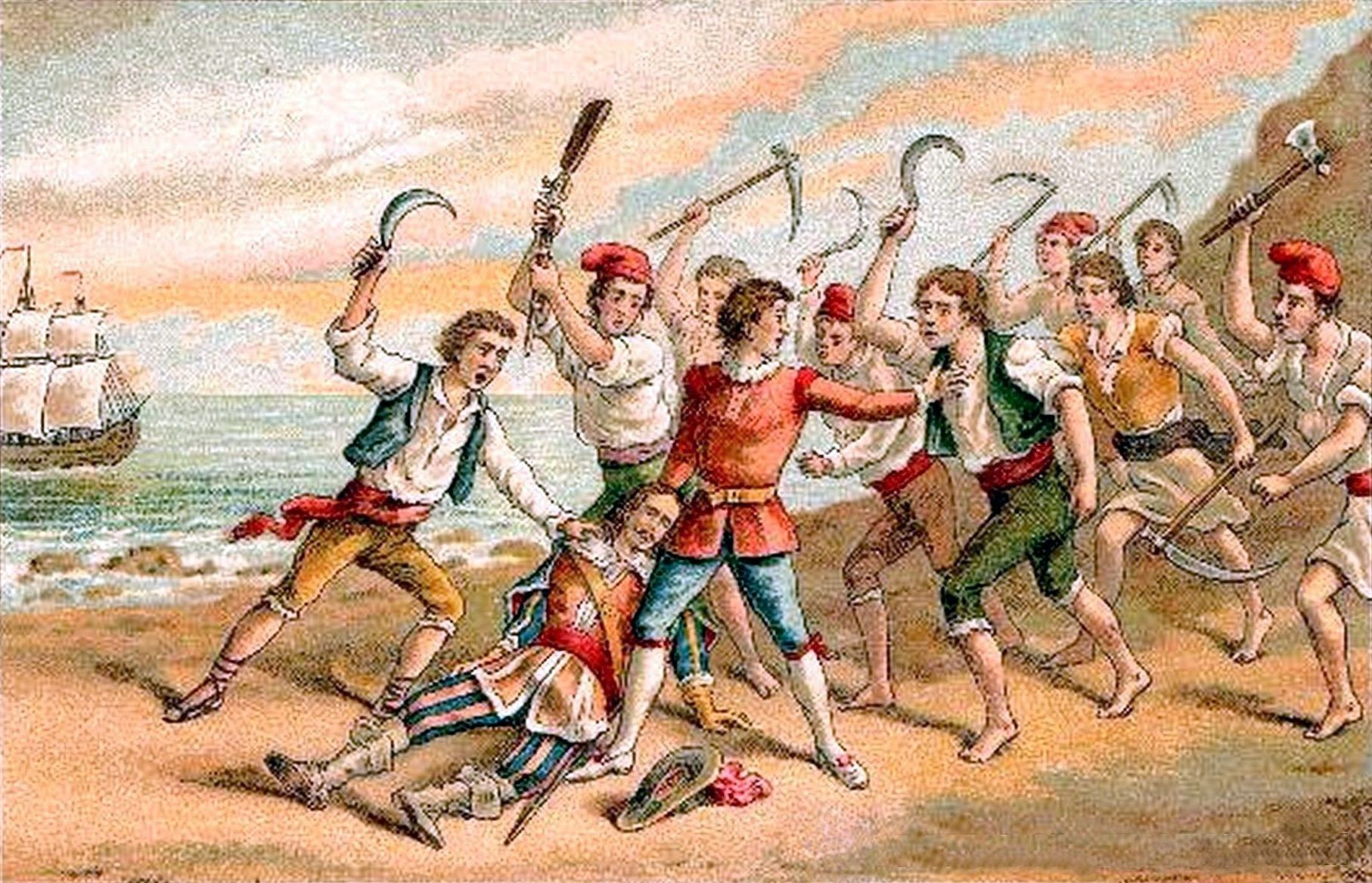
Corpus de Sang (7 June 1640)

The war had its roots in the discomfort generated in Catalan society by the presence of the royal army (made mostly of mercenaries from different nationalities) during the Franco-Spanish War between the Kingdom of France and the Monarchy of Spain as part of the Thirty Years' War, as well the opposition of Catalan institutions to the centralised policies of the Royal Court.

Gaspar de Guzmán, Count-Duke of Olivares, the chief minister of Philip IV, had been trying to distribute more evenly the huge economic and military burden of the Spanish Empire. But his Union of Arms (Spanish: Unión de Armas) policy raised hostilities and protests across the states of the Monarchy of Spain. Resistance in Catalonia was especially strong; the Catalan Courts of 1626 and 1632 were never concluded, due to the opposition of the states against the economic and military measures of Olivares, many of which violated the Constitutions of Catalonia.

In 1638, the canon of La Seu d'Urgell Pau Claris, known for his opposition to non-Catalan bishops who collaborated with the Crown, was elected by the ecclesiastic estate as president of the Generalitat, with Francesc de Tamarit elected member of the Generalitat by the military estate and Josep-Miquel Quintana Torroella by the popular estate. Around 1639, both causes approached and the identification and solidarity of the peasants took place with the attitude of political distrust of the authorities. Thus the political doctrine of the uprising and the popular ideology of the revolt were formed.

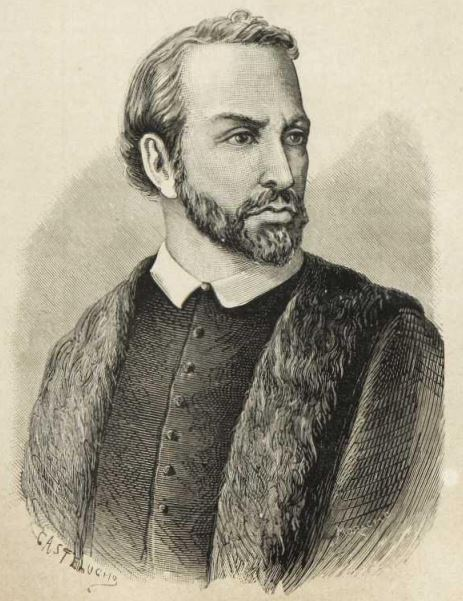
Pau Claris i Casademunt, President of the Generalitat during the early stages of the War

Catalan peasants, who were forced to quarter the royal army and reported events such as religious sacrileges, destruction of personal properties and rape of women by the soldiers, responded in a series of local rebellions against their presence.

The revolt grew, until the Corpus Christi day of May 1640 in Barcelona, with an uprising known as 'Bloody Corpus' (Catalan: Corpus de Sang), under the slogans "Long live the faith of Christ!", "The King our Lord has declared war on us!" "Long live the land, death to bad government", "Reap our chains". When the bishop of Barcelona, after blessing the furious crowd, asked them: "Who is your captain? What is your flag?" They raised a big Christ on the Cross statue covered with an all black cloth and shouted "Here is our captain, this is our flag!". This 'Bloody Corpus' which began with the death of a reaper (Catalan: segador), and led to the assassination by Catalan rebels of the Spanish Viceroy of Catalonia, the second Count of Santa Coloma, marked the beginning of the conflict. The irregular militia involved were known as "Miquelets". The situation took Olivares by surprise, with most of the Spanish army fighting on other fronts far from Catalonia. The Council of Aragon demanded more military presence in Barcelona as the only way to restore the order.

== Conflict ==
Pau Claris, President of the Generalitat of Catalonia, summoned on 10 September the Junta de Braços or Braços Generals (assembly of Estates or States-General) of Catalonia, an extraordinary body made up of the representatives of the three Estates of the realm in the Catalan Courts (the parliament), presided by the Generalitat. The summit of the Junta de Braços was a success and an important improvement of representation by standards of the time, as it was also attended by representatives of cities which usually weren't invited to the Courts, as well as members of various feudal towns and, in addition, it mostly worked under the basis of individual vote instead of the traditional single vote per Estate. The new assembly began to assume the sovereignty, enacting a series of revolutionary measures, such as the establishment of a Council of Justice in replacement of the Royal Audience of Catalonia (the royal judges were also assassinated during the Corpus de Sang), the Council of Defense of the Principality in order to raise an army to respond the expected Royal counter-attack, as well as the Council of Treasury which began to issue debt and a special tax to the nobility (the Batalló), while the tension with the monarchy grew.

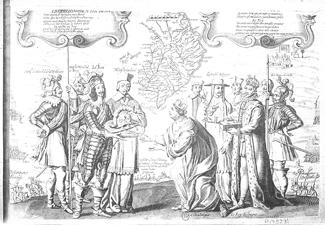
Allegory of Catalonia asking to France for protection

At the same time, the Generalitat maintained diplomatic contacts with the Kingdom of France, in order to establish an alliance between the Principality of Catalonia and this country. Bernard du Plessis-Besançon was appointed plenipotentiary of the King of France to Catalonia on 29 August 1640. By the pact of Ceret (September 1640), the French monarchy promised to help the Principality. The massacre perpetrated by the Spanish armies in Cambrils on 16 December, a method similar to those carried out in the fight against the Dutch Republic, convinced Catalan leadership that they could not expect any pardon or negotiated solution with the Spanish king.

As a result of the negotiation, on 16 January, Pau Claris presented a proposal before the Junta de Braços by which the King of France agreed to put the Principality under his protection if Catalonia changed its government to a republic. On 17 January 1641, the Junta de Braços accepted the establishment of the Catalan Republic under French protection. However, a week later, following the defeat of the Catalan army in the Battle of Martorell, close to Barcelona, du Plessis-Besançon managed to convince the Catalan authorities that the help they needed could only be obtained from France if they recognized Louis XIII of France as sovereign. Pau Claris appealed on 23 January to Louis XIII, recognizing him as Count of Barcelona (as Louis I) and thus beginning the process to place the Principality of Catalonia in a personal union with the Kingdom of France.

The threat of the French enemy establishing a powerful base south of the Pyrenees caused an immediate reaction from the Habsburg monarchy. The Habsburg government sent a large army of 26,000 men under Pedro Fajardo to crush the Catalan Revolt. On its way to Barcelona, the Spanish army retook several cities, executing hundreds of prisoners, and a rebel army of the Catalan Republic was defeated in Martorell, near Barcelona, on 23 January. In response the Catalans reinforced their efforts and the Franco-Catalan armies obtained an important military victory over the Spanish army in the Battle of Montjuïc (26 January 1641). Pau Claris died a month later, probably poisoned by Spanish agents. His successor, Josep Soler, prepared the formal agreement of personal union between Catalonia and France, which was ratified by the Treaty of Peronne on 19 September 1641.

After the military success, the Junta de Braços was able to establish its own Judiciary throughout Catalan territory with the help of French armies, despite the persistence of some class war in the form of local uprisings of peasants. For the next decade the Catalans fought in French personal union, taking the initiative after Montjuïc. Meanwhile, increasing French control of political and administrative affairs despite the agreements reached in Peronne (maritime ports, taxes, key bureaucratic positions, etc.) and a firm military focus on the neighbouring Spanish kingdoms of Valencia and Aragon, in line with Cardinal Richelieu's war against Spain, gradually undermined Catalan enthusiasm for the French.

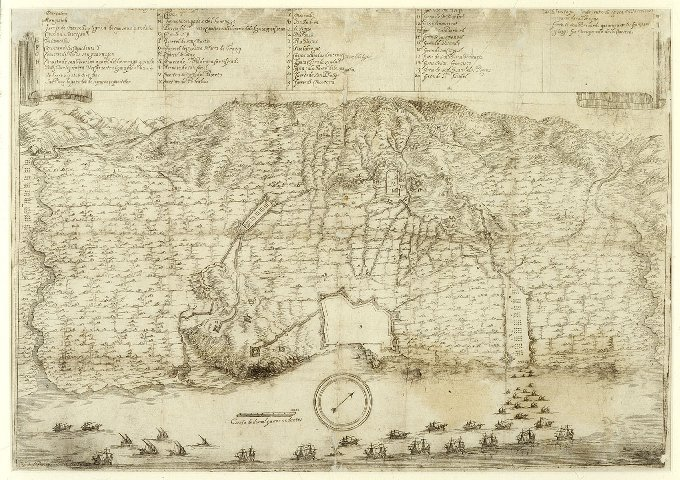
Siege of Barcelona, 1652

A Franco-Catalan army under Philippe de La Mothe-Houdancourt moved south and gained several victories against the Spanish, but the sieges of Tarragona (1644), Lleida and Tortosa finally failed and the allies had to withdraw.

In the north of Catalonia in Roussillon, they were more successful. Perpignan was taken from the Spanish after a siege of 10 months, and the whole of Roussillon was under French control. Shortly after, Spanish relief armies were defeated at the Battle of Montmeló and Battle of Barcelona.

Due to the ravages caused by the famine and the plague, the commitment made by Philip IV to respect the Catalan constitutions and institutions in 1644, and the outbreak of the Fronde conflict in France, the Spanish offensive was able to capture Barcelona in 1652 after a year of siege, bringing the Catalan capital under Spanish control again. Then, the French armies and officers, as well as Catalans loyal to them, retreated to the northern side of the Pyrenees, retaining control of the Roussillon while maintaining the claim over the entirety of Catalonia. Resistance continued for several years afterwards and some fighting took place north of the Pyrenees but the mountains would remain from then on the effective border between Spanish and French territories.

== Resolution ==
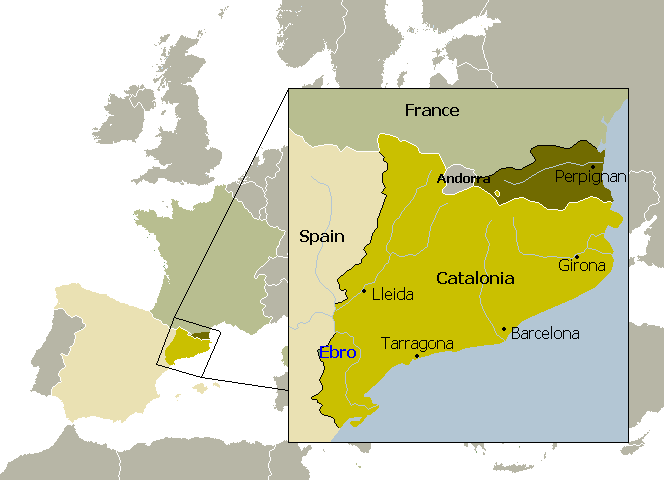
Partition of the Principality of Catalonia, 1659

The conflict extended beyond the Peace of Westphalia, which concluded the Thirty Years' War in 1648 but remained part of the Franco-Spanish War (1635–1659) with the confrontation between two sovereigns and two Generalitats, one based in Barcelona, under the control of Spain and the other in Perpinyà (Perpignan), under the occupation of France. In 1652 the French authorities renounced Catalonia, but held control of Roussillon, ultimately leading to the signing of the Treaty of the Pyrenees in 1659.

Spanish troops being busy in Catalonia considerably helped Portugal, on the other side of the Iberian Peninsula, in successfully shaking off Spanish rule and winning its Restoration War at the same time. The Catalan war was also concurrent with the Arauco War in Chile where the Spanish fought a coalition of native Mapuches. With the Arauco War being a lengthy and costly conflict, the Spanish crown ordered its authorities in Chile to sign a peace agreement with the Mapuche in order to concentrate the empire's resources in fighting the Catalans. This way the Mapuche obtained a peace treaty and a recognition on behalf of the crown in a case unique for any indigenous group in the Americas.

== See also ==
- "Els Segadors" ("The Reapers"), the official national anthem of Catalonia. The current lyrics are from 1899, originally based in this revolt.
- The Fronde, French uprising between 1648 and 1653 that was supported by Spain
- Revolt of the Barretines, another Catalan revolt from 1687–1689.
- War of the Catalans
- Slovak Volunteer Campaigns, a similar revolt in Slovakia from 1848 to 1849.
- Joan Pere Fontanella, Catalan judge and advocate
- François de Calvo

== Sources ==
- J. Sanabre. La acción de Francia en Cataluña en la pugna por la hegemonía de Europa (1640–1659). Barcelona, 1956. Still indispensable for its detailed coverage of the events from 1640/41 and later.
- J.H. Elliott. The Revolt of the Catalans: a Study in the Decline of Spain (1598–1640). Cambridge, 1963.
- Serra, Eva (1991). 1640: una revolució política. La implicació de les institucions. Barcelona: Crítica.
- Simon, Antoni (2019). 1640. Barcelona: Rafael Dalmau, Editor. ISBN 978-84-232-0851-7.
