= Battle of Montjuïc (1641) =

1641 battle of the Reapers' War

Coordinates: 41°22′02″N 2°09′32″E

- Part of the Reapers' War
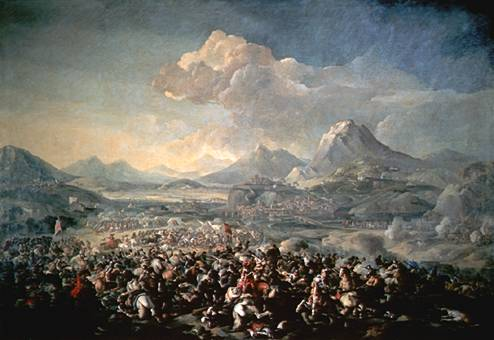
- Battle of Montjuïc
Date	26 January 1641
Location	Montjuïc, Principality of Catalonia
Result	Franco-Catalan victory

Belligerents
Catalan Republic; Kingdom of France	(Spain) Spanish Empire

Commanders and leaders
Francesc de Tamarit (Kingdom of France) Henri de Serignan (Kingdom of France) George Stewart	(Spain) Pedro Fajardo (Spain) John O'Neill †

Strength
6,000	23,000

Casualties and losses
50	300–1,500

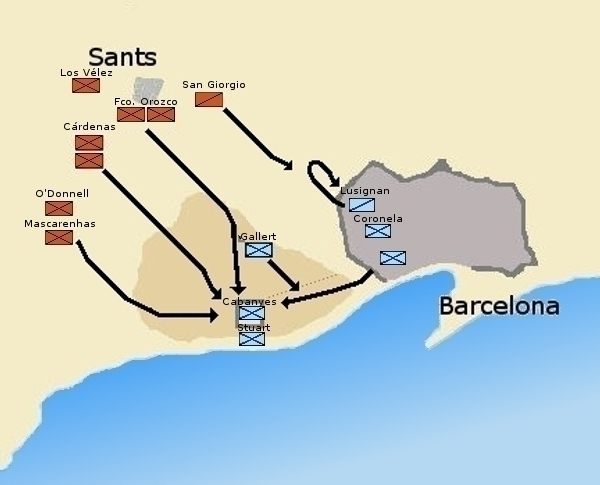
Spanish troops in red, Catalans in blue

The Battle of Montjuïc took place on 26 January 1641 during the Reapers' War. A Spanish force under Pedro Fajardo launched an attack on the Catalan army led by Francesc de Tamarit, with French cavalry support. The Spanish force had recently massacred hundreds of rebels who had tried to surrender at Cambrils.

The Catalan rebels had taken up position on the heights of Montjuïc which dominated the city of Barcelona. The Spanish launched several concerted attempts to capture Montjuïc Castle, but were continually repulsed. Finally a large force of Catalan rebels counter-attacked from the direction of Barcelona. Large numbers of Spanish troops were killed and the remainder had to withdraw to Tarragona along the coast.

Amongst those killed at the battle was John O'Neill, the exiled Earl of Tyrone, who was serving with an Irish regiment in the Spanish army.

== Bibliography ==
- Elliott, John (1963). The revolt of the Catalans: a study in the decline of Spain (1598–1640). Cambridge: Cambridge University Press. ISBN 0-521-27890-2.
- Serra, Eva. La guerra dels segadors. Ed. Bruguera (Barcelona, 1966)
