= Corpus de Sang =

1640 riot in Catalonia triggering the Reapers' War

Coordinates: 41.4019°N 2.1667°E

- Part of Thirty Years' War
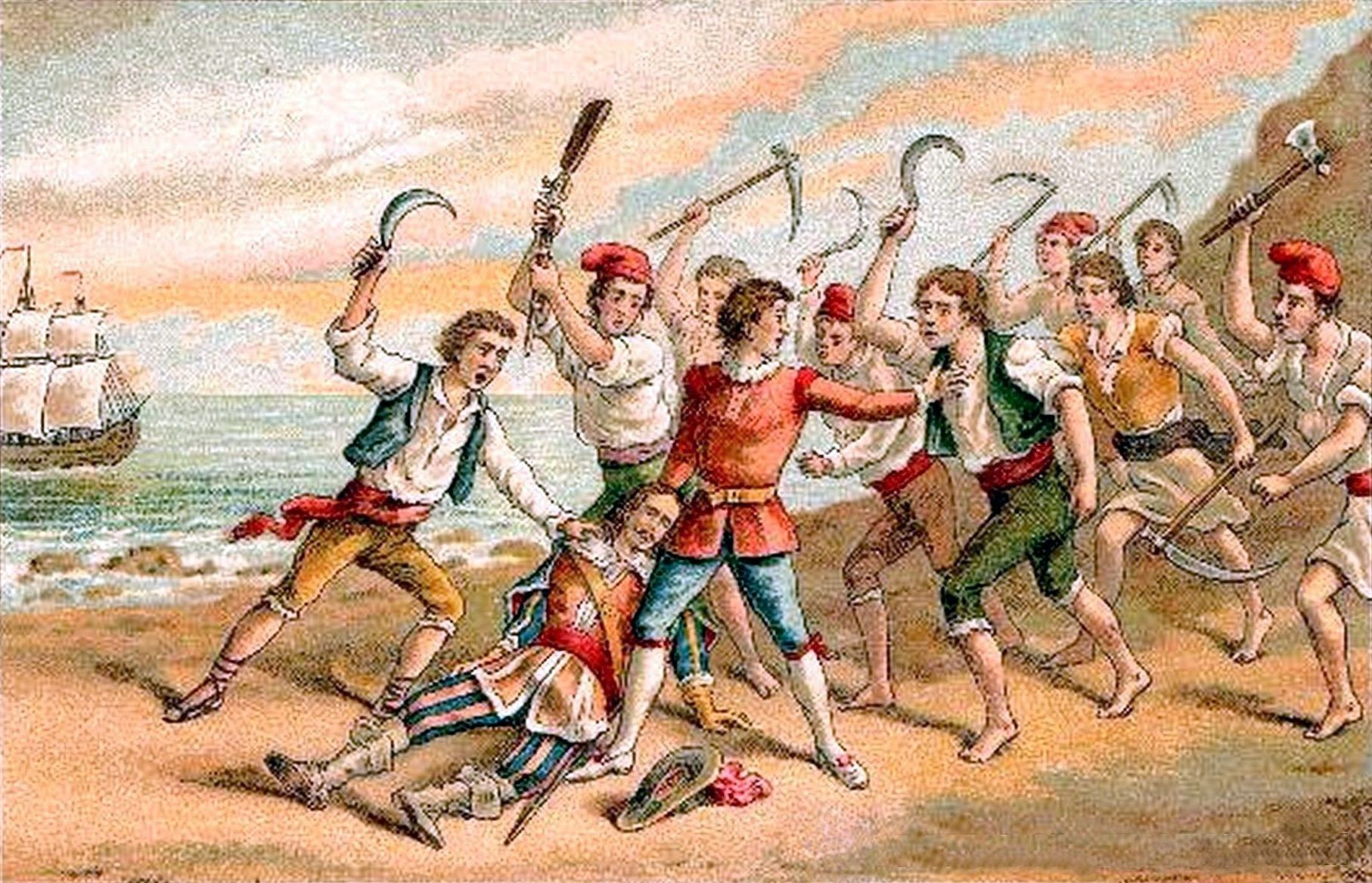
- "Corpus of Blood" by H. Miralles (1910)
Date	7 June, 1640
Location	Sant Andreu de Palomar and Barcelona (Principality of Catalonia, Spain)
Result	Catalan victory Escalation of hostilities between Catalonia and the Monarchy, leading to the Reapers' War

Belligerents
Catalan harvesters	(Spain) Spanish Monarchy

Commanders and leaders
	(Spain) Dalmau de Queralt †

Casualties and losses
	Between 12 & 20 dead

The Corpus de Sang (Catalan pronunciation: [ˈkɔɾpuz ðə ˈsaŋ], "Corpus of Blood") was a riot which took place in Sant Andreu de Palomar and later in Barcelona on 7–10 June 1640, during Corpus Christi, which marked a turning point in the development of the Reapers' War.

The riot was between a group of harvesters and some local "andreuencs", during which one harvester was badly hurt.
