= Pedro III Fajardo, 5th Marquis of Los Vélez =

Spanish soldier and noble (1602–1647)

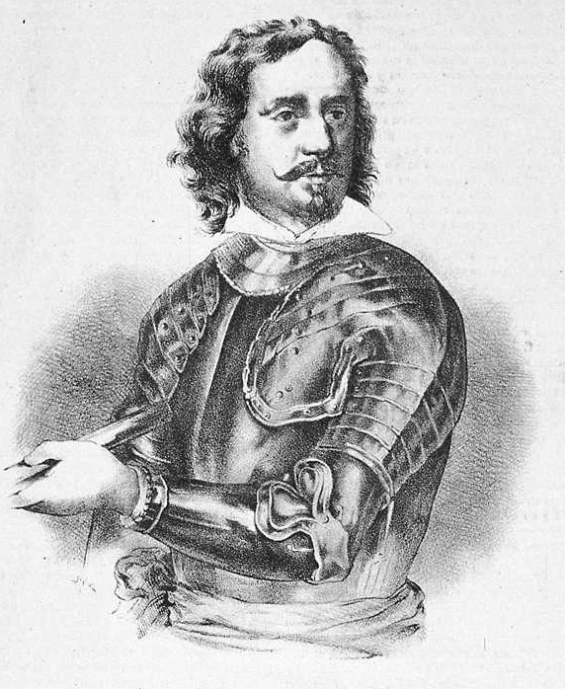
Pedro Fajardo de Zúñiga y Requeséns

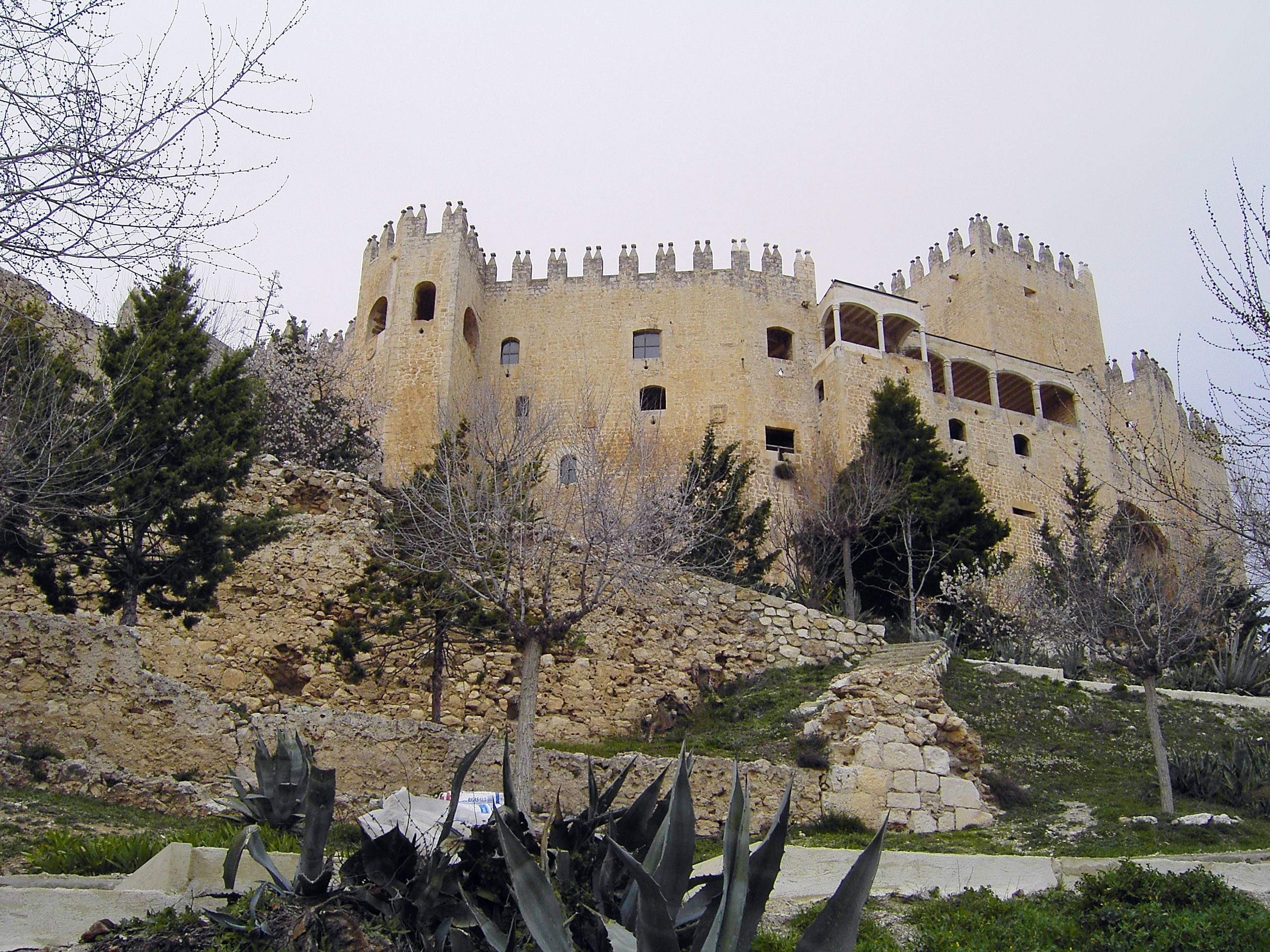
Vélez Blanco Castle is located in the Province of Almería, Spain

Coat of arms of the Marquis of Los Vélez

Pedro III Fajardo de Zúñiga y Requesens (1602 – Palermo, Sicily, 3 November 1647) was a Spanish soldier and noble. He was Viceroy of Valencia (1631–1635), Viceroy of Navarre (1638–1640), Viceroy of Catalonia (1640–1642), Spanish Ambassador to Rome, and Viceroy of Sicily (1644–1647).

== Biography ==
He was 5th Marquis of Los Vélez from 1631, and Grandee of Spain. He was born in Mula, region of Murcia, son of Luis II Fajardo, 4th Marquis of Los Vélez, (1576–1631), the preceding Viceroy of Valencia (1628–1631) and a great-grandson of Luis de Zúñiga y Requesens.

He joined the Spanish army and rose up through the ranks to become general. He was Viceroy of Valencia (1631–1636), Viceroy of Navarre (1638–1640). In 1641, when the Catalan Revolt broke out, he led a Spanish force into Catalonia which aimed to capture Barcelona and crush the revolt. Defeated at the Battle of Montjuïc in 1641, and forced to withdraw along the coast to Tarragona, which proved a devastating defeat to Spanish morale, he was dismissed and replaced as Viceroy of Catalonia by Pedro Antonio de Aragón (1642–1644). Afterwards he was appointed Viceroy of Sicily, 1644–1647.

=== Marriage and children ===
He married Ana, a daughter of Fernando Afán de Ribera y Téllez-Girón, 3rd Duke of Alcalá de los Gazules, Viceroy of Naples, deceased 1636. There was no issue from this marriage.

He remarried with Mariana Engracia Álvarez de Toledo, from the family of the 6th Counts of Oropesa.
He was from his second marriage, the father of Fernando Joaquín Fajardo de Requeséns y Zúñiga, who went on to become Viceroy of Sardinia (1673–1675) and Viceroy of Naples (1675–1683).

He died in Palermo, Sicily.

Government offices
Preceded by Girolamo Carraffa e Carrascciolo	Viceroy of Aragon; 1635–1638	Succeeded by Francesco Maria Carraffa e Carraffa
Preceded by Fernando de Andrade y Sotomayor, Archbishop of Burgos	Viceroy of Navarre; 1638–1640	Succeeded by Francesco Maria Carraffa e Carraffa
Preceded by García Gil Manrique	Viceroy of Catalonia; 1640–1641	Succeeded by Pedro Antonio de Aragón
Preceded by Juan Alfonso Enríquez de Cabrera	Viceroy of Sicily; 1644–1646	Succeeded by Vicente de Guzmán
