= Francesc de Tamarit =

Francesc de Tamarit i de Rifà (1584–1653) was a Catalan Marshal and the military deputy of the Principality of Catalonia (1639–1641) voted by the Catalan aristocracy, notable for his service in the Reapers' War, particularly at the Battle of Montjuïc in 1641 where the forces of the Catalan army defeated a much larger Spanish army.

He was born in Barcelona, Spain. The son of Pere de Tamarit, he was member of the Consell de Cent.

== Bibliography ==
- Que i Parcerisa, Salvador (2014). "Francesc de Tamarit i el seu llinatge" [Francesc de Tamarit and his lineage]. Sant Andreu de Palomar. De Francesc de Tamarit al Decret de Nova Planta (in Catalan). Barcelona: Ajuntament de Barcelona. pp. 235–311. ISBN 978-84-9850-566-5.
