= Junta de Braços =

Institution of the Principality of Catalonia

The Junta de Braços or Braços Generals (States-General) was, during the early modern age, an institution of the Principality of Catalonia, convened by the Generalitat of Catalonia in cases of emergency or urgency. It was composed by the representatives of the Catalan Courts who at that time were in Barcelona.

The decision to convene the Junta de Braços was to be taken by the three deputies and the three oïdors that formed the Generalitat. It was constituted following the same system of the Catalan Courts, that is, by bringing together the members of the three estates of the realm: the ecclesiastic formed by the clergy, the military formed by the nobility, and the popular formed by royal towns and cities of the country. Only those who lived in Barcelona (or who were at that time) were summoned, due to the urgent nature of the issues that had to be raised and the precarious communications of the time made it impossible for a general call for all of Catalonia. This favored the presence of a majority of Barcelona residents, and of a greater number of nobles who lived in the city; and the presence of the ciutadans honrats (honorable citizens) of Barcelona was accepted, even though on an individual basis.
