= Dalmau de Queralt, Count of Santa Coloma =

Catalan noble (died 1640)

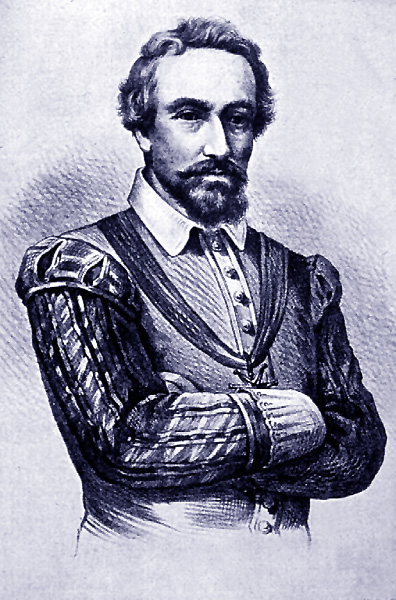
Dalmau de Queralt, count of Santa Coloma

Dalmau de Queralt i de Codina, Count of Santa Coloma (Catalan pronunciation: [dəlˈmaw ðə kəˈɾal]; died 7 June 1640, Barcelona), was a Catalan noble, viceroy of Catalonia between 1638 and 1640, who was assassinated by Catalan rebels at the beginning of the Catalan Revolt.

== Biography ==
Dalmau was the son of Pere de Queralt and Icart Cardona i Luyando, first Count of Santa Coloma, and his wife Maria Codina.

He was named viceroy in 1638 by Philip IV, after the resignation of Enrique de Aragón Folc de Cardona y Córdoba. During the years 1639 and 1640 he participated in the campaigns of Roussillon against the French as the adjutant of Filippo Espínola, generalissimo of the armies of the Spanish monarchy on the frontier with France, in the framework of the Thirty Years War. His greatest victory was the Siege of Salses.
