= Battle of Barcelona =

1642 battle of the Franco-Spanish War (1635–59)

Coordinates: 41.4019°N 2.1667°E

- Part of the Franco-Spanish War (1635–59)
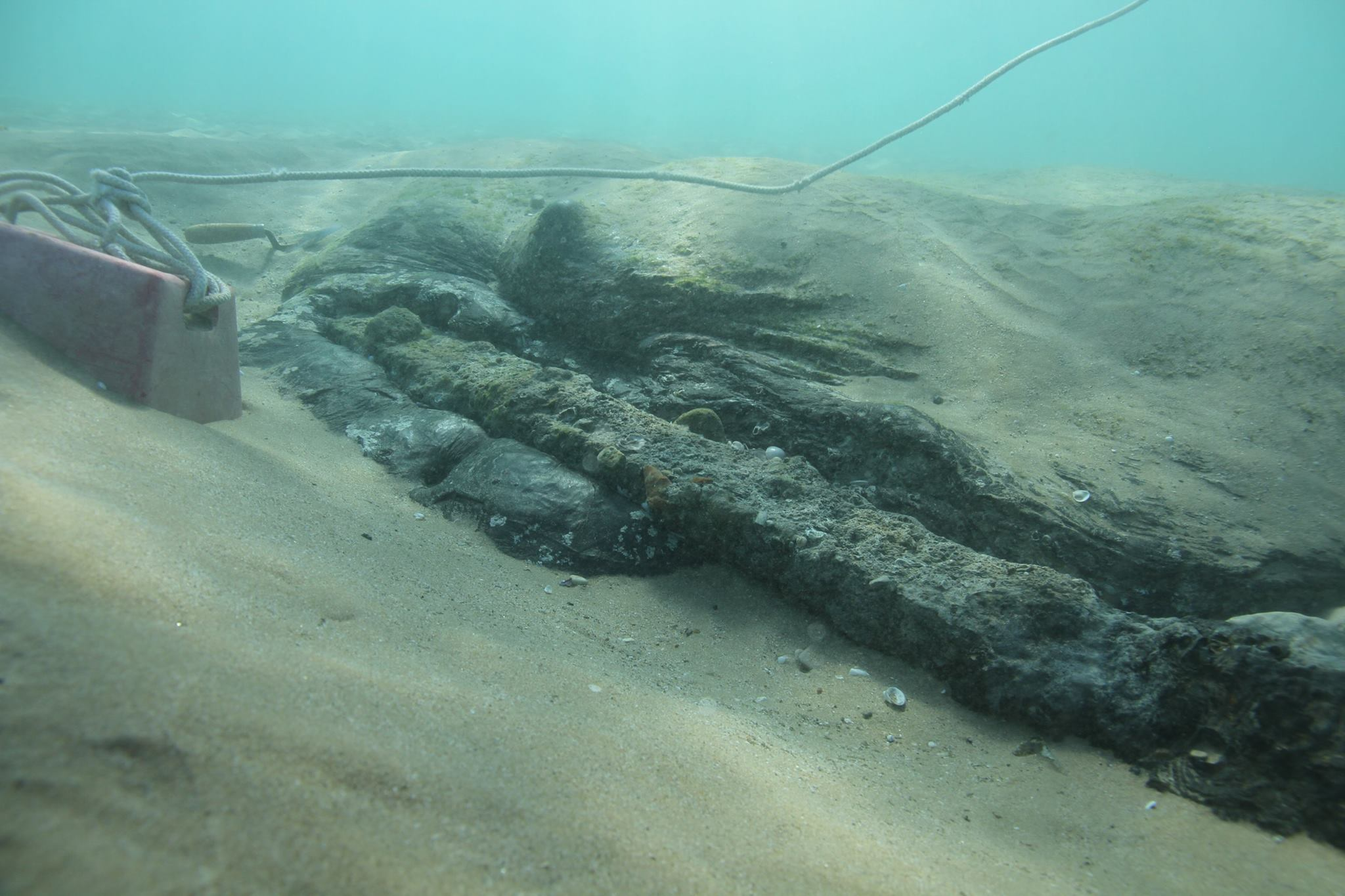
- Probable remains of the French De Marsay outbreak, located in 2015 near the coast of Sitges
Date	29 June – 3 July 1642
Location	Off Barcelona, Principality of Catalonia
Result	French victory

Belligerents
France	Spain

Commanders and leaders
(Kingdom of France) Jean Armand de Maillé-Brézé	(Spain) Juan Alonso Idiáquez

Strength
44 sailing vessels, 17 galleys, 14 fireships	36 sailing vessels, 10 galleys, 6 fireships, 35 barcos longos

Casualties and losses
800 killed and wounded 1 galleon destroyed	1,600 killed, wounded and captured 2 galleons destroyed, 1 galleon captured

The naval battle of Barcelona was a naval engagement of the Franco-Habsburg War fought off Barcelona from 29 June to 3 July 1642 between a Spanish fleet commanded by Juan Alonso Idiáquez, Duke of Ciudad Real, and a French fleet under Jean Armand de Maillé-Brézé, Duc de Fronsac.
In a three-day battle, Brézé defeated the Spanish fleet, which was attempting to relieve some Spanish garrisons isolated along the Catalan coast, and forced the Duke of Ciudad Real to retreat to Majorca for repairs. As usual in most of the battles involving Maillé-Brézé, the French fleet made an extensive use of her fireships. This time, however, a large French vice-flagship, the Galion de Guise, fell victim to one of his own fireships and went down enveloped in flames. The victory, in any case, was for the French fleet, and its main long-term effect was the fall of Perpignan into the hands of the Franco-Catalan army.

== Background ==
The outbreak in 1640 of the Reapers' War, or the Catalan Uprising against the Spanish Monarchy, left most of the Principality in hands of the rebels and their French allies by mid-1641. The Spanish forces were restricted to the area around Tarragona and Tortosa in the south and the County of Roussillon in the north, besides a series of isolated ports along the coast. The French viceroy of Catalonia, Philippe de La Mothe-Houdancourt, attempted to conquer Tarragona between May and August, but failed, as a French blockading fleet under Henri d'Escoubleau de Sourdis was not big enough to prevent the entrance into Tarragona of a large Spanish relief convoy. Sourdis had been never very enthusiastic of blockading Tarragona and preferred to focus all the efforts in capturing Collioure to starve the Spanish army in Perpignan. Cardinal Richelieu replaced him with his nephew Jean Armand de Maillé-Brézé, but for the 1642 campaign he followed his plans and committed most of his forces to conquer Rousillon.

== French preparations ==
Marshall Charles de La Porte gained Collioure on 13 April and, together with Frederick Schomberg, laid siege to Perpignan. The French fleet would blockade the coast between Tarragona and Collioure, and battle with the Spanish fleet if necessary. The fleets of Ponant and Levant were concentrated at Barcelona. The squadron of Brest, composed of 21 sailing vessels, 2 fluyts, and 6 fireships, doubled the Cabo de Gata on 10 June. The Toulon squadron, of 19 sailing vessels, 4 fluyts, and 6 fireships under the Chevalier de Cangé, arrived to Barcelona on 8 May. The flotte des galères led by the bailli de Forbin, composed of 25 units, arrived on 21 June. The fleet was completed with a small squadron under Abraham Duquesne which had been left to cruise off the Catalan coast, and ten English and Dutch chartered vessels, thus increasing its strength to nearly 60 ships. After a war council was held aboard the fleet on 22 June, Maillé-Brézé put his ships on sail in order to intercept a Spanish fleet reportedly seen at the height of Tarragona.

== Spanish preparations ==
Spanish naval officials tried to have ready on time the Spanish fleet to avoid the conjunction of the French Levant and Ponant fleets, but failed, and therefore focused on collecting as many ships as possible for a relief fleet that was supposed to relieve the maritime garrisons isolated along the coast, and specifically the much tightened Rousillon. The maritime relief was the only way, as a land army organized to cross the country till Perpignan had been defeated by La Mothe-Houdancourt at the Battle of Montmeló and the subsequent Battle of La Granada, in which Count Pedro Antonio de Aragón, his lieutenant Gerolamo Caracciolo, and the entire force of some 3,500 men, were made prisoners. In view of the defeat, the whole Castile was put on the warpath. Foreign and private ships were seized, silver from individuals was melted to mint coins to pay troops, and soon Cádiz was full of soldiers and seamen come from all over the country. The Duke of Ciudad Real, a man devoid of experience in naval fighting, was the chief of the fleet. He was seconded by Admiral General Sancho de Urdanivia. The force consisted of 31 galleons or large sailing vessels, 2 frigates, 3 pataches, 6 fireships, 10 galleys, a convoy of tartanes, and 35 barcos longos, a newly invented sort of counter-fireship.

== The battle ==
The Spanish fleet arrived off Barcelona on 29 June around 15:00h, and despite the late hour, the rough seas, and not being complete, they immediately attacked the French. The battle raged until sunset. The Spanish tried to board some French ships, but without success. The French launched one fireship and the Spanish three, but also without any effect.

The next day, the slower Spanish galleys had reached Barcelona, and the complete Spanish fleet attacked again. Now the Magdalena and some smaller Spanish ships were able to isolate the large French Galion de Guise, and threatened to board the ship. The French launched a fireship against the Magdalena, but the Spanish crew was able to deviate the fireship towards the Galion de Guise which caught fire and went up in flames, together with its commander Vice Admiral Hercule de Conigan de Cangé, 500 French out of a total crew of 540, and 30 Spaniards.

On 3 July the battle resumed, but now the French artillery prevailed and several Spanish ships were seriously damaged. The Duke of Ciudad Real was forced to retreat and the victory was for the French.

== Bibliography ==
- Bodart, Gaston (1908). Militär-Historisches Kriegs-Lexikon (in German). Vienna.
- Balaguer, Víctor (1885). Historia de Cataluña. Vol VIII (in Spanish). Madrid: Impr. y fundición de M. Tello.
- Fernández Duro, Cesáreo (1972). Armada española desde la unión de los reinos de Castilla y de León, Volume 6. Museo Naval.
- La Bruyère, René (1945). "XIX - Plan de Campagne 1643". La marine de Richelieu (in French). Paris: E. Plon, Nouritt.
- La Roncière, Charles de (1899). Histoire de la marine française. Vol I (in French). Paris: E. Plon, Nourrit.
