= Calabar (disambiguation) =

Calabar is a city in Nigeria.

Calabar may also refer to:

- Calabar angwantibo or Calabar potto, a primate
- Calabar bean
- Calabar python
- Calabar River, Nigeria
- Domingos Fernandes Calabar (c. 1600–1635) was a Brazilian soldier and smuggler

== See also ==
- Calabar Kingdom (disambiguation)
