= Siege of Gravelines =

1644 siege during the Franco-Spanish War

- Part of 1635 to 1659 Franco-Spanish War
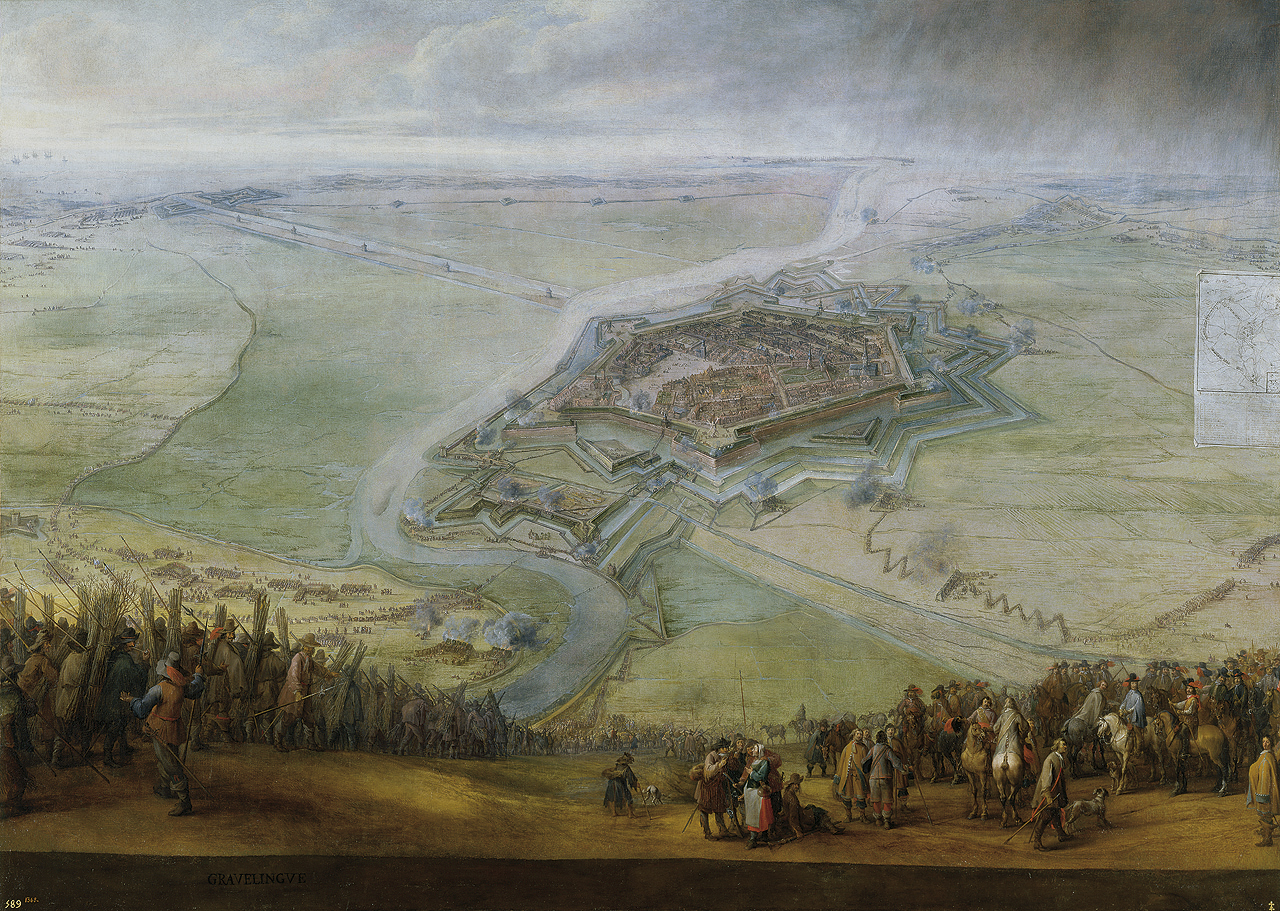
- Siege of Gravelines, 1644 by Peter Snayers
Date	28 May to 28 July 1644
Location	Gravelines, Nord region
Result	French victory

Belligerents
France	Spain

Commanders and leaders
(Kingdom of France) Gaston of Orléans (Kingdom of France) Charles de La Porte (Kingdom of France) Jean de Gassion	(Spanish Empire) Francisco de Melo

Strength
20,000	2,200

Casualties and losses
Unknown	Unknown

The Siege of Gravelines, May to July 1644, took place during the 1635–1659 Franco-Spanish War. A French army captured the port of Gravelines, then in the Spanish Netherlands, now the Pas-de-Calais region of northern France.

Siege operations began on 28 May 1644 and the town surrendered on 28 July. Recaptured by the Spanish in 1652, it changed hands again in 1658 before being ceded to France permanently in the 1659 Treaty of the Pyrenees.

== Background ==
17th century Europe was dominated by the long running French–Habsburg rivalry between France, and their Habsburg rivals in Spain and the Holy Roman Empire. Habsburg territories in the Spanish Netherlands, Franche-Comté, and the Pyrenees blocked French expansion, and made it vulnerable to invasion. Despite their shared Catholicism, the French supported Habsburg opponents irrespective of religion, including the Muslim Ottomans. They also backed Protestant allies in the Dutch revolt, and 1618 to 1648 Thirty Years' War.

In 1635, Louis XIII agreed to divide the Spanish Netherlands with the Dutch Republic, and declared war on Spain. The Spanish repulsed a French attack in the Netherlands and in 1636 took the offensive, reaching Corbie in Northern France before withdrawing. This led to a change in tactics; the French refocused on strengthening their borders, capturing Arras in 1640, then Perpignan two years later. On 19 May 1643, the Spanish Army of Flanders was defeated by Condé, at Rocroi, which was followed by advances in the strategic Lorraine region.

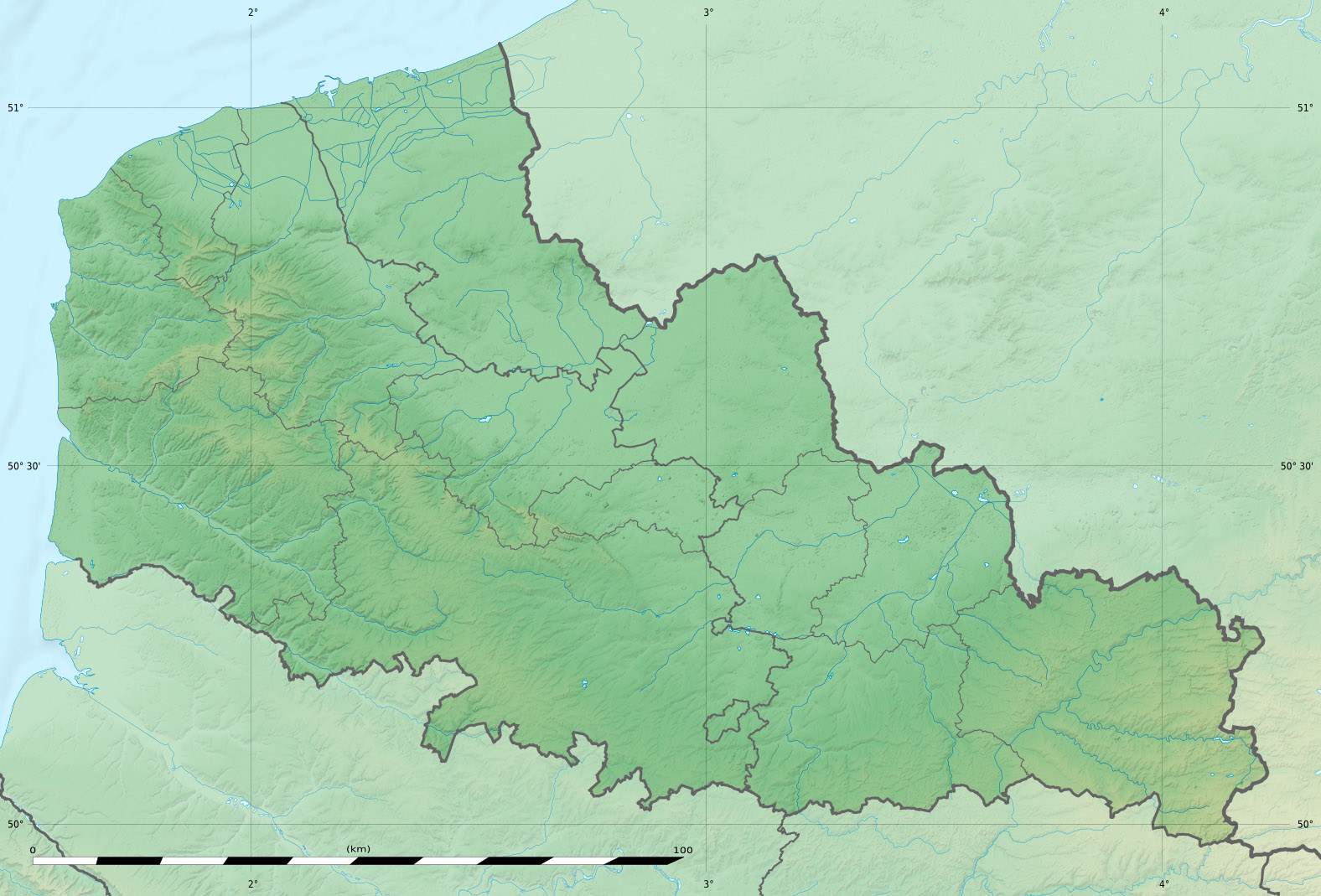
The Pas-de-Calais region, 1644 (showing modern France-Belgium border)

Shortly before Rocroi, Louis XIII died and was succeeded by his five-year-old son, Louis XIV. His minority led to a power struggle between his mother, Anne of Austria, supported by Cardinal Mazarin, and his uncle, Gaston, duc d'Orléans. Allegedly jealous of Condé, Orléans insisted on an offensive in French Flanders, rather than consolidating the gains of 1643.

The main objective for 1644 was Gravelines, one end of a line of defences along the border between France and the Spanish Netherlands. The Dutch would simultaneously attack Sas van Gent in the north, while their fleet prevented the Spanish resupplying Gravelines. Faced by this double threat, Francisco de Melo, Governor of the Spanish Netherlands, prioritised retaining the northern Flemish ports of Ghent and Antwerp, so Gravelines could not expect to be relieved.

== Siege ==
The marshy ground surrounding Gravelines meant its siege required an army of around 20,000, which arrived on 28 May. Nominally commanded by Orléans, operations were conducted by La Meilleraye, the Master of Artillery, and de Gassion, D'Enghien's deputy at Rocroi. Both were experienced and capable but proved unable to work together effectively.

The attackers first had to capture a small outer work known as Fort St Philippe; after it fell on 13 June, the siege of the town began. The French constructed two sets of trenches, one from the east, the other from the south, each supervised by one of the senior commanders. As Master of Artillery, La Meilleraye controlled trenching supplies, which de Gassion later claimed he refused to share.

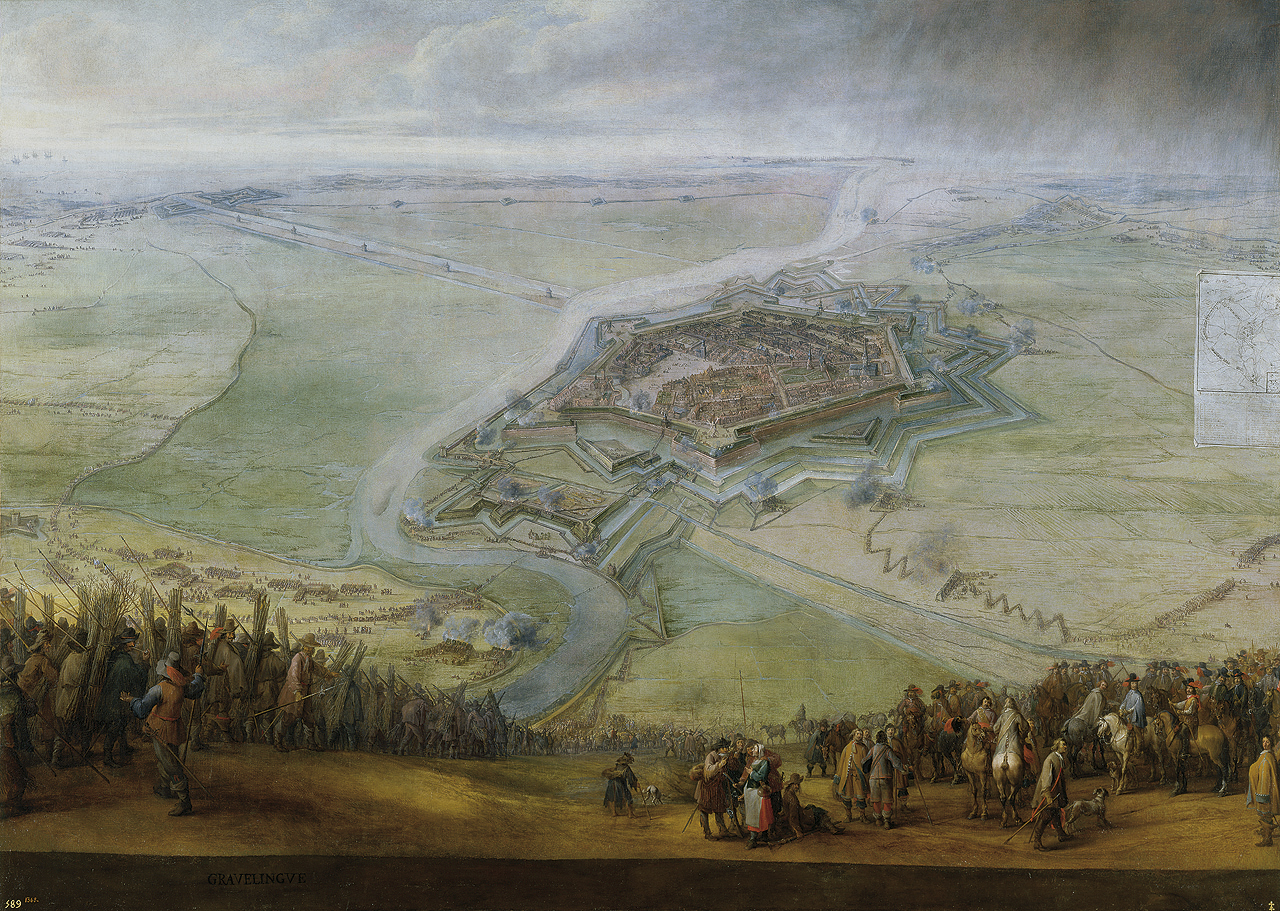
Siege of Gravelines 1644, by Pieter Snayers

An artillery battery of 20 guns was constructed where the trenches met up, and began firing on 20th. Operations progressed slowly, the defenders repulsing four separate attacks before the French established themselves on the outer walls on 26 July. Under the rules of war, if the defenders surrendered once this happened, they could leave with their weapons and possessions; if not, they would be killed and the town sacked. With no hope of relief, and having held up the main French army for two months, the Spanish garrison 'beat the chamade' on 28 July, and received safe passage to Dunkirk. After nearly coming to blows over who should enter the town first, La Meilleraye returned to Paris, leaving De Gassion at Watten.

== Aftermath ==
In September, the Dutch captured Sas van Gent, but doing so had absorbed the entire campaigning season, a reasonable exchange for the Spanish, who retook Gravelines in 1652. Failure to gain a decisive victory was in part due to competing objectives in the Spanish Netherlands, where the French wanted their own ports to control their trade. Much of it was currently handled by Amsterdam, which had become the richest city in Europe as a result. It was also capital of the States of Holland, whose taxes produced over 60% of the national budget.

In 1645, the French besieged Bruges, a town allocated to the Dutch in the 1635 treaty; in 1646, a combined attack on Antwerp was cancelled after news of a proposed marriage contract between seven year old Louis XIV and Maria Theresa of Spain. Although Mazarin denied any such agreement, he admitted discussions had taken place in which he had suggested the Spanish Netherlands form part of her dowry. Alarmed by the prospect of these territories being controlled by France, the Dutch agreed the 1648 Peace of Münster with Spain, which confirmed their independence.

== Sources ==
- Black, Jeremy (2002). European Warfare, 1494-1660. Routledge. ISBN 978-0415275316.
- De Périni, Hardÿ (1896). Batailles françaises, Volume IV (in French). Ernest Flammarion.;
- Israel, Jonathan (1989). Dutch Primacy in World Trade, 1585–1740 (1990 ed.). Oxford University Press. ISBN 978-0198211396.
- Jensen, De Lamar (1985). "The Ottoman Turks in Sixteenth Century French Diplomacy". The Sixteenth Century Journal. 16 (4): 451–470. doi:10.2307/2541220. JSTOR 2541220.
- Poot, Anton (2013). Crucial years in Anglo-Dutch relations (1625-1642): the political and diplomatic contacts. Uitgeverij Verloren. ISBN 978-9087043803.
- Van Nimwegen, Olaf (2014). Asbach, Olaf; Schröder, Peter (eds.). The Dutch-Spanish War in the Low Countries, 1621-1648 in The Ashgate Research Companion to the Thirty Years' War. Ashgate. ISBN 978-1409406297.
- Wedgwood, CV (1938). The Thirty Years War (2005 ed.). New York Review of Books. ISBN 978-1590171462.
