= Francisco de Orozco, 2nd Marquis of Mortara =

17th-century Italian-born military officer and politician

General Francisco de Orozco 2nd Marquis of Mortara 1st Marquis of Solias 1st Marquis of Olis
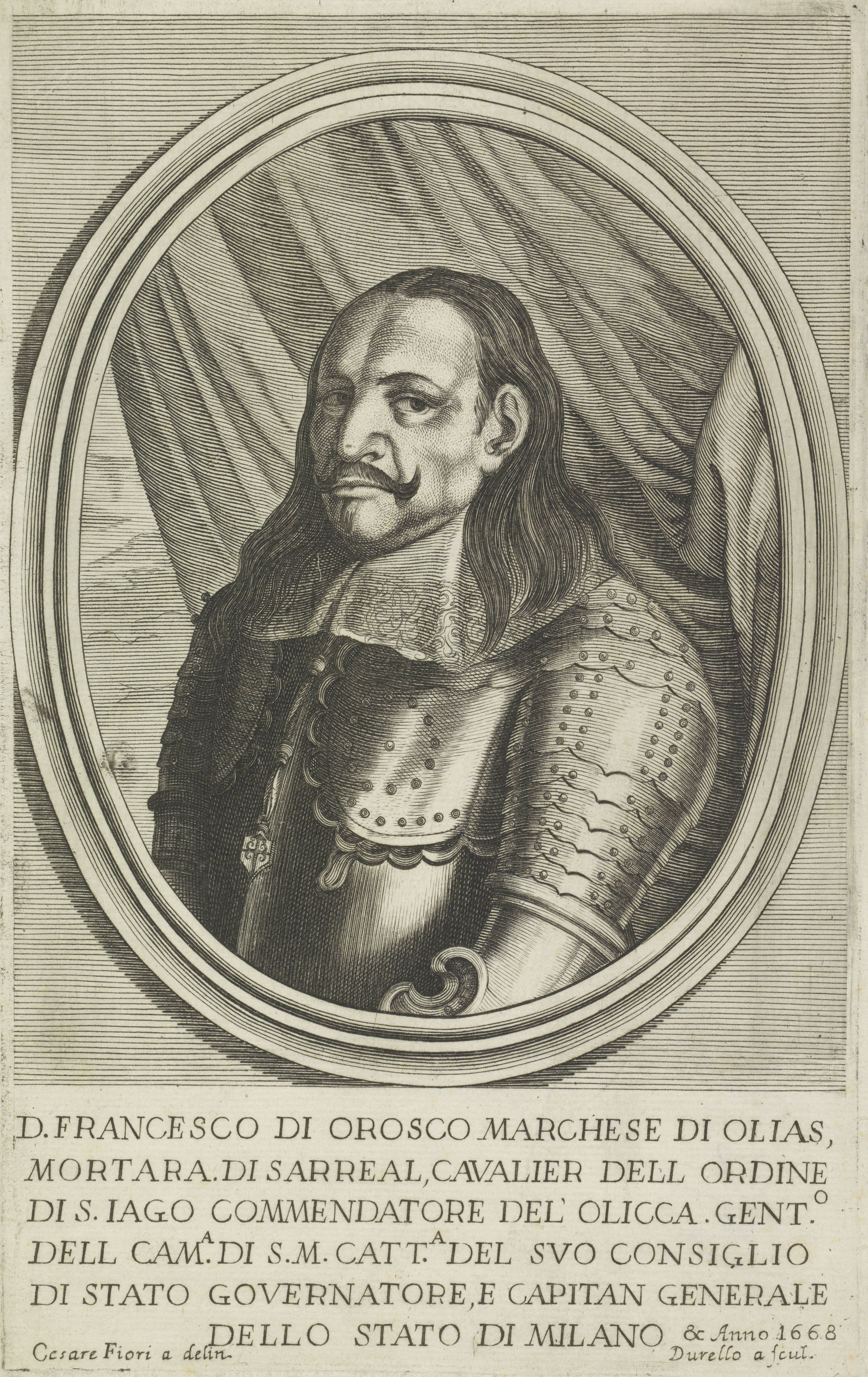
- Portrait of Francisco de Orozco, Marquis of Olías, governor and captain general of the state of Milan, 1668
- Born: Francisco de Orozco y Ribera; 1605; Alessandria, Duchy of Milan, Spanish Empire
- Died: 25 December 1668 (aged 62–63); Milan, Duchy of Milan, Spanish Empire
- Spouse: Isabel Manrique de Lara
- Children: Juan José Antonio de Orozco y Manrique de Lara; Manuel de Orozco y Manrique de Lara; María Victoria de Orozco y Manrique de Lara
- Relatives: Rodrigo de Orozco (father); Victoria de Porcia (mother)
- Military career
- Allegiance: Spanish Empire; Duchy of Milan
- Branch: (Spain) Spanish Army (Spain) (Duchy of Milan) Spanish Army in Milan
- Service years: 1620–1668
- Rank: General
- Conflicts: Franco-Spanish War: Northern Italy campaign; Battle of Vercelli; Campaign of Valtellina; Siege of Leucata; Relief of Fuenterrabía; Battle of Segre Pass; Reapers' War; Battle of Lleida; Battle of San Lorenzo de Montgai; Siege of Barcelona; Battle of Camprodón and Ter

Viceroy of Catalonia
- In office 1650 – 23 January 1653
- Monarch: Philp IV
- Preceded by: Juan de Garay Otañez
- Succeeded by: John Joseph of Austria
- In office 1656–1663
- Monarch: Philp IV
- Preceded by: John Joseph of Austria
- Succeeded by: Francisco de Moura Corte Real

Governor of the Duchy of Milan
- In office 26 June – 25 December 1668
- Monarch: Charles II
- Regent: Mariana of Austria
- Valido: Juan Everardo Nithard
- Preceded by: Paolo Spinola
- Succeeded by: Paolo Spinola

Francisco de Orozco y Ribera (Alessandria, Duchy of Milan, c. 1603–1605 – Milan, 26 December 1668), 2nd Marquis of Mortara and 1st Marquis of Olías and Zarreal, was a military and politician of Italian origin, who served the Spanish monarchy.

== Biography ==
Francisco was the son of Rodrigo de Orozco y Rivera, 1st Marquis of Mortara, and Victoria Porcia, a lady of German origin. His father served Spain on the war fronts of Flanders, Italy, Africa and Portugal, also taking part in the Battle of Lepanto (1571).

Francisco followed in his father's footsteps and fought in Italy and Catalonia, where in 1640 he became captain general of the army in Perpignan. Appointed governor of Rosselló (1640), he became isolated from Castile when the Reapers' War broke out in Catalonia. When the French invaded Roussillon in 1641, he took refuge in the Château Royal de Collioure, but had to withdraw after a siege of 4 weeks.

He then defeated General Philippe de La Mothe-Houdancourt at the Segre Pass (1643) and Lleida (1644), but was defeated by Henri, Count of Harcourt at Sant Llorenç de Montgai (1645), and taken prisoner. Once released, he continued the fight and in 1650 reconquered Balaguer, Tortosa, Flix and Miravet d'Ebre. In 1651 he besieged Barcelona, under the orders of John Joseph of Austria, and in 1652 they achieved the capitulation of Barcelona.

For his intervention in the final phase of the war, he was rewarded with the marquisates of Olías and Zarreal. In 1650-52 he was appointed Viceroy of Catalonia, a position he held again in 1656–63. During this second term, he defeated the French at Camprodon (1658) and the Ter. Also Councilor of state, in 1668 he was sent to Milan as Governor of the Duchy of Milan, where he died a few months later.

He left some works in which he recounts his war actions, such as Conquest of Catalonia.

=== Marriage and children ===
Aged 50, he married in 1653 with Isabel Manrique de Lara and had following children:

- Juan José de Orozco Manrique de Lara (died 1700), III marqués de Mortara, II marqués de Olías and Zarreal,
- Manuel de Orozco, Maestre de campo, killed in battle,
- María Victoria, died young.
