= Montijo, Spain =

Montijo
- City
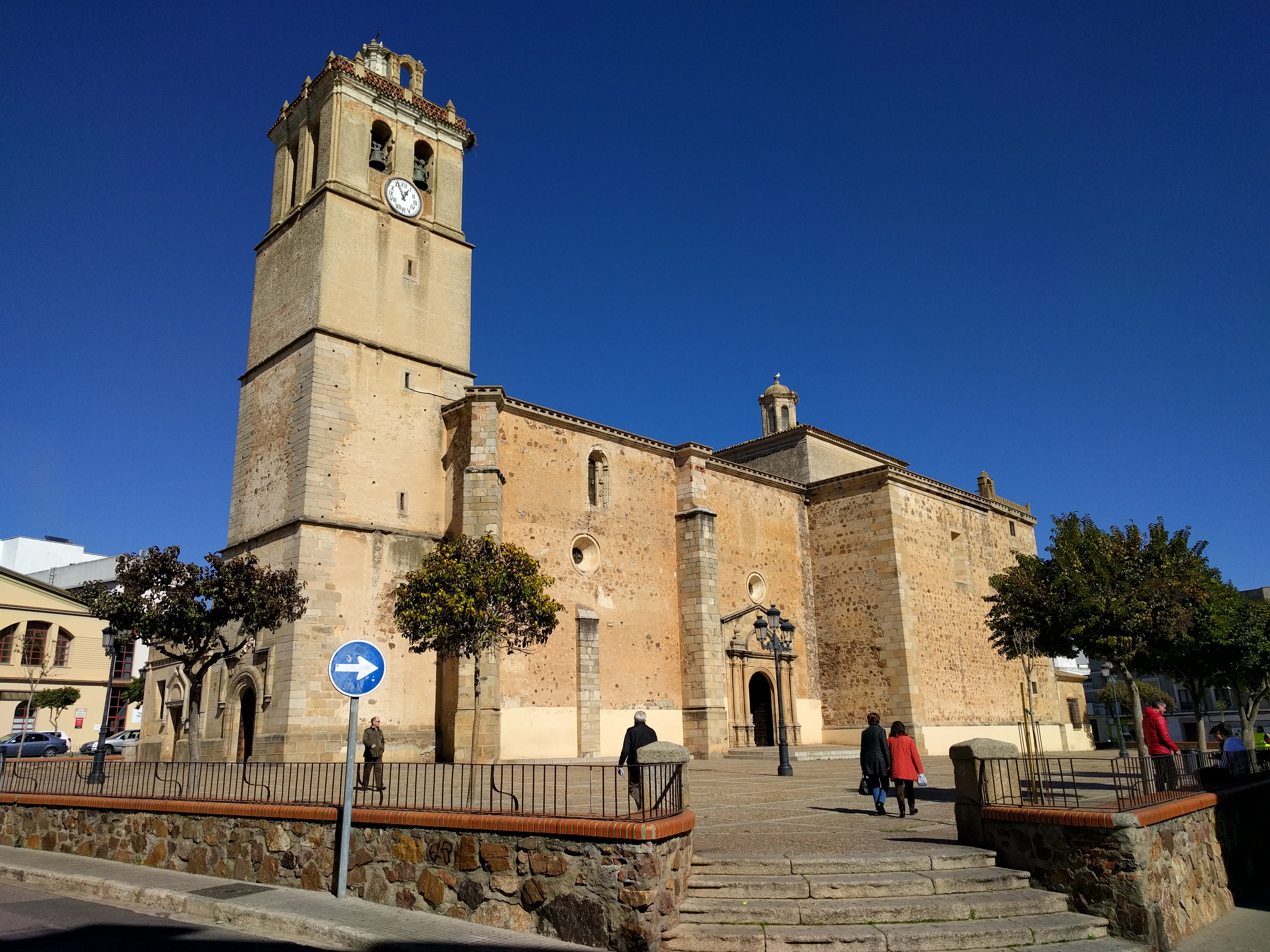
- San Pedro church, Montijo

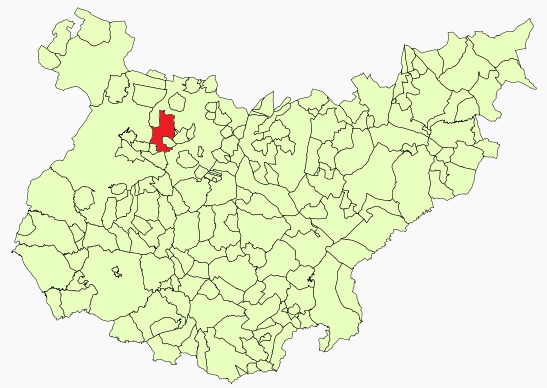
- Location in Badajoz

- Location of Montijo within Extremadura Montijo (Spain)
- Coordinates: 38°54′36″N 6°37′3″W
- Country: Spain
- Autonomous Community: Extremadura
- Province: Badajoz
- Comarca: Tierra de Mérida
- Founded: Prerromanic

Government
  - Mayor: Manuel Gómez Rodríguez (PSOE)

Area
  - Total: 119.7 km^{2} (46.2 sq mi)
- Elevation (AMSL): 201 m (659 ft)

Population (2025-01-01)
  - Total: 15,198
  - Density: 127.0/km^{2} (328.8/sq mi)
- Time zone: UTC+1 (CET)
  - Summer (DST): UTC+2 (CEST (GMT +2))
- Postal code: 06480
- Area code: +34 (Spain) + 924 (Badajoz)
- Website: Official website

Montijo (Spanish: [monˈtixo]) is a town and municipality in the province of Badajoz, in Extremadura, Spain. It has a population of 16,236 inhabitants (in 2010). It is located between Badajoz and Mérida, near Guadiana river banks. The extension of the municipality covers three different centers of population: Lácara, Barbaño and Montijo, the latter being the capital.

== History ==
The Battle of Montijo was fought near the town in 1644.

== See also ==
- Eugénie de Montijo
- List of municipalities in Badajoz
