= Josep Margarit =

French military personnel

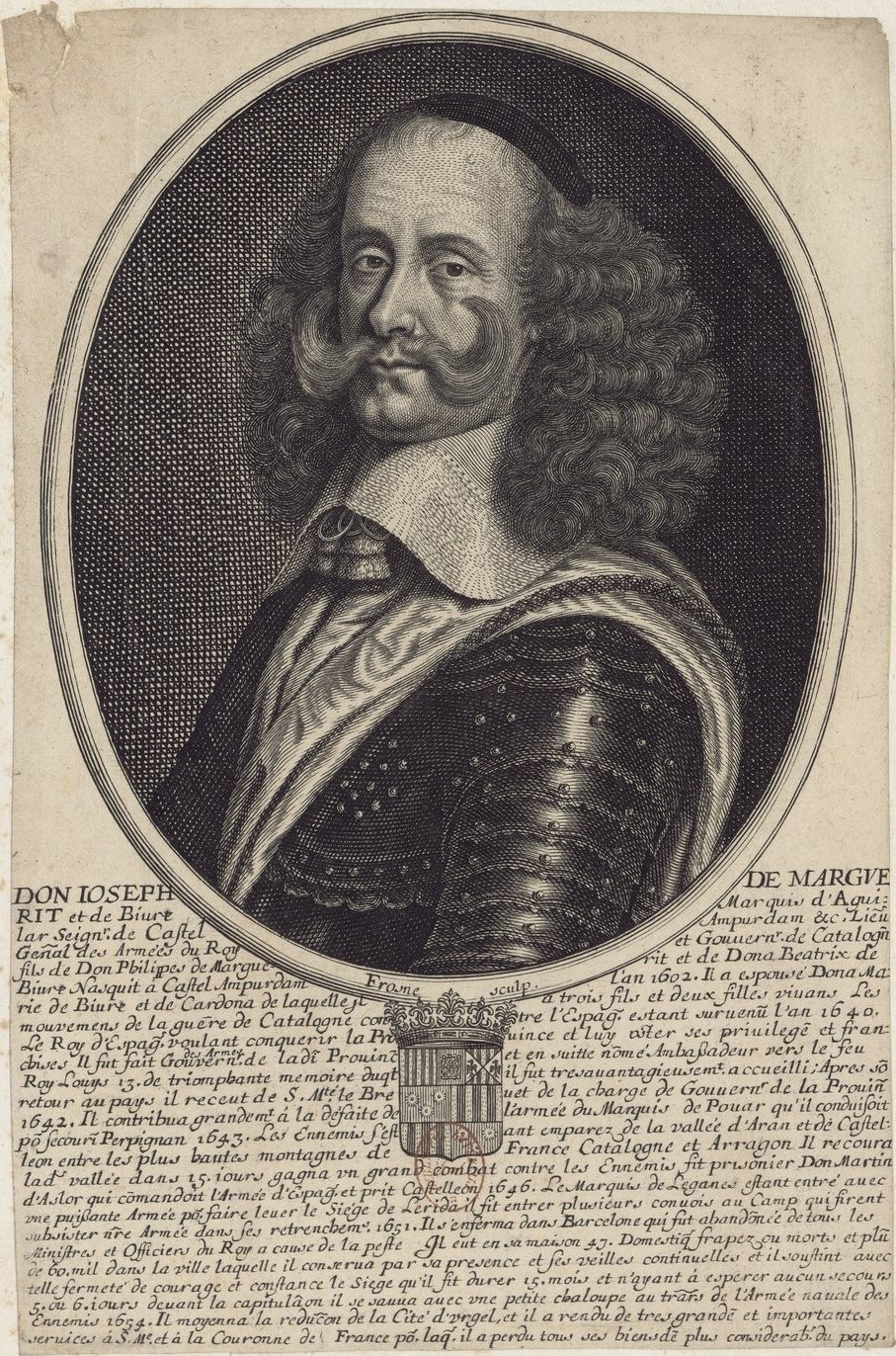
Josep Margarit

Josep de Margarit i de Biure (1602, Castelló d'Empúries–1685, Perpignan) was a leader of the forces of the Generalitat in the Reapers' War.

He led the attack on Constantí, and took part in the Siege of Lleida and the Battle of Montmeló.

In 1641, Louis XIII made him Governor of Catalonia.

In later life, Louis XIV made him Lord of Thuir.

== Sources ==
- entry at Biographie Rousillonaise (French)
- Serrano, Angela Josep Margarit, un patriota catala a la revolta dels Segadors (Spanish)
