= Domingos Fernandes Calabar =

Domingos Fernandes Calabar (c. 1600–1635) was a Portuguese soldier, smuggler, and plantation owner during the time of the intrusion into Brazil by people connected with the Dutch Republic. He first fought for Portugal against the Netherlands before switching sides and fighting for the Netherlands. He was eventually captured and executed by the Portuguese for treason.

== Personal life ==
Little is known of Calabar's life in Brazil. Calabar was born around 1600 in Alagoas, then part of the Captaincy of Pernambuco. He was baptized as a Catholic on 15 March 1610. Calabar studied with the Jesuits, and it is believed that he made money from smuggling. It is also believed that he was a mulatto; however, several chroniclers dispute this and claim that he was a mameluco.

=== With the Portuguese ===
In 1580, Portugal passed under the Spanish rule by marriage of King Philip II with a Portuguese Princess after the death of her brother the King. The Netherlands were an ally of Portugal until then, but an enemy of the Spaniards. Strong merchant ties between the Netherlands and Portugal resulted in the establishment of a truce which lasted until 1621, when fighting between the Dutch and Portuguese began. The Dutch West India Company invaded Bahia, a state of Brazil, and was subsequently expelled in 1625 by a Spanish and Portuguese army.

The grandson of Duarte Coelho, Matias de Albuquerque, Calabar traveled from Spain to Brazil in order to coordinate the defense of the country from Dutch attacks. Portugal gave him only 27 soldiers, but he also recruited native men to serve as soldiers under him. Calabar retreated after Olinda fell to the Dutch and engaged in guerrilla warfare, which was highly effective against the Dutch due to Calabar and his men's superior knowledge of the terrain, which included bays, swamps, rivers, and beaches on the coast and deep jungles in the interior. With his assistance, the Dutch were forced out of Olinda.

== Calabar Joins the Dutch ==
For unknown reasons, Calabar began to fight for the Dutch against the Portuguese in April 1632. For two years he had served among his countrymen, in the process getting wounded twice, gaining fame and becoming renowned. Robert Southey writes (History of Brazil, vol. I, page 349):

If committing a crime, he fled to escape punishment if the treatment they received from the commanders dislike, or, if it is more likely, with treason, expected to improve their fortune, is what you do not know. But it was the first Pernambuco who defected to the Netherlands, and if among all these were given to selection of one, would not have chosen another, so active, shrewd, enterprising and desperate he was, neither was there any better knew the country and the coast.

The Dutch had gained the upper hand, conquering more and more territories, including the towns of Goiás and Igaraçu, the island of Itamaracá, and the fort of Rio Formoso.

Calabar's help was so valuable that even the Three King's Fortress (Forte dos Reis Magos), in Rio Grande do Norte, fell under the domination of the Dutch. Calabar directly participated in the destruction of Ferreira Torto's sugarmill. His dominion extended at that time from the Rio Grande to Recife.

Pudsey, an English mercenary in the service of Holland, described Calabar with great admiration:

Never met a man so adapted to our purposes (...) because he took a small ship and landed us in enemy territory at night, where the inhabitants pilhávamos & much more damage he could cause his countrymen, was his greatest joy.

— Robert Southey, History of Brazil, vol. I

== Capture ==
The conflict between the Spanish and Portuguese and the Dutch lasted five years. Forced to retreat more and more, Matias de Albuquerque went to Alagoas, taking about 8,000 men. Close to Porto Calvo was a group of approximately 380 Dutch, among them Calabar. One resident of this place, Sebastião do Souto, volunteered to infiltrate the Dutch ranks. Souto went to the Dutch commander, Picard, saying that he had changed sides, and convinced him to attack the Portuguese forces of Albuquerque, who Souto said had no more than 200 men.

The trap worked, and when the Dutch troops attacked, they were defeated by Matias de Albuquerque's Portuguese troops and Calabar was captured in the process.

== Execution ==
Calabar was executed for treason against Portugal. He was garroted, quartered, and displayed openly on the palisade fortress. Robert Southey, a historian, says of this:

With much patience received the death, giving many signs of sincere contrition for all his misdeeds, accompanied by so devout hope of forgiveness. the priest confessor Fr Manuel do Salvador who watched the last moments had kept no doubt on the salvation of the sufferer.
Asked if he knew some Portuguese who were in treacherous correspondence with the enemy, Calabar replied that he knew much about this chapter, not being of the lowest people involved

In Porto Calvo, now under the command of Arciszewski, the Netherlands paid him funeral honors.

Two years later, in 1637, Prince Maurice of Nassau came to Brazil. Prince Maurice contributed to the idea that the Dutch colonization would be better than others, something inconsistent compared to the same look on his retirement from Brazil, where he was accused of prejudice to the Company of the West Indies, and have taken the classic model of exploitation exhaustive - which forced the revolt of Brazilians, among them André Vidal de Negreiros, Filipe Camarão and Henrique Dias - treated as heroes of the expulsion of the Netherlands.

== In popular culture ==
The composer Chico Buarque, along with Ruy Guerra, made in 1973 a play entitled: "Calabar: The Praise of Treason" where he first traitor to the condition of Calabar was revisited. This position could be more to report the situation at the time dictatorial than a historiographical overview of the events of the seventeenth century.

In Salvador (Bahia), there are neighborhoods with the name "Calabar." Along these "tributes," some historians try to justify the attitude towards Calabar. They fail to note, however, that he was first the ally of the Portuguese, and had earned their trust, and then served the enemies in highly privileged position.

Calabar is the central character in the alternate history science fiction 1632 series novel, 1636: Calabar's War by Charles E. Gannon and Robert E. Waters.

== Bibliography ==
- Southey, Robert (1774–1843). History of Brazil (Translated by Luis Joaquim de Oliveira and Castro). Belo Horizonte: Ed Itatiaia, New York: Ed University of São Paulo, 1981.
- CINTRA, Assisi. "REHABILITATION OF HISTORIC Calabar. Documented study, which proves that Calabar was not a traitor." Ed Brazilian Civilization. Rio de Janeiro. 1933
