= Siege of Perpignan (1642) =

1641 siege

Coordinates: 42.6986°N 2.8956°E

- Part of the Reapers' War and the Franco-Spanish War (1635–59)
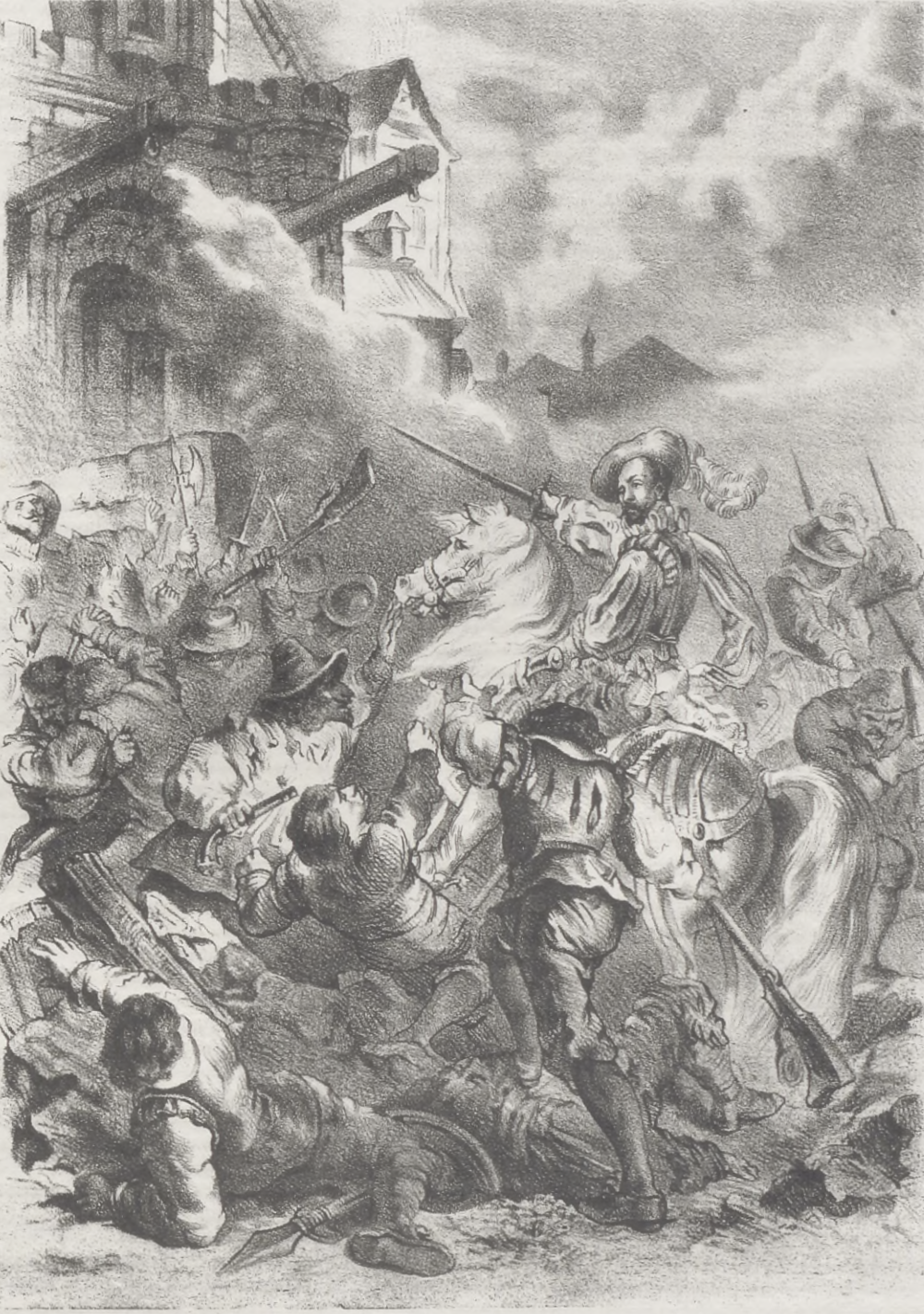
- Sack of Perpignan by the Castillians
Date	4 November 1641 – 9 September 1642
Location	Perpignan, Principality of Catalonia, present-day France
Result	Franco-Catalan victory

Belligerents
Kingdom of France; Principality of Catalonia	Kingdom of Spain

Commanders and leaders
(Kingdom of France) Charles de La Porte, Duke of La Meilleraye (Kingdom of France) Charles de Schomberg	(Spain) Pedro de Zúñiga, Marquis of Flores Dávila (Spain) Francisco de Orozco, Marqués de Mortara

Strength
22,000 infantry 4,000 cavalry	3,000 in Perpignan; 3,400 in Collioure

Casualties and losses
Unknown	2,500 in Perpignan

The siege of Perpignan was a siege during the Catalan Revolt.

== History ==
Already in June 1641, the cities of Perpignan, Salses, Port-Vendres and Collioure were the last strongholds of the Spanish in Roussillon. A French army of 14,000 men conquered the rest of the province and left Perpignan isolated. The siege of the city was then postponed, as the bulk of the French army marched south to participate in the Siege of Tarragona in August.

In the meantime, the blockade of Perpignan was maintained by the remaining French troops, which led to famine in the city. The Spanish succeed in breaking the siege between 4–8 January 1642, when the Marquis of Mortara and Carlo Andrea Caracciolo, Marquis of Torrecusa, managed to conquer Argelès-sur-Mer, opening the way for a convoy with grain from Collioure to enter Perpignan.

On 25 January, a new French army of 25,000 infantry and 4,000 cavalry under command of Charles de La Porte, 1st Duke of La Meilleraye, accompanied by King Louis XIII and Cardinal Richelieu, left Paris for Roussillon where it arrived on 10 March. First, Argelès-sur-Mer was retaken and on 11 April, the Château Royal de Collioure, bravely defended by 3,400 men under command of the Marquis of Mortara, was also conquered after a siege of 4 weeks.

La Meilleraye now surrounded Perpignan with his entire army and waited for the famine to force the Spanish into surrender. The King himself remained present during spring 1642, but left before the conquest of the city. Two Spanish attempts to relieve the city failed: on land in the Battle of Montmeló on 28 March and at sea in the Battle of Barcelona in July.

By then end of August all horses had been eaten, and the first cases of cannibalism on children were reported. The governor, the Marquis de Flores Dávila, was forced to surrender the city on 9 September 1642, because of the increasing number of casualties by hunger, and because the Spanish garrison had been reduced to only 500 able-bodied men.
The city was then occupied by French troops supported by the Catalan rebels. In the city, the French army captured a very large arsenal of the Spanish army: 120 cannons and 20,000 rifles.

== Consequences ==
After the fall of Perpignan, the Fort de Salses remained completely isolated without any hope of relief, and therefore also surrendered.
The whole of the Roussillon had fallen into French hands and remained French until today, because of the Treaty of the Pyrenees in 1659.

== Sources ==
- Gallica: Siège de Perpignan. 1641-1642. Extrait de l'"Histoire du Roussillon depuis 1639 jusqu'à nos jours", by M. Ernest Delamont
- Histoire du Roussillon by Jean de Gazanyola. P. 373-380
