= Siege of Lleida (1644) =

1644 siege during the Reapers' War

Coordinates: 41.6200°N 0.6258°E

- Part of Reapers' War and the Franco-Spanish War (1635–59)
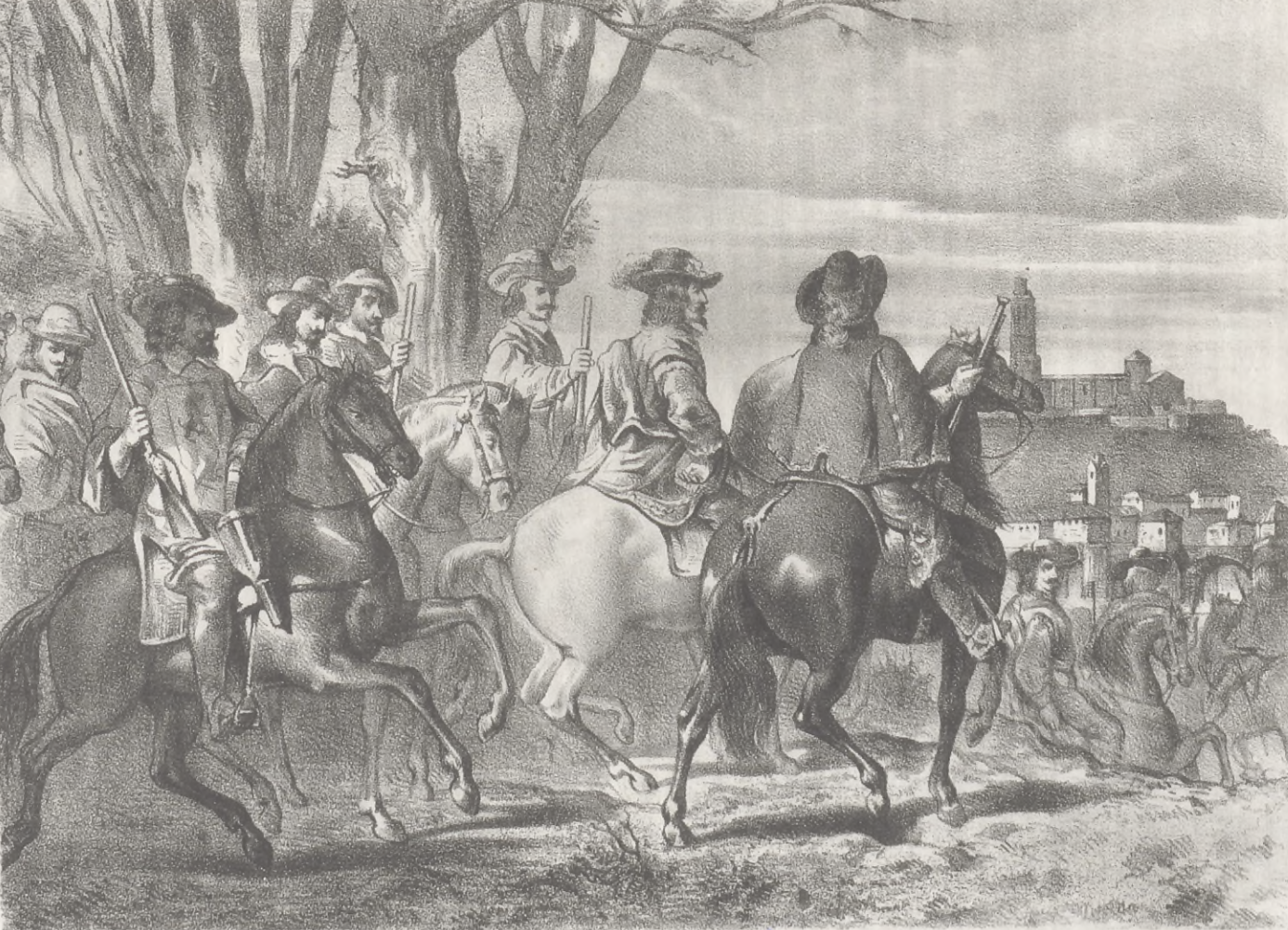
- Entrance of Philip IV to Lérida
Date	May – 30 July 1644
Location	Lleida, Principality of Catalonia
Result	Spanish victory

Belligerents
France; Principality of Catalonia	Spain

Commanders and leaders
(Kingdom of France) Philippe de La Mothe (Principality of Catalonia) Josep Margarit	(Spain) Don Felipe da Silva (Spain) Francisco de Orozco

Siege of Lleida took place between May – 30 July 1644 during the Reapers' War when a Spanish force under Felipe da Silva besieged and attacked the Franco-Catalan garrison of Lleida—after intense fighting the city finally surrendered on 30 July. Located between Aragon and Catalonia, once captured, the city's citadel served to support the Spanish troops' offensive eastwards towards Barcelona.

Philippe de La Mothe-Houdancourt, who failed to lift the Spanish siege was replaced by Henri de Lorraine, count of Harcourt. The Spanish took Balaguer in September and Agramunt in October. After the conquest of Roses, the frontline stabilized for a few years, until the Spanish Siege of Barcelona (1651).

Once the terms of surrender had been signed, King Philip IV, who had been on the scene since the early days of the siege, having the reviewed the troops stationed there on May 2, marched through the city on August 8.

== Velázquez's Portrait of Philip IV ==
During the siege, King Philip sat for Diego Velazquez on three occasions at a makeshift studio in the nearby town of Fraga.

== See also ==
- Battles and sieges of Lleida
