= Battle of Montijo =

1644 battle between Portugal and Spain

- Part of the Portuguese Restoration War
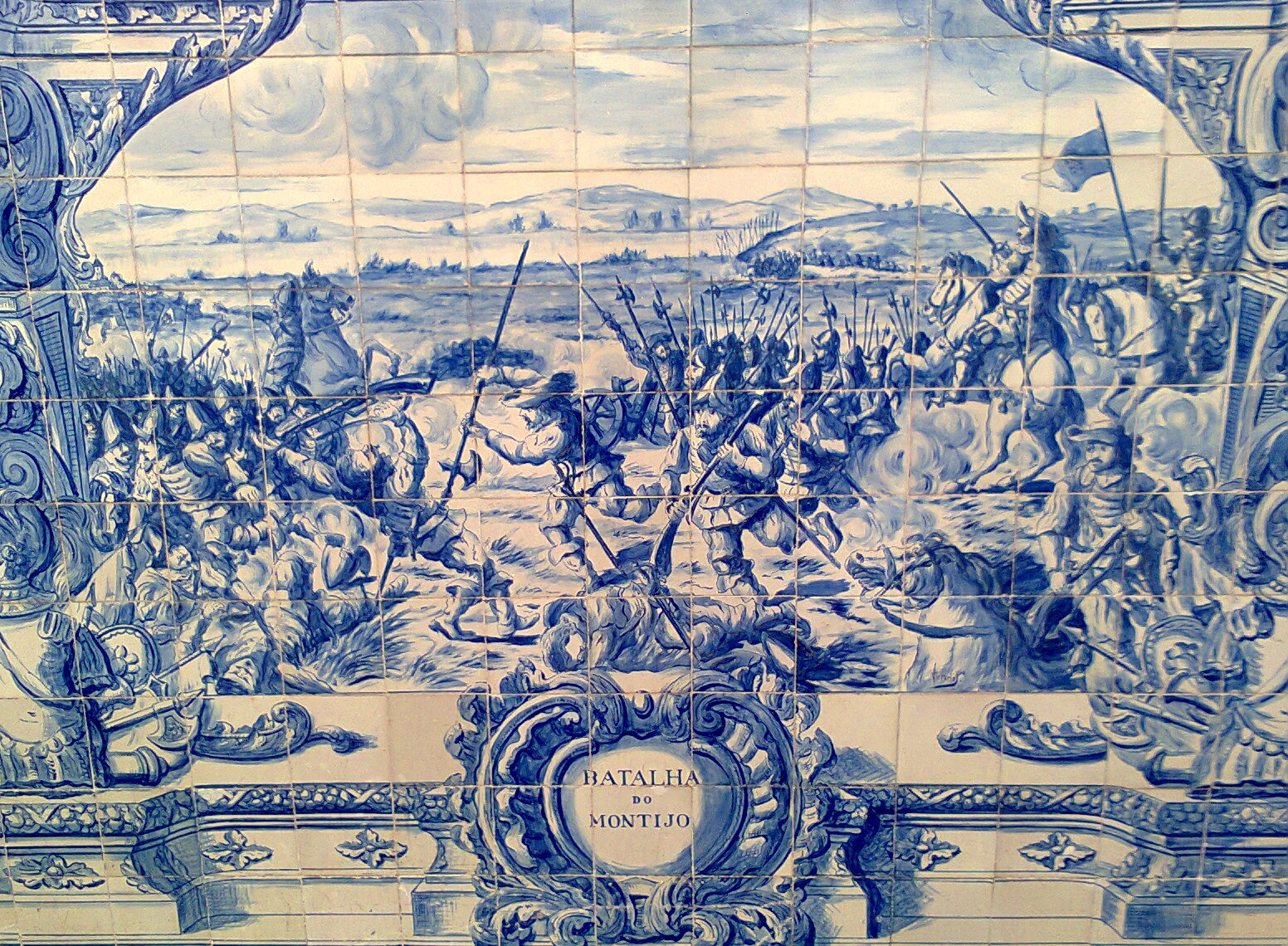
- The Battle of Montijo (Military Museum of Lisbon)
Date	26 May 1644
Location	Near Montijo, Spain 38.89°N 6.60°W
Result	Inconclusive

Belligerents
Portugal	Spain

Commanders and leaders
(Portugal) Matias de Albuquerque	(Spain) Ghislain de Bryas (Spain) Carlo Andrea Caracciolo

Strength
6,000 infantry and 1,100 cavalry (6 guns)	4,000 infantry and 1,700 cavalry (2 guns)

Casualties and losses
3,000 dead and wounded (disputed) or about 900 dead and captured	3,000 dead and wounded (disputed) (Note: "... attempts to reconquer Portugal culminated in a counterattack by Portuguese General Mathias d'Albuquerque into Spain with French and English aid and his defeat of the Spanish at Montijo near Badajoz on 26 May 1644. Of 8,000 infantry and 2,500 cavalry engaged the Spanish lost 3,000 killed and wounded". (Clodfelter, p. 43.) or 433 dead and 380 wounded

The Battle of Montijo was fought on 26 May 1644, in Montijo, Spain, between Portuguese and Spanish forces. Although the battle ended with a tactical Portuguese victory, the Spanish saw it as a strategic success as they claimed to have prevented Matias de Albuquerque from capturing Badajoz, despite Albuquerque having no intention of attacking that city. Due to the chaotic nature of the battle, its outcome is debated and casualty figures vary.

== Background ==
Portuguese General Matias de Albuquerque knew the Spanish were commanded by the Carlo Andrea Caracciolo, marquis of Torrecuso, a renowned military tactician, and wanted to affirm his own presence. He managed to gather 6,000 infantry, 1,100 cavalry and six cannons, in order to give battle. He crossed the frontier attacking, pillaging and burning Vilar del Rey, Puebla and Boca de Manfarete until reaching the town of Montijo, which surrendered without a fight.

== Battle ==
Not having encountered the Spanish army, Matias de Albuquerque decided to return to Alentejo. While on the march, the Portuguese were confronted by a Spanish force from Torrecuso's army, led by the Baron of Molinghem consisting of 4,000 infantry and 1,700 cavalry. On 26 May 1644 the two armies met not far from Montijo.

The forces of Molinghem adopted a semi-circle formation, which would permit a simultaneous attack on the Portuguese front and flanks. Matias de Albuquerque, marching in a slow pace towards Portugal, had prepared for a rear attack by placing the infantry in two defensive lines with the strongest formations in the rear, the baggage wagons in the vanguard and the cavalry split between the two flanks.

The six cannons of the Portuguese initiated the hostilities, the Spanish side soon replied, but very ineffectively. The Spanish cavalry attacked the Portuguese left flank, routing the 150 Dutch cavalry commanded by Captain Piper. The panic spread to the rest of the cavalry on both flanks who abandoned the field through their own lines, taking refuge in woods near Xévora, leaving the infantry disorganized. Led by Molinghem himself, the Spanish cavalry easily opened a breach in the centre of the Portuguese positions, taking the Portuguese artillery. Thinking that the battle was won, Molinghem's troops scattered themselves without care on the field looting. Albuquerque's horse was killed and he was found fighting on foot by a French officer named Lamorlé (fighting for the Portuguese) who gave him his own horse.

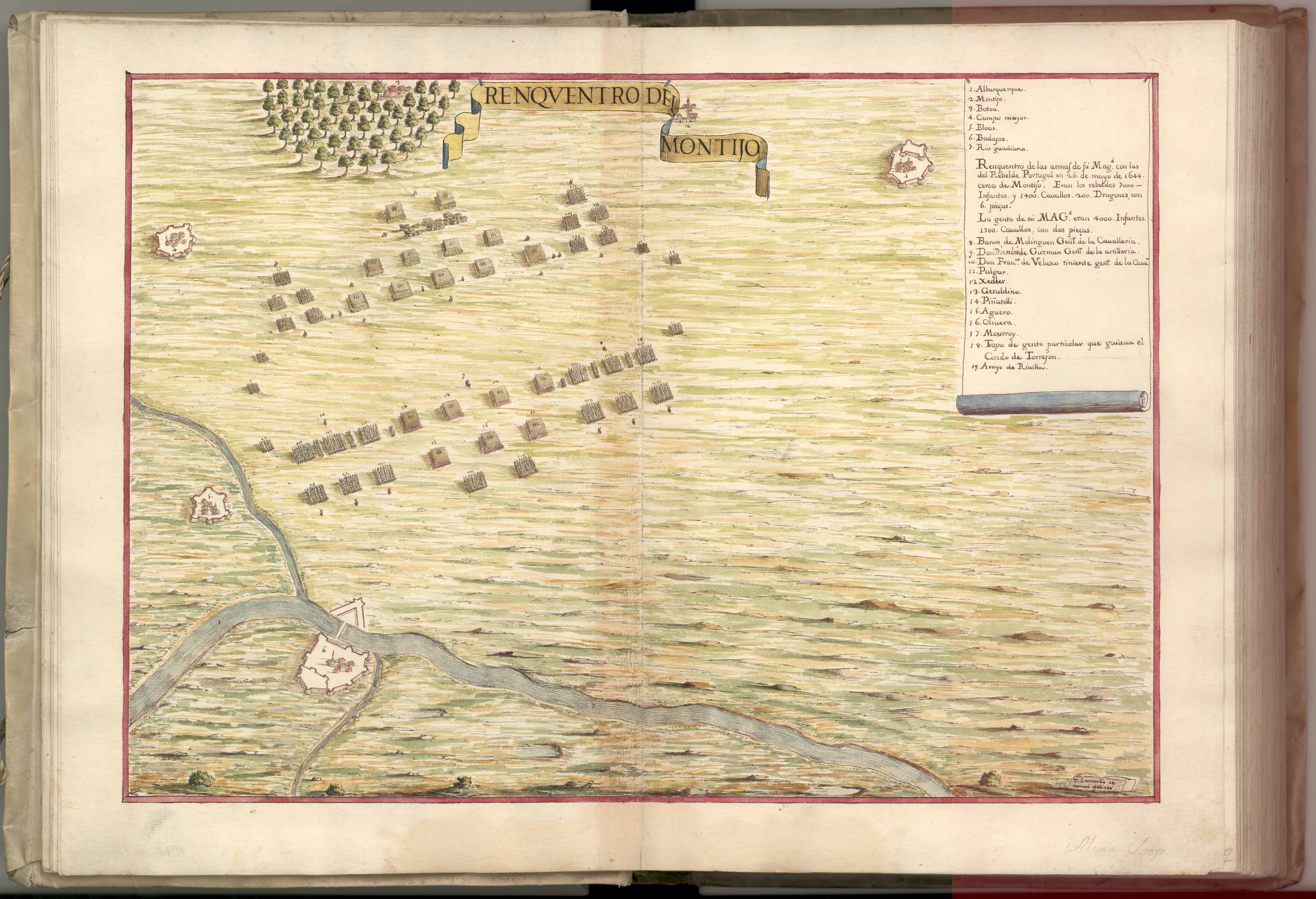
The Battle of Montijo in a Spanish map dated 1655

Taking advantage of the Spanish lack of reserves and dispersion, Albuquerque and his officers rallied some of the scattered troops and retook the Portuguese artillery. D. João da Costa, a Portuguese artillery officer, efficiently used the artillery to stop the Spanish forces from regrouping. The rallied Portuguese troops took back the field, and drove the Spaniards across the Guadiana inflicting heavy losses. (Note: "... and in accord with the general commanding the artillery, D. João da Costa, cast themselves upon the Spaniards, who had become dispersed as though they had buried the enemy; and, driving all before them, without giving them time to recover themselves, compel them to cross the Guadiana" (McMurdo, p. 392.)) (Note: "Albuquerque rallied his men and drove the Spanish troops across the Guadiana with heavy losses". (Livermore, p. 179.)) (Note: "... Matias de Albuquerque rallied part of his troops, took advantage of the slackening of the enemy, recovered the cannon and drove the Spaniards back over the Guadiana river, with a loss, according to Ericeira, of over three thousand". (History of Portugal, p. 292.))

== Aftermath ==
Both sides claimed victory. Madrid, as well as Lisbon (Note: "The victory, due to the enterprise of Matias de Albuquerque caused great rejoicing in Lisbon". History of Portugal, p. 292.) rejoiced with news of the battle that had great repercussion in the European courts, which quickly acknowledged Portugal's divorce with the union.

While there were writers and historians who referred to the Spaniards having been "defeated", (Note: "... The founder of the Braganza dynasty, he expelled a Spanish usurper and proclaimed himself King in 1640. He defeated the Spanish at Montijo in 1644". (Wright, p. 335.)) (Note: "Finally, in 1644, a Portuguese army under Gen. Mathias d'Albuquerque invaded western Spain. On May 26 Albuquerque's troops met and defeated a Spanish army of Philip IV at Montijo". (Eggenberger, p. 285.)) (Note: "John IV duke of Braganza, made King during an insurrection against the Spaniards ruled vigorously; defeated the Spaniards at Montijo, 26 May 1644". (Vincent, p. 301.)) "entirely defeated" (Note: "The first battle was fought at Montijo in 1644, between a Portuguese army of 6000 foot and 1100 horse, and a Spanish army of nearly the same number. The latter were entirely defeated, and this contributed greatly to establish the affairs of Portugal on a firm basis". (Encyclopædia Britannica, p. 386.)) or "routed" (Note: "At Montijo, west of Badajoz, Albuquerque routed a Spanish army. War continued intermittently for another 20 years before Philip finally recognized Portuguese independence". (Jaques, p. 340.)) and talked about varying degrees of victory for the Portuguese troops, (Note: "... in 1644 the Portuguese won the victory of Montijo and thereafter held the Castilians on the defensive". (Livermore, p. 303.)) (Note: "Many skirmishes took place in Beira and Tras-os-Montes but bore no results as far as concerned the greater consolidation of the restoration. The greatest and most signal victory gained by the Portuguese was the battle of Montijo on the 26th of May, 1644". (McMurdo, p. 391.)) including a "major victory", (Note: "Portugal won battles at Olivenca and Beira in 1642, then invaded Spain in May 1644 under General Mathias d'Albuquerque, and won a major victory at the Battle of Montijo". (Sandler, p. 835.)) and even "an easy victory", (Note: "Four years after regaining independence from Spain, Portugal invaded western Spain in retaliation for continuing Spanish plots against the Portuguese monarchy. With Spain still bogged down in the Eighty Years' War with the Netherlands and another long war with France, the Portuguese won an easy victory that secured them from further interference for a dozen years, though it did not bring formal peace". (Nolan, p. 607.)) others exercised more caution when reviewing the result. (Note: "Although the Portuguese had always minimised their losses, and claimed a victory, in reality casualties were very high and, if indeed they had won the day, why did they subsequently stop their offensive and retreat to Portugal?". (Mesa, p. 209.))

Equally elated were Spanish writers and historians when referring to the Spanish victory, and the Portuguese being "routed".

On the following day the Portuguese troops returned to Campo Maior. When news of Albuquerque's victory reached King John IV of Portugal, he awarded the general with the title of Count of Alegrete.

== In culture ==
The Spanish playwrights Pedro Francisco de Lanini and Agustín Durán composed respectively the comedy El más valiente Extremeño, Bernardo del Montijo, el segundo Don Rodrigo Díaz de Vivar and the poem in the collection Romances vulgares de valentías, guapezas y desafueros in honor of the battle, and the Portuguese poet João Soares da Gama celebrated a Portuguese victory in his Batalha do Montijo.

== Bibliography ==
- Afonso dos Santos, Carlos; Carlos Selvagem (1931). Portugal militar. Imprensa Nacional
- Ames, Glenn Joseph (2000). Renascent empire?: the House of Braganza and the quest for stability in Portuguese monsoon Asia c. 1640–1683. Amsterdam University Press. ISBN 90-5356-382-2
- Artola, Miguel (2007). Enciclopedia de Historia de España: Diccionario temático. Alianza Ed. ISBN 978-84-206-5241-2
- Clodfelter, Micheal (2002). Warfare and armed conflicts: a statistical reference to casualty and other figures, 1500–2000. McFarland. ISBN 978-0-7864-1204-4
- Contreras y López de Ayala Lozoya, Juan (marqués de) (1968). Historia de España: La "Edad Antigua" Americana a la política exterior de Felipe IV. Salvat Editores.
- CUP Archive (197?). History of Portugal: pamphlet collection. ISBN 1-00-128780-0
- Disney, A. R. (2009). A History of Portugal and the Portuguese Empire: From Beginnings to 1807, Volume 1. Cambridge University Press; 1st edition ISBN 0-521-60397-8
- Eggenberger, David (1985). An encyclopedia of Battles: accounts of over 1,560 battles from 1479 B.C. to the present. ISBN 0-486-24913-1
- Encyclopædia Britannica, or Dictionary of Arts, Sciences, and General Literature: Pla – Rei, Volume 18 (The) (1859).
- García Hernán, Enrique; Davide Maffi (2006). Guerra y Sociedad en la Monarquía Hispánica: política, estrategia y cultura en la Europa Moderna, 1500–1700, Volume 1. Laberinto. ISBN 978-84-8483-224-9
- Ibarra y Rodríguez, Eduardo (1979). España Bajo los Austrias. Editorial Labor. ISBN 978-84-335-2206-1
- Jaques, Tony (2007). Dictionary of Battles and Sieges: F-O. Greenwood Publishing Group. ISBN 0-313-33538-9
- Livermore, H. V. (1976). A new History of Portugal. Cambridge University Press Archive. ISBN 0-521-29103-8
- McMurdo, Edward (2010). The History of Portugal – From the Reign of D. Joao II to the Reign of D. Joao V, Volume III.
- Menezes Ericeira, Luis de (conde da) (1751). Historia de Portugal restaurado: 1643–1656.
- Mesa, Eduardo de (2014). The Irish in the Spanish Armies in the Seventeenth Century, p. 209. ISBN 9781843839514 Google Books
- Nolan, Cathal J. (2006). The Age of Wars of Religion, 1000–1650: an encyclopedia of global warfare and civilization. ISBN 0-313-33733-0
- Ribeiro, Ângelo (2004). História de Portugal: A Restauração da Independência-O Início da Dinastia de Bragança. ISBN 989-554-110-4
- Sandler, Stanley (2007). Ground warfare: an international encyclopedia, Volume 1. ABC-CLIO. ISBN 1-57607-344-0
- Townsend, George Henry (1862). The manual of dates: a dictionary of reference to all the most important events in the history of mankind to be found in authentic records. Routledge, Warne, & Routledge.
- Ventura i Subirats, Jordi (1976). Historia de España: Desde los Reyes Católicos hasta Carlos, Volume 3. Plaza y Janés. ISBN 978-84-01-60543-7
- Vincent, Benjamin (2008). A Dictionary of Biography – Past and Present – Containing the Chief Events in the Lives of Eminent Persons of all Ages and Nations. Preceded by the Biographies and Genealogies of the Chief Representatives of the Royal Houses of the World. Read Books. ISBN 978-1-4437-3455-4
- Virginia Military Institute, George C. Marshall Foundation, American Military Institute (2007). The Journal of Military History, Volume 71, Issues 1–2. American Military Institute
- Wagner-Pacifici, Robin Erica (2005). The art of surrender: decomposing sovereignty at conflict's end. University of Chicago Press. ISBN 978-0-226-86979-7
- Wright, Edmund (2006). A Dictionary of World History. Oxford University Press. ISBN 0-19-920247-8
