= Carlo Andrea Caracciolo =

Italian nobleman and military commander (1583-1646)

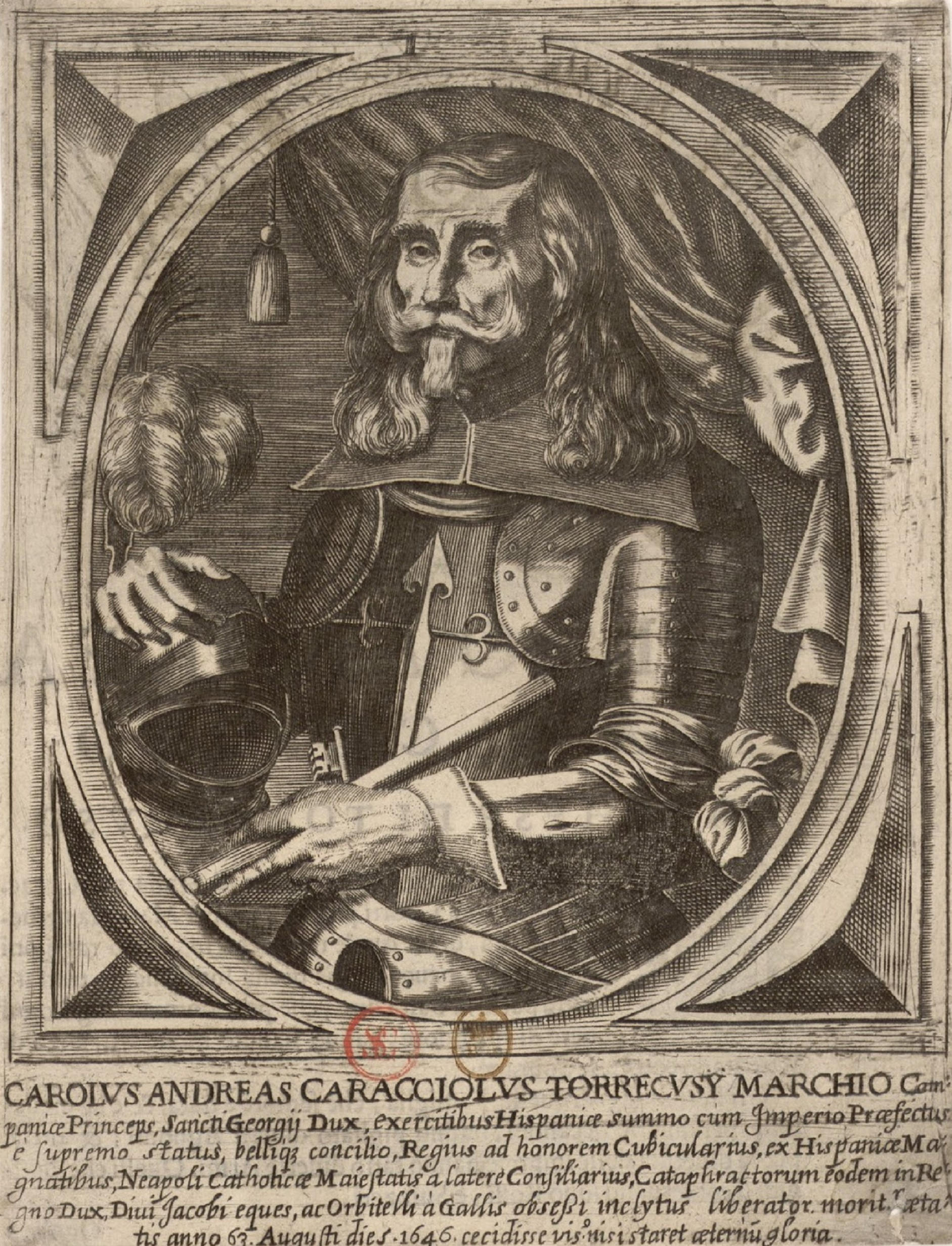
Engraving of Caracciolo with posthumous Latin caption

Carlo Andrea Caracciolo (1583/4 – 5 August 1646) was an Italian nobleman and military commander serving the Spanish Empire.

A member of the House of Caracciolo of the Kingdom of Naples, his military career coincided with the Thirty Years' War. He fought in Italy, Germany, Iberia and Brazil against the English, French, Swedes, Catalans and Portuguese. He was the second Marquis of Torrecuso from 1603 and the first Duke of San Giorgio La Molara briefly in 1626.

== Early life ==
Carlo Andrea was born in 1583 or 1584. He was the eldest of seven children of Lelio Caracciolo and Silvia di Traiano Caracciolo. His grandfather was Galeazzo Caracciolo, the famed convert to Calvinism. Lelio fought in the Battle of Lepanto in 1571. His title was changed from Marquis of Libonati to Marquis of Torrecuso shortly before his death in 1603. Carlo inherited Torrecuso and the new title, but soon sold Libonati.

In 1611, Caracciolo joined the expedition of the Marquis of Santa Cruz to the Kerkennah Islands, where he was wounded in action. In 1614, he married Teresa Vittoria Ravaschieri. Their first son, Carlo Maria, was born in Naples in 1616. Teresa died in 1637.

== Military career ==
Caracciolo returned to military service in 1621, when he raised a tercio in Naples for service in Spain. A marine unit, it was amalgamated with the Tercio napolitano de la Real Armada in 1624 under Caracciolo's command. In 1625, he participated in the recapture of Bahia in Brazil and in the defence of Cádiz against the English. For these actions, he was inducted into the Order of Santiago in October 1625. In 1626, his fief at San Giorgio La Molara was raised to a duchy, which he ceded later that year to Carlo Maria.

In 1627, Caracciolo took part in the siege of La Rochelle. In 1629, he was in Cádiz to defend the fleet from a possible English attack. In 1631, he surrendered command of the Tercio napolitano and raised a new tercio in Italy. In the autumn of 1633, having marched from Milan over the Alps, his forces campaigned against the Swedes in southern Germany, taking part in the relief of Constance and Breisach and the capture of Waldshut, Säckingen, Laufenburg and Rheinfelden. In 1634, they fought in the Battle of Nördlingen. They then took the Spanish Road to join the Army of Flanders. The tercio was finally disbanded in Flanders in April 1635. Caracciolo then joined the Army of Alsace as a captain of artillery and took part in the relief of Valenza, receiving a personal commendation from the Count-Duke of Olivares.

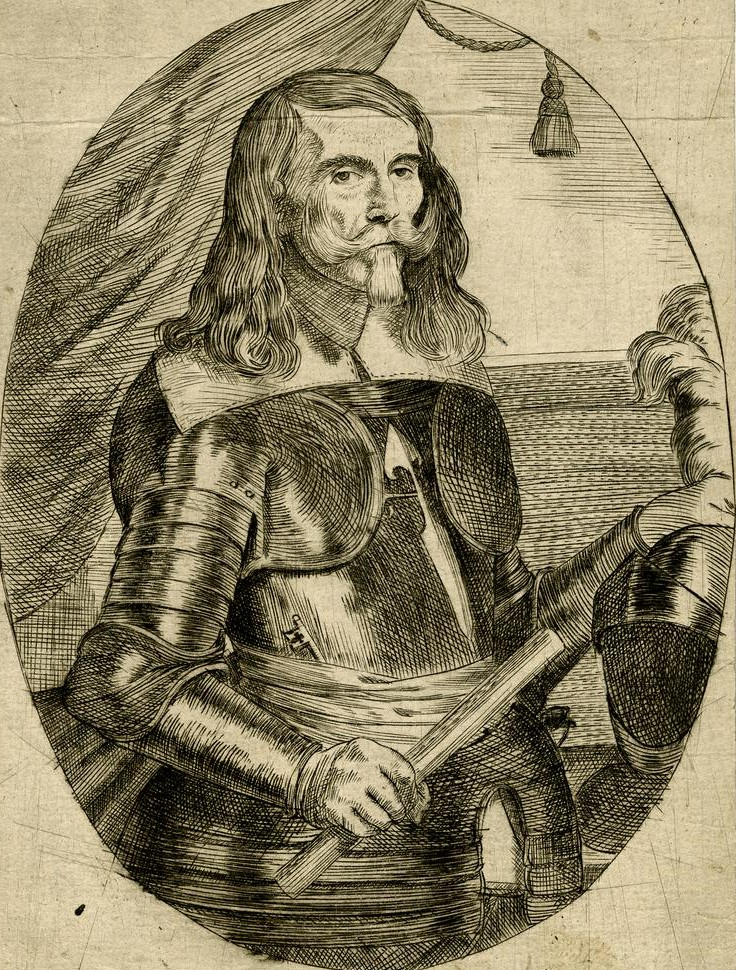
Engraving of Caracciolo by Nicola Marotta

In 1637, Caracciolo was the commander of the infantry of the County of Burgundy with the rank of governor of arms. Summoned the Spanish court, he was appointed maestre de campo general of Navarre. In 1638, he took part in relieving the French siege of Fuenterrabía. In 1639–1640, he campaigned in Roussillon and was at the recapture of Salses. Recalled to help suppress the Catalan revolt, he was present at the Battle of Montjuïc in 1641, where his eldest son was killed.

Following his son's death, Caracciolo received permission to return to Naples. He remained in Catalonia, however, because of the siege of Tarragona. In 1642, he revictualed besieged Perpignan in a daring raid, for which he was rewarded with the rank of Grandee of Spain. Only then did he return to Naples, only to be recalled in 1643 to command the army of Extremadura against a Portuguese invasion. His subordinate, Ghislain de Bryas, fought an indecisive encounter at Montijo. Responding to criticism at court, he crossed the frontier and laid siege to Elvas. After being forced to lift the siege, his resignation was accepted by King Philip IV in February 1645.

Caracciolo was recalled from retirement in 1646 to defend the Tuscan Presidi against the French. He asked that his salary be distributed among the troops. Embarking with reinforcements at Naples on 5 July, he took command of the entire army at Porto Ercole. In the Battle of Orbetello, he forced the French to raise their siege. By 20 July, he had liberated the Presidi. He was back in Naples on 28 July, but had contracted a fever. He died on 5 August. He was succeeded as Marquis of Torrecuso by his second son, Girolamo Maria, who had already succeeded his brother as Duke of San Giorgio in 1641.

== Bibliography ==
- Benzoni, Gino (1976). "Caracciolo, Carlo Andrea". Dizionario Biografico degli Italiani (in Italian). Vol. 19: Cappi–Cardona. Rome: Istituto dell'Enciclopedia Italiana. ISBN 978-88-12-00032-6.
- Sánchez Martín, Juan Luis (2018). "Caracciolo, Carlo Andrea". Diccionario Biográfico Español. Real Academia de la Historia.
