= Felipe da Silva =

Portuguese soldier

D. Felipe da Silva (Portugal, 1589 – Zaragoza, 1645) was a Portuguese soldier in the service of Spain. He was also Gentleman of the Bedchamber, State Councilor and Viceroy of Catalonia during the reign of Philip IV of Spain.

== Biography ==
Felipe da Silva was the son of Dona Filipa da Silva (1550–1590), 4th Countess of Portalegre and of Don Juan de Silva (1528-1601), Spanish ambassador to the court of King Sebastian and Count of Salinas. His brother was D. Manrique da Silva, 1st Marquis of Gouveia, mordomo-mor of King John IV of Portugal and member of his privy council.

In 1630, da Silva was part of the War Council of Flanders, along with the Marquis of Mirabel and the Marquis of Cerralvo, Manuel Pimentel de Requesens Count of Feira, Claude de Rye, Baron of Valançon and Anthonie Schetz, Baron of Grobbendonk.

In 1638, as Governor of Antwerp, he was faced by a Dutch attack, which was repelled in the Battle of Kallo.

After the Portuguese revolution of 1 December 1640, he was held in custody at Burgos, being freed in 1643 after which he was ordered to proceed to Madrid where he was promoted to commander of the Spanish forces in Catalonia, and made Viceroy of Catalonia on 10 March 1643.

He led the conquest of Monzon (Montsó) in 1643 and of Lérida (Lleida) in 1644. He died in that same year or in 1645, without issue.

== Bibliography ==
- Campaña de Cataluña de 1644, Colección de documentos Inéditos para la Historia de España, Tom 95 - Madrid, 1890
