= Girolamo Maria Caracciolo =

Gerolamo Maria Caracciolo (Torrecuso, Kingdom of Naples, 20 September 1617 – Los Santos de Maimona, Extremadura, 16 August 1662), 3rd Marquis of Torrecuso, was a Spanish aristocrat and soldier of Italian descent.

== Biography ==
Girolamo Maria was the second son of General Carlo Andrea Caracciolo, 2nd Marquis of Torrecuso, and his wife Teresa Vittoria Ravaschieri Fieschi.

Following the premature death of his elder brother Carlo Maria in the Battle of Montjuïc (1641), Girolamo Maria succeeded his father as 3rd Marquis of Torrecuso and 3rd Duke of San Giorgio in 1646.

During the Neapolitan Revolution of 1647–1648, Caracciolo played a significant role in suppressing the popular uprising and restoring the viceroy's authority.

On 7 September 1660, Girolamo Maria Caracciolo returned to Spain, as "Maestro di campo" of the Italian troops in the Portuguese Restoration War. He participated in the capture of Arronches (17 June 1661), Juromenha (9 June 1662) and Monforte (28 June) under the command of Don Juan José of Austria. He contracted a fever and died in Extremadura, on 16 August 1662, in the house of Juan José de Austria.
