= Battle of Montmeló =

1642 battle

Coordinates: 41.5547°N 2.2500°E

- Part of Reapers' War and the Franco-Spanish War (1635–59)
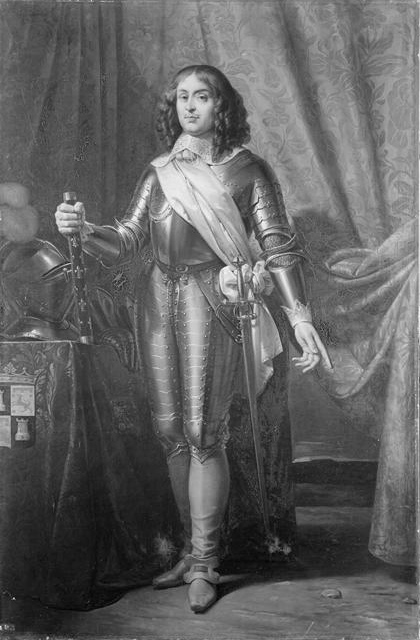
Date	28 March 1642
Location	Montmeló, Principality of Catalonia
Result	Franco-Catalan victory

Belligerents
Kingdom of France; Principality of Catalonia	(Spain) Spanish Empire

Commanders and leaders
(Kingdom of France) Philippe de La Mothe (Principality of Catalonia) Josep Margarit	(Spain) Pedro Antonio de Aragón

Strength
8,000	2,500–4,500

Casualties and losses
unknown	1,000

The Battle of Montmeló took place on 28 March 1642 in Montmeló, Catalonia during the Reapers' War. A Franco-Catalan army under the command of Philippe de La Mothe-Houdancourt fought and defeated a smaller Spanish force under Pedro Antonio de Aragón.

== The Battle ==
In 1640, a rebellion broke out in Catalonia against the Spanish central government. The Spanish army failed to suppress the uprising, also because the French King supported it militarily. The French army invaded Roussillon and occupied it completely, except for Perpignan, which was besieged from November 1641.

By March 1642 the situation in the starving city had become critical, and the Spanish gathered an army of 4,500 men in Tarragona to relieve Perpignan. This column, under command of Pedro Antonio de Aragón, departed on 23 March.

On 26 March, its rearguard was attacked at Esparreguera by the French General de La Mothe. This deviated the Spanish from their path and brought them close to Barcelona. The Catalans saw this as a provocation and immediately mobilized their troops.
On 28 March, the Spanish were intercepted at Montmeló by the Franco-Catalan cavalry and were heavily defeated, suffering a thousand casualties.

The survivors retreated towards Tarragona, being pursued by the troops of Philippe de La Mothe-Houdancourt and finally surrendered on 31 March at the Battle of Granada.
