= Calabar Kingdom =

Calabar Kingdom may refer to:

- Kalabari Kingdom, a city state of the Kalabari People in what is now Rivers State, Nigeria
- Akwa Akpa, a city state of the Efik people based on what is now the city of Calabar
