= Porto Calvo =

Municipality in Alagoas, Brazil

- Municipality of Alagoas, Brazil
- Flag
- Etymology: In English "Bald Port", referring to a legend of a bald man who built a port
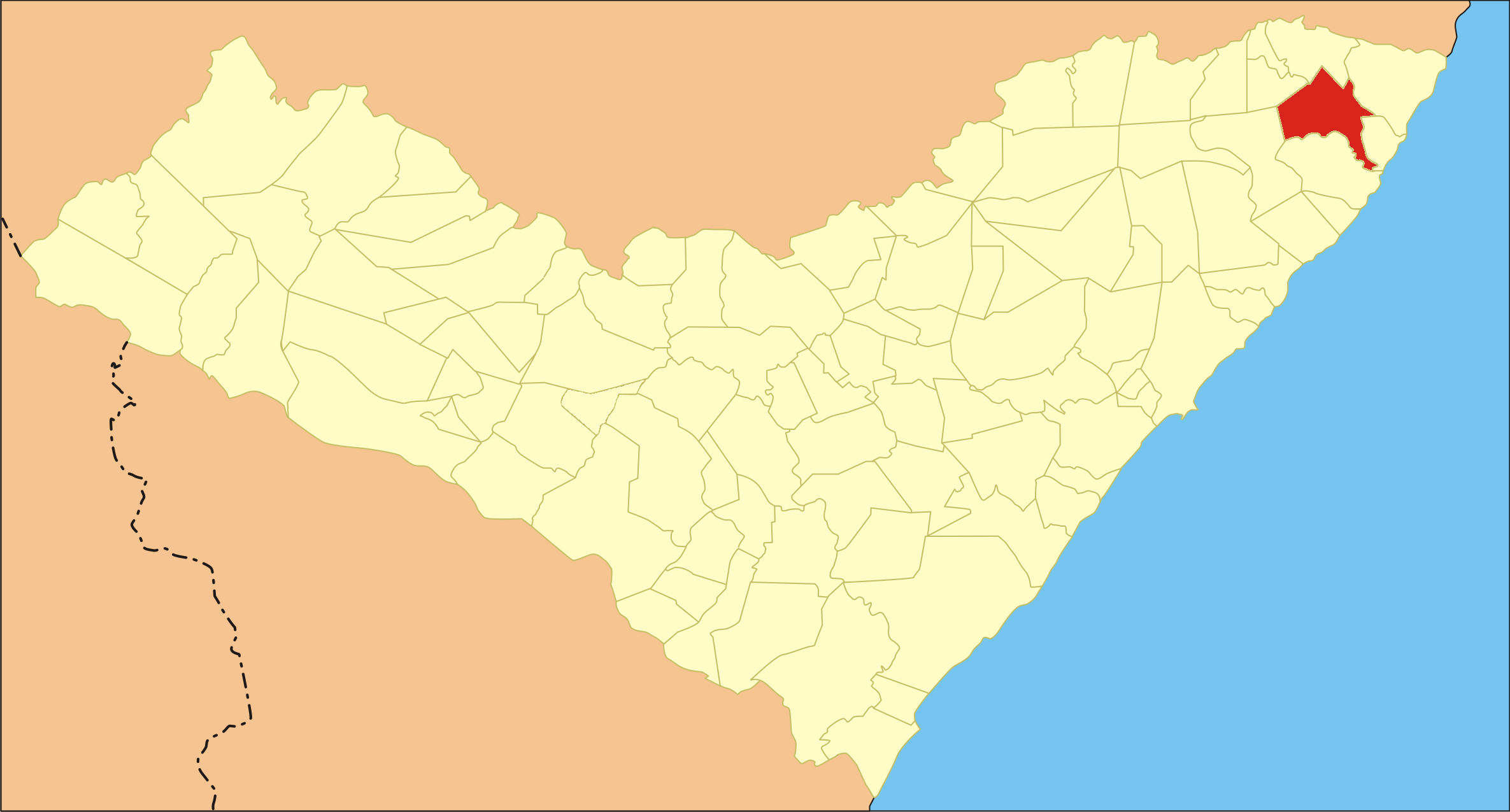
- Location of Porto Calvo in Alagoas

- Location within Brazil Location within South America
- Coordinates: 9°2′59″S 35°23′52″W
- Country: Brazil
- Region: Northeast
- State: Alagoas
- Founded: 14 November 1889

Government
  - Mayor: Eronita Sposito Leao e Lima (MDB) (2025-2028)
  - Vice Mayor: Vínicius Leao e Lima Carvalho (PSB) (2025-2028)

Area
  - Total: 313.231 km^{2} (120.939 sq mi)
- Elevation: 35 m (115 ft)

Population (2025)
  - Total: 24,509
  - Density: 76.85/km^{2} (199.0/sq mi)
  - Town/Settlement: 20,470
- Demonym: Porto-calvense (Brazilian Portuguese)
- Time zone: UTC-03:00 (Brasília Time)
- Postal code: 57900-000
- HDI (2010): 0.586 – medium
- Website: portocalvo.al.gov.br

Porto Calvo (Central northeastern portuguese pronunciation: [ˈpoʁtu ˈkawvu]) is a municipality in the state of Alagoas, Brazil. Its population was 24,071 in 2022 and its area is 313 km^{2} (121 sq mi). It was founded in 1636.

== See also ==
- List of municipalities in Alagoas
