= Château Royal de Collioure =

17th century fortress in Colliure, Occitania, France

Coordinates: 42°31′32.0″N 3°5′4.5″E

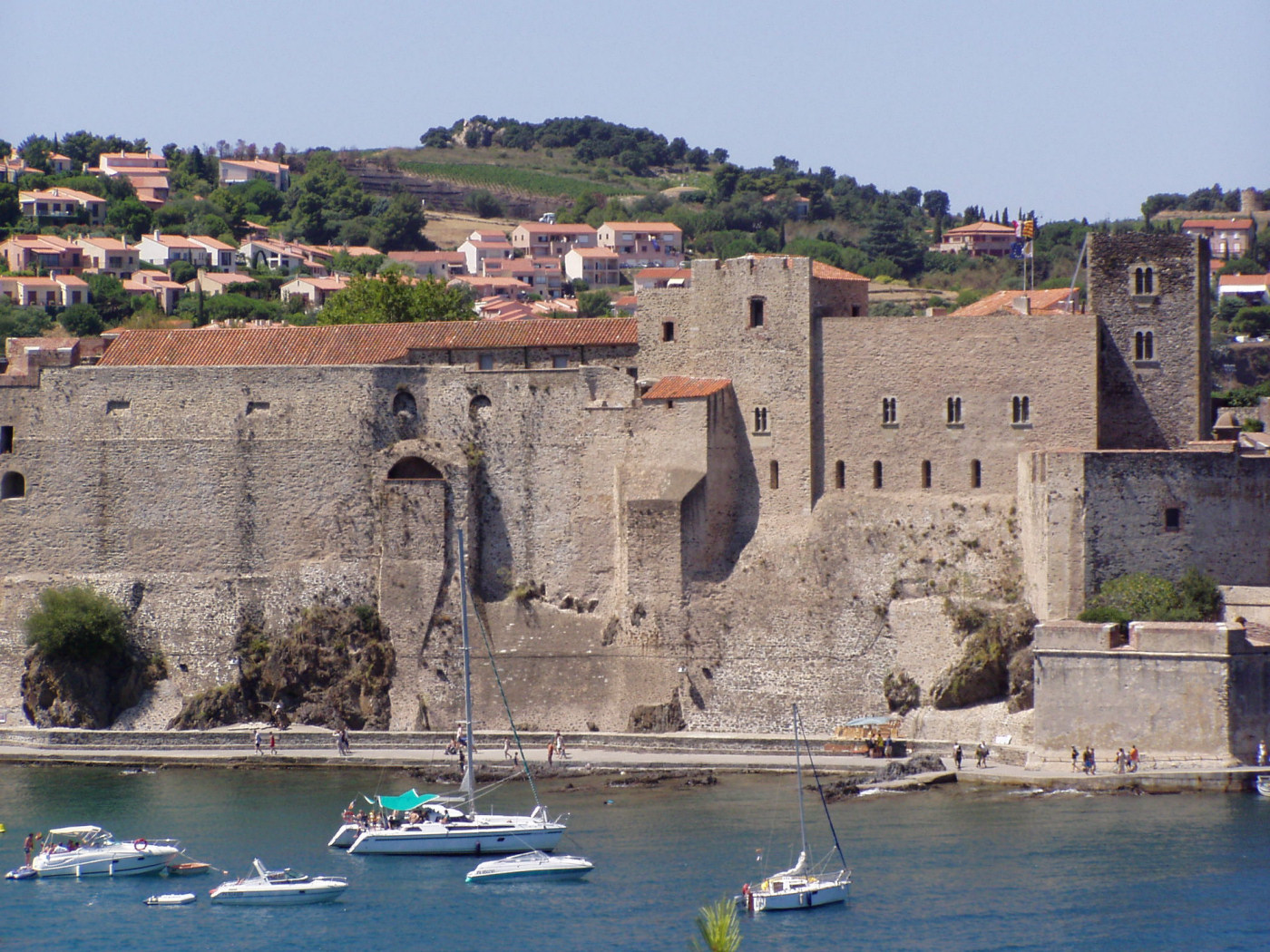
Château Royal de Collioure

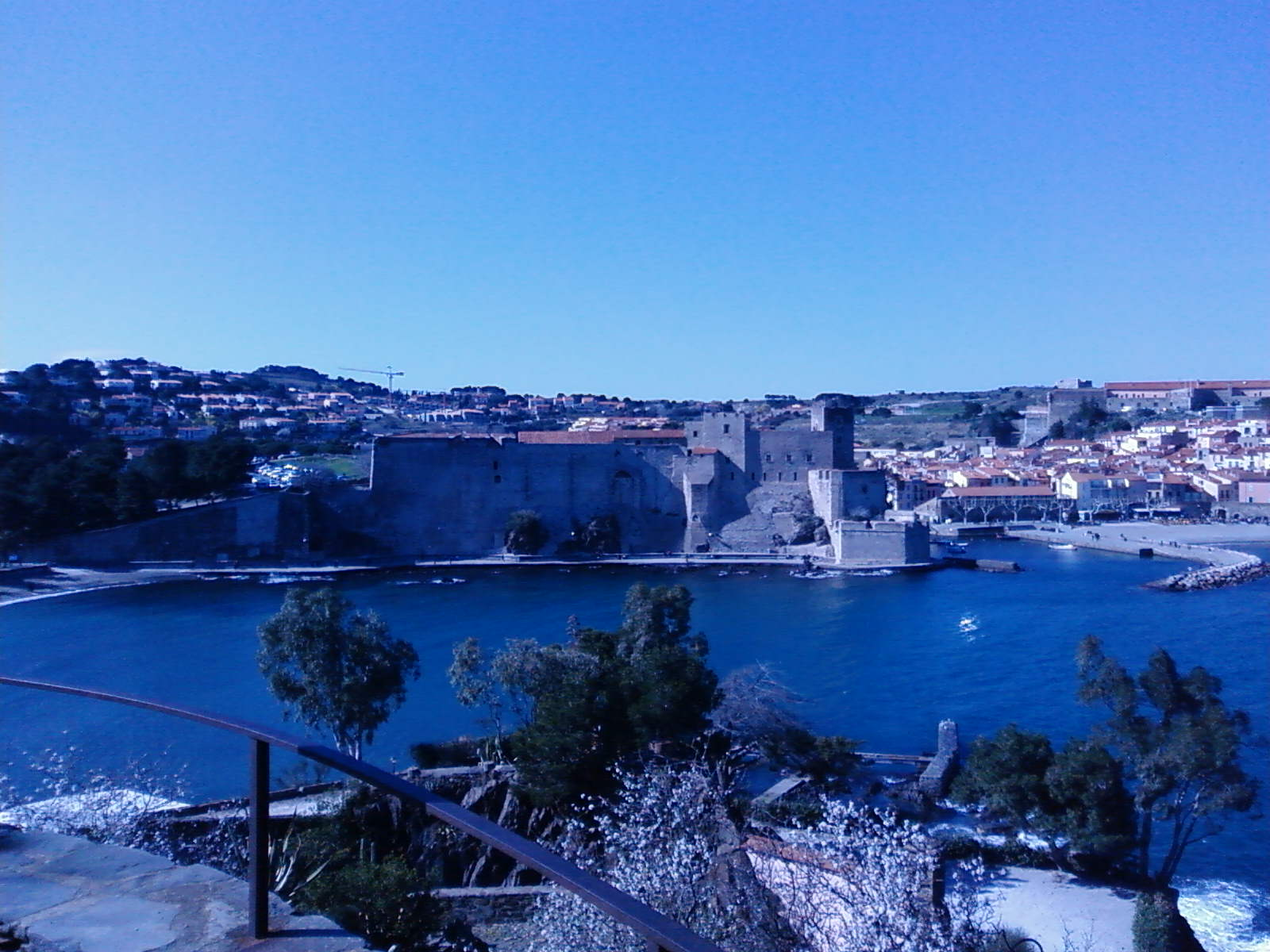
Château Royal de Collioure

The Château Royal de Collioure (Catalan: Castell Reial de Cotlliure) is a massive French beach fortified royal castle in the town of Collioure, a few kilometers north of the Spanish border in the French département of Pyrénées-Orientales.

== History ==
The Château is the juxtaposition of at least four castles.

Roussillon was conquered by the Romans around 120 BC and then occupied by the Visigoths from 418. The first mention is about a fortified site in Collioure under siege in 673, by Wamba, king of the Visigoths who lay siege to the "Castellum Caucolibéri" to subdue a rebellion.

=== Castle of the Templars ===
In the 12th century, Girard II, the last independent count of the Roussillon, bequeathed his land to Alfons II, King of Aragon and Count of Barcelona. Concerned about the prosperity of Collioure, the kings of Aragon granted privileges and tax exemptions. An annual fair was established, and important works were undertaken in the castle, the port and the town. The Knights Templar built the castle around 1207. In 1276, it was integrated into the royal castle.

=== Kings of Majorca ===
A second castle was later built by the Kings of Majorca during the 13th and 14th centuries. In the 13th century, the Castle was annexed to the Kingdom of Majorca, which included the domain of Montpellier, the earldoms of the Roussillon and Cerdanya, the Conflent and Vallespir, and the Balearic Islands. The Kings of Majorca were itinerant. They travelled with their court, moving frequently from Maguelonne, near Montpellier, to Perpignan, to Palma de Majorca or to Collioure.

=== Habsburg fortress: Charles Quint and Philip II ===
In the 16th century, after a brief occupation by Louis XI, the Spanish Habsburgs, starting with Charles Quint, again occupied Collioure. He and his son Philip II turned the castle into a modern fortress of the 16th century. It was imperative that the fortifications were adapted in line with the advances in artillery, and so the castle defences and its surroundings were considerably reinforced.

=== Bourbon citadel ===
In the 17th century, Collioure was at stake in the wars between the Spanish Habsburgs and the French Bourbons. In 1642, Louis XIII's troops lay siege to Collioure and the Château Royal. Ten thousand men including Turenne, d'Artagnan and the King's musketeers occupied the hills overlooking the town, while the French fleet blocked the port. Deprived of water due to the destruction of their wells, the Spanish were forced to surrender. In 1659, France annexed the Roussillon and Collioure and the castle passed definitively into French hands. Vauban built the bastions, reinforced the structure and upgraded Fort Saint-Elme.

=== The Roussillon war ===
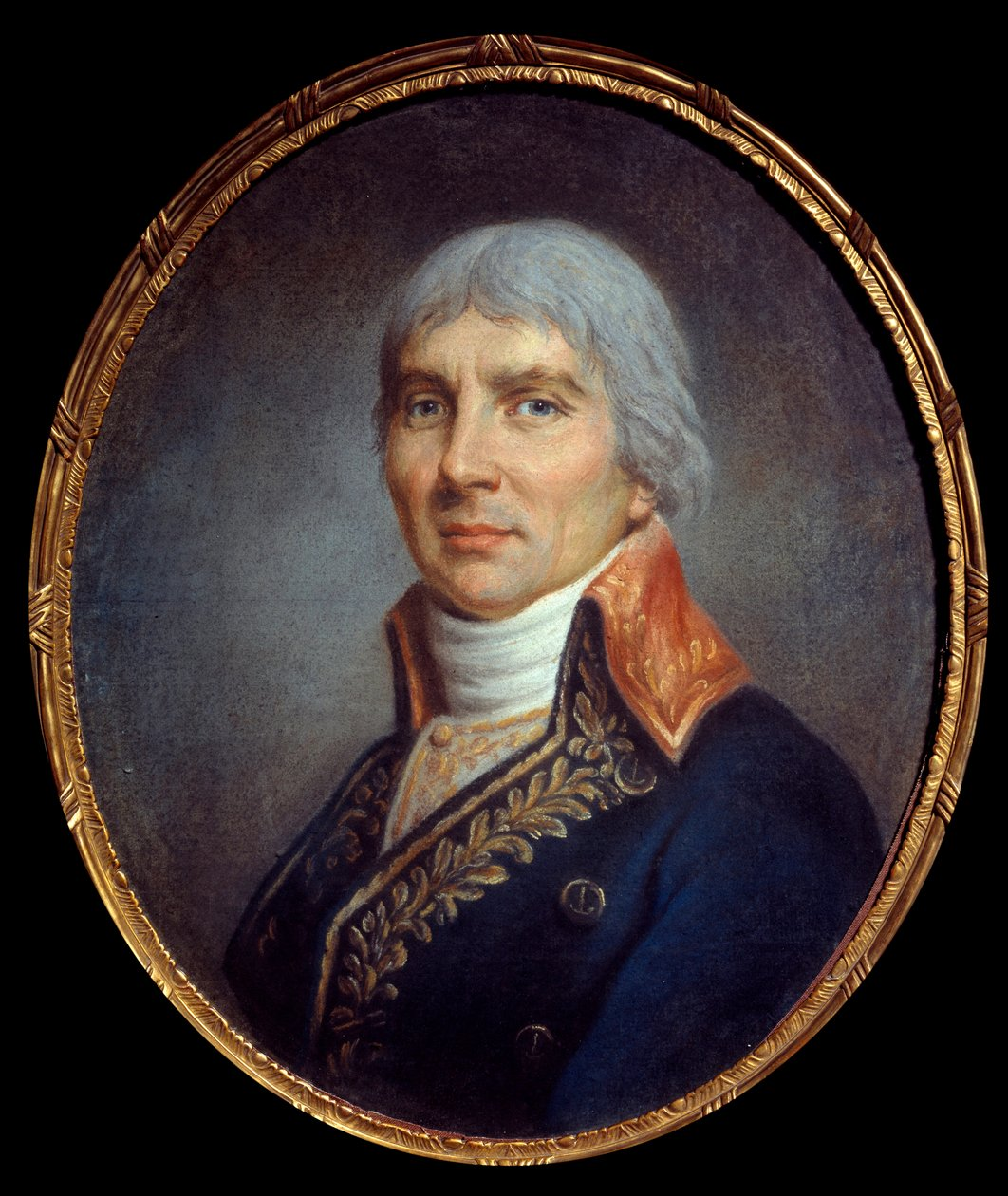
Jacques François Dugommier

In 1793, the Spanish again besieged and occupied Collioure, which General Dugommier took back the next year. He captured Fort Saint-Elme on 25 May and forced the Spanish general Eugenio Navarro to surrender the next day.

=== 20th century ===
- Fort Saint-Elme was sold at auction in August 1913.
- The castle was designated an historic monument in 1922.

The castle was turned into a men's prison in March 1939 and became the first disciplinary camp for the Spanish refugees of the Retirada, the exile from the Spanish Civil War. Many others were sent to the camps of Argelès-sur-Mer and Rivesaltes. After 1941, French detainees were prisoners of the Vichy regime. The prison received men sentenced for indiscipline, attempted escape and incitement to rebellion from the camps of Argelès-sur-Mer, Saint-Cyprien and Le Barcarès. The detainees transited there before being sent to North Africa.

Property of the General Council of the Pyrénées-Orientales since 1951, the castle is one of the major tourist spots in Northern Catalonia.
