= Charles de La Porte, 1st Duke of La Meilleraye =

French nobleman and Marshal of France (1602–1664)

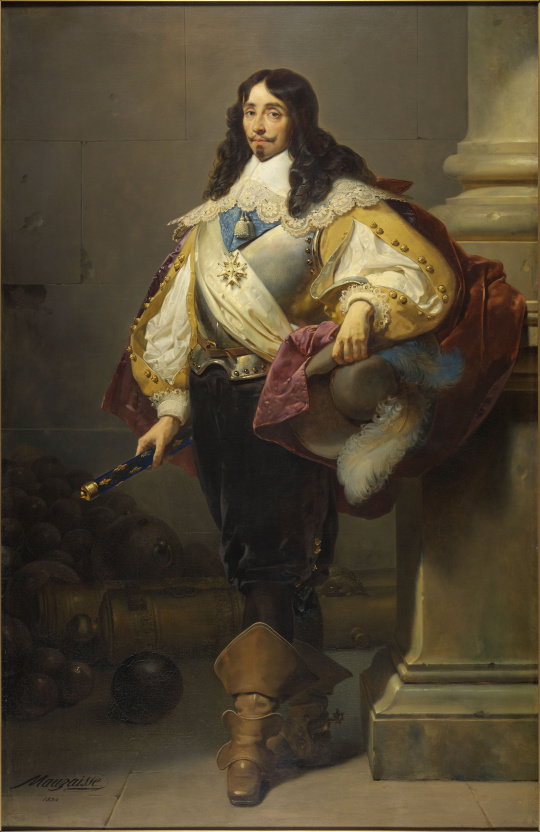
Charles de La Porte, 1st Duke of La Meilleraye

Charles de La Porte, 1st Duke of La Meilleraye (1602 in Paris – 8 February 1664 in Paris) was a French nobleman and a Marshal of France. He was marquis then duke of La Meilleraye and peer of France, baron of Parthenay and of Saint-Maixent, count of Secondigny, seigneur of Le Boisliet, La Lunardière, La Jobelinière and Villeneuve.

== Biography ==
Originally from Poitou, he found himself orphaned at a very young age and, like his first cousin Cardinal Richelieu, he was adopted by their uncle Amador de La Porte, Grand Prior of France, who ensured their education.

Lieutenant General of Brittany in 1632, he was appointed Governor of Nantes, from which he allowed Cardinal de Retz to escape in 1654. He was regularly present on the battlefields. He was appointed Grand Master of Artillery of France the same year, and acquired the reputation of being the best General for sieges; he was nicknamed "the taker of cities".

In 1635, he was promoted to Lieutenant-General. In 1636, Cardinal Richelieu sent him to Port-Louis to make the city's citadel impregnable and said of him :

One of the men of the greatest merit, the most constant favor and the most fulfilled of his time.

In 1639 he became Marshal of France after taking Hesdin. In 1641, he bought the barony of Parthenay.
In 1642, after a ten-month siege, he conquered Perpignan and Salses-le-Château, completing the conquest of Roussillon.

Appointed Superintendent of Finances in 1648, he remained loyal to the King during the troubles of The Fronde.

In 1663, a year before his death, Louis XIV promoted his lands of Parthenay and Gâtine Vendéenne to a Duchy-peerage, under the name of Duchy of La Meilleraye, based on Parthenay and the current commune of Beaulieu-sous-Parthenay (Deux-Sèvres). This immense domain was divided up and the abandoned castle fell into ruins by the end of the 18th century.

The new Duke of La Meilleraye lacked neither skill nor political finesse. Even before the establishment of the French East India Company, he conceived the audacious plan of colonizing Madagascar, then called Dauphine Island, and founded his own maritime trading company.

=== Marriage and children ===
In 1630 he married Marie Coiffié de Ruzé d'Effiat, daughter of Marshal Antoine Coiffier de Ruzé, marquis d'Effiat and sister of the Marquis of Cinq-Mars, with whom he had one son:

- Armand-Charles de la Porte, husband in 1661 of Hortense Mancini, a niece of Mazarin.

Widowed in 1633, he remarried in 1637 Marie de Cossé, daughter of François de Cossé-Brissac, who brought him a dowry of 400,000 livres and the government of Port-Louis. They had no children.

In 1653, he legitimized Charles de Montgogué, the son he had with Catherine Fleury.
