= 1674 =

1674 in various calendars
- Gregorian calendar: 1674; MDCLXXIV
- Ab urbe condita: 2427
- Armenian calendar: 1123; ԹՎ ՌՃԻԳ
- Assyrian calendar: 6424
- Balinese saka calendar: 1595–1596
- Bengali calendar: 1080–1081
- Berber calendar: 2624
- English Regnal year: 25 Cha. 2 – 26 Cha. 2
- Buddhist calendar: 2218
- Burmese calendar: 1036
- Byzantine calendar: 7182–7183
- Chinese calendar: 癸丑年 (Water Ox); 4371 or 4164 — to — 甲寅年 (Wood Tiger); 4372 or 4165
- Coptic calendar: 1390–1391
- Discordian calendar: 2840
- Ethiopian calendar: 1666–1667
- Hebrew calendar: 5434–5435
- Hindu calendars
- Vikram Samvat: 1730–1731
- Shaka Samvat: 1595–1596
- Kali Yuga: 4774–4775
- Holocene calendar: 11674
- Igbo calendar: 674–675
- Iranian calendar: 1052–1053
- Islamic calendar: 1084–1085
- Japanese calendar: Enpō 2 (延宝２年)
- Javanese calendar: 1596–1597
- Julian calendar: Gregorian minus 10 days
- Korean calendar: 4007
- Minguo calendar: 238 before ROC 民前238年
- Nanakshahi calendar: 206
- Thai solar calendar: 2216–2217
- Tibetan calendar: ཆུ་མོ་གླང་ལོ་ (female Water-Ox); 1800 or 1419 or 647 — to — ཤིང་ཕོ་སྟག་ལོ་ (male Wood-Tiger); 1801 or 1420 or 648

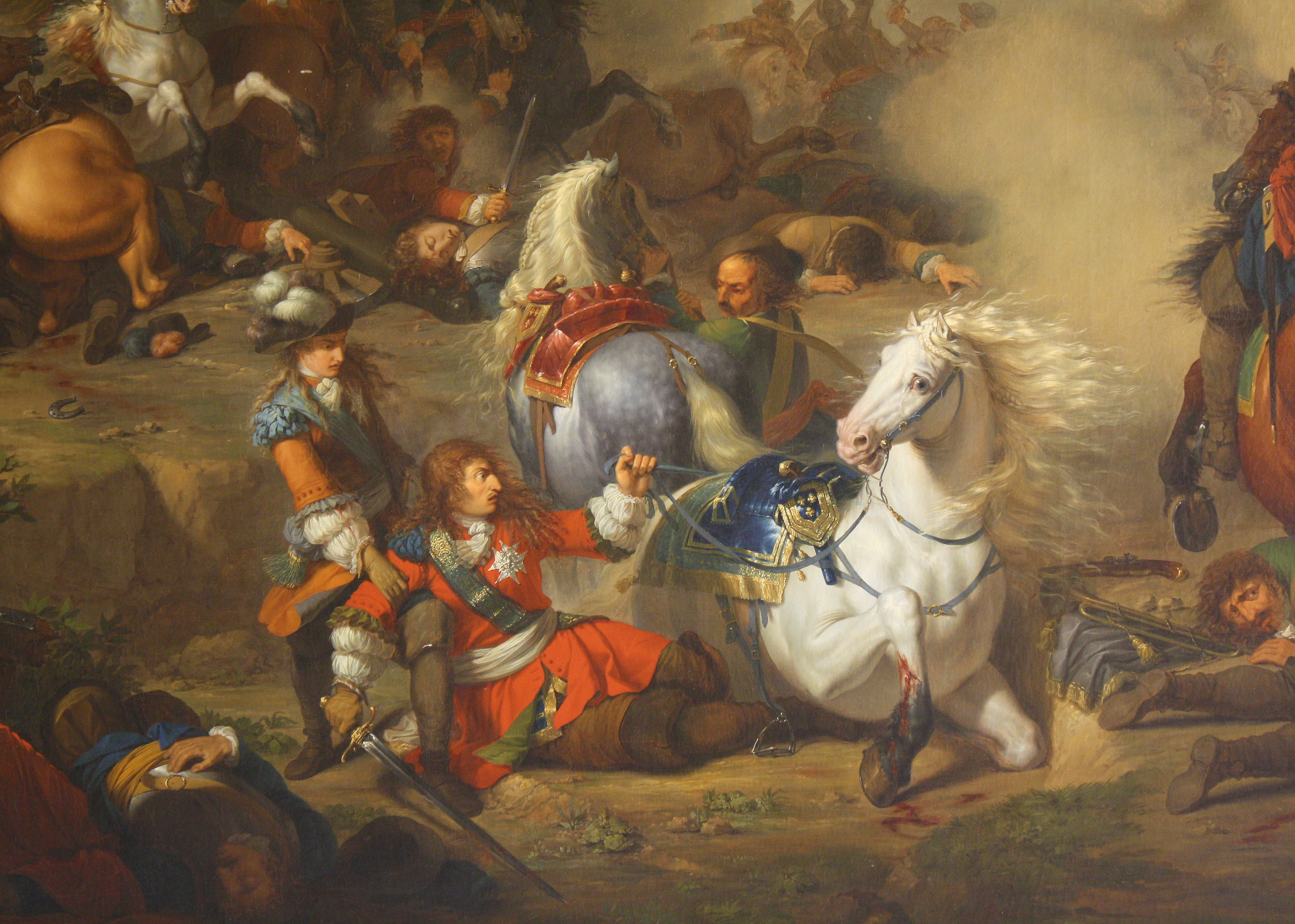
August 11: Louis, Grand Condé is saved by his son during a cavalry charge at the bloody Battle of Seneffe.

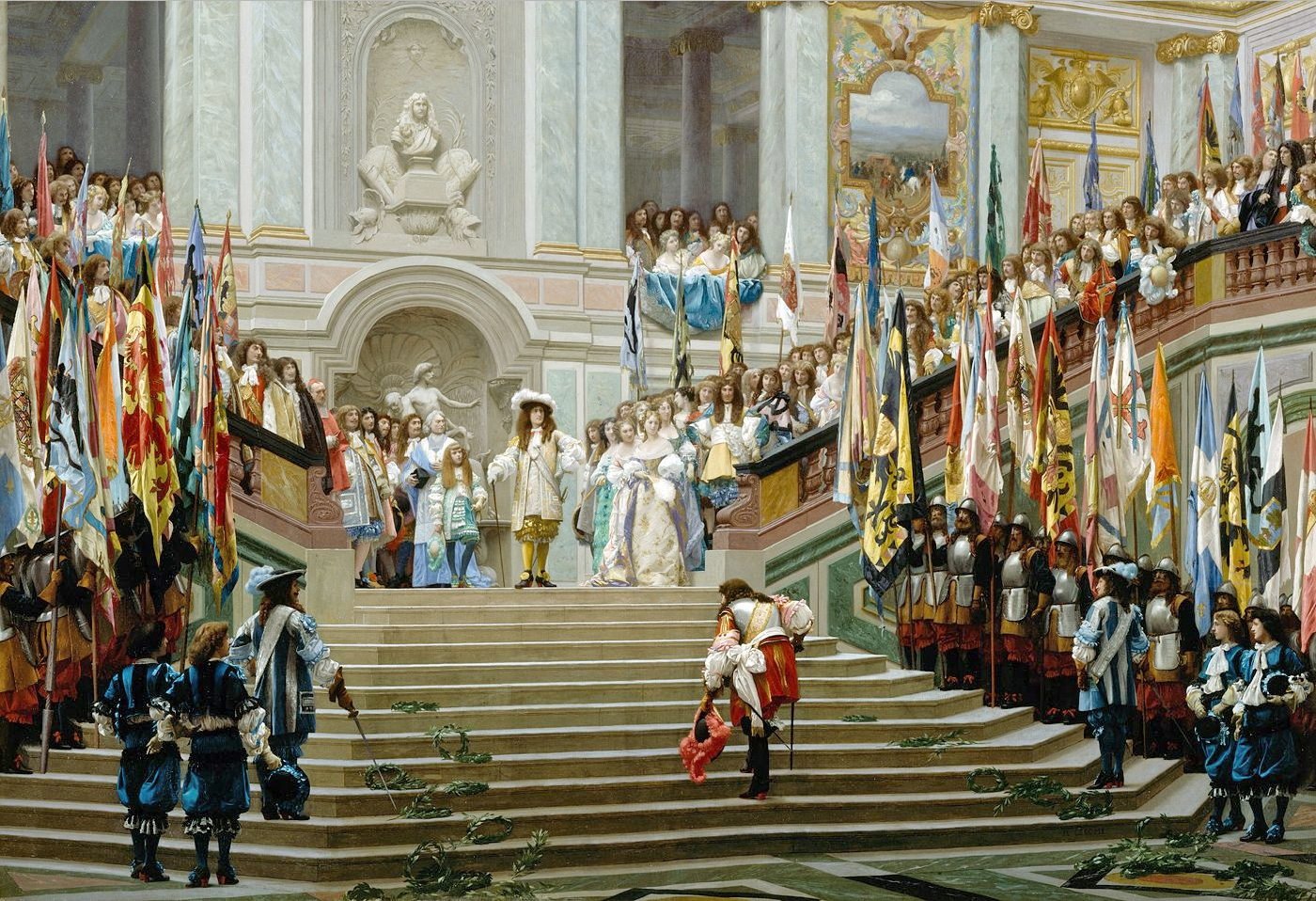
Reception of Conde after the battle at Seneffe

1674 (MDCLXXIV) was a common year starting on Monday of the Gregorian calendar and a common year starting on Thursday of the Julian calendar, the 1674th year of the Common Era (CE) and Anno Domini (AD) designations, the 674th year of the 2nd millennium, the 74th year of the 17th century, and the 5th year of the 1670s decade. As of the start of 1674, the Gregorian calendar was 10 days ahead of the Julian calendar, which remained in localized use until 1923.

== Events ==
=== January–March ===
- January 2 – The French West India Company is dissolved after less than 10 years.
- January 7 – In the Chinese Empire, General Wu Sangui leads troops into the Giuzhou province, and soon takes control of the entire territory without a loss.
- January 15 – The Earl of Arlington, a member of the English House of Commons, is impeached on charges of popery, but the Commons rejects the motion to remove him from office, 127 votes for and 166 against.
- January 19 – The tragic opera Alceste, by Jean-Baptiste Lully, is performed for the first time, presented by the Paris Opera company at the Theatre du Palais-Royal in Paris.
- February 19 – England and the Netherlands sign the Treaty of Westminster, ending the Third Anglo-Dutch War. Its provisions come into effect gradually (see November 10).
- March 14 – Third Anglo-Dutch War: Battle of Ronas Voe – The English Royal Navy captures the Dutch East India Company ship Wapen van Rotterdam in Shetland.

=== April–June ===
- April 10 – In the Ahom kingdom in what is now the northeastern Indian state of Assam, Chamaguriya Khamjang Konwar is installed by the Chief Minister, the Borbarua Debera, as the figurehead King of Ahom. He takes the regnal name Suhung and makes plans to have Debera killed. On April 30, Debera, having learned of the King's intentions, succeeds in having the royal physician poison Suhung's medicine, and installs another ruler.
- April 24 – In India, Shivaji Bhonsale, the Chhatrapati of the Maratha Empire, captures the Kenjalgad Fort in what is now the Maharashtra state.
- April 26 – In the Netherlands, the jurisdiction of Willem, Prince of Orange, Stadtholder of Holland (on the west coast, including Amsterdam and Rotterdam) and Zeeland (southwest coast, including Middelburg, Zeeland), increases in the Dutch Republic as his followers in the inland States of Utrecht (Utrecht, Gelderland and Overijssel) designate him as the hereditary stadtholder. In 1689, he becomes the King of England in addition to his role as the Stadtholder of the Netherlands.
- May 21 – John III Sobieski is elected by the nobility, as King of the Polish–Lithuanian Commonwealth (to 1696).
- June 6 – Shivaji Maharaj is crowned as Chatrapati Shivaji Maharaj of the Maratha Empire at Raigad Fort in India.
- June 12 – The British East India Company arranges a commercial treaty with the Maratha Empire after Henry Oxenden, the company's deputy governor, meets Emperor Shivaji for his recent coronation.

=== July–September ===
- July 4 – A Dutch fleet under Cornelis Tromp Captures the island of Noirmoutier on the French coast. For nearly three weeks, the Dutch occupied the French island and the Dutch fleet captured many French ships in the meantime. The whole coastline from Brest to Bayonne was in turmoil, and French forces gathered to prevent the Dutch from landing. On 23 July the island of Noirmoutier was however abandoned after the Dutch blew up the castle and demolished the coastal batteries.
- July 7 – The Messina revolt against Spanish rule begins on the island of Sicily as the Italian residents besiege the palace of the Spanish Captain-General and drive out the Spanish garrison.
- July 16 – In a major battle in the Third Anglo-Dutch War, a large fleet of 18 warships from the Dutch Republic, along with 15 troop transports, nine storeships and 3,400 soldiers, arrives at the island of Martinique in the Caribbean Sea for the purpose of invasion and capture of Martinique from the French colonists. Admiral Michiel de Ruyter, commander of the Dutch forces, waits for four days before coming ashore. The French defenders, under the direction of the Governor, Antoine André de Sainte-Marthe, take advantage of the situation to block the entrances to the harbor and to reinforce troops. The Dutch invasion force is forced to retreat after sustaining heavy losses.
- July 17 – Two skeletons of children are discovered by workmen repairing a staircase at the White Tower (Tower of London), and believed at this time to be the remains of the Princes in the Tower. The urns containing the bones are interred in 1678 in Westminster Abbey, with an inscription in Latin that states "Here lie interred the remains of Edward V, King of England, and Richard, Duke of York, whose long desired and much sought after bones, after over a hundred and ninety years, were found interred deep beneath the rubble of the stairs that led up to the Chapel of the White Tower, on the 17 of July in the Year of Our Lord 1674."
- August 1 – The 1674 derecho causes a catastrophic impact in Western Europe. In the Netherlands, the derecho causes over 1,050 deaths and devastates cities such as Utrecht and Amsterdam.
- August 11 – The French army under Prince Louis, Grand Condé fights the Dutch–Spanish–Imperial army under William III of Orange at Seneffe in a very bloody, but inconclusive battle.
- September 17 – Sukjong of the Joseon Dynasty, age 13, becomes the new Emperor of Korea upon the death of his father, the Emperor Hyeonjong. Sukjong reigns for more than 45 years until his death on July 12, 1720.
- September 27 – French Navy Commander Jean-Baptiste de Valbelle arrives at Sicily during the Messina revolt to help the Messinese expel the last Spanish defenders, taking the fort at Faro in the harbor entrance.

=== October–December ===
- October 4
  - The Battle of Entzheim takes place in France with 35,000 Holy Roman Empire troops and 22,000 French defenders during the Franco-Dutch War, with the forces fighting near Entzheim south of Strasbourg. While the battle is inconclusive, the outnumbered French win a strategic victory by keeping the Germans from entering French territory. Most of the former battlefield now lies beneath the Strasbourg International Airport.
  - A second coronation is held by the Maratha Empire for the Chhatrapati Shivaji Bhonsle, after the Vedic priest Nischal Puri Goswami decides that the June 18 coronation was "held under inauspicious stars".
- October 15 – The Torsåker witch trials begin in the Torsåker Parish in Sweden, with over 100 men and women accused of witchcraft and the abduction of children. On June 1, 1675, the mass beheading of the 71 people convicted takes place at Häxberget, 65 of whom are women. The others are two men and four boys.
- October 27 – The town of Grave surrenders to a Dutch army after a difficult siege.
- November 10 – As provided in the Treaty of Westminster of February 19, the Dutch Republic cedes its colony of New Netherland to England. This includes the colonial capital, New Orange, which is returned to its English name of New York. The colonies of Surinam, Essequibo and Berbice remain in Dutch hands.
- December 4 – Father Jacques Marquette, along with Pierre Poteret and Jacque Poteret, sails southward along the shore of Lake Michigan, accompanied by nine canoes of Indians from the Potawatomi tribe, and comes ashore at what is now Chicago. The three missionaries, the first Europeans to explore the area, camp there for the winter. Marquette notes in his journal "The land bordering it is of now value, except on the prairies," and adds "There are eight to ten quite fine rivers." A historical marker is now erected on the site of the landing. Father Marquette founds a mission (which will in time grow into the city of Chicago) on the shores of Lake Michigan, in order to create a Christian ministry to convent Native Americans in the Illinois Confederation.

=== Date unknown ===
- The first Dutch West India Company is dissolved.

== Births ==
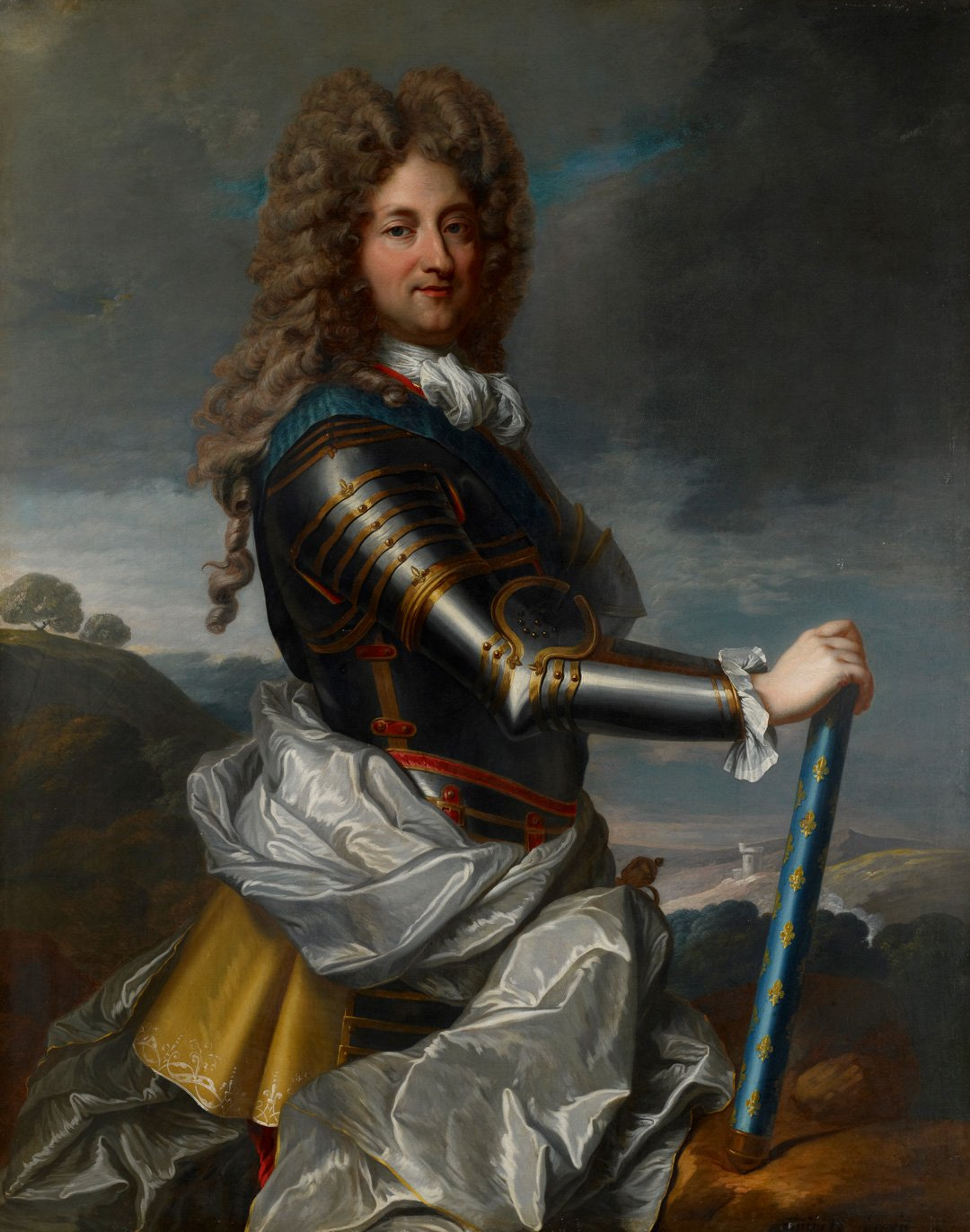
Philippe II, Duke of Orléans

- January 12 – Alexis Simon Belle, French portrait painter (d. 1734)
- January 15 – Prosper Jolyot de Crébillon, French writer (d. 1762)
- January 24 – Thomas Tanner, English bishop and antiquarian (d. 1735)
- March – Jethro Tull, English agriculturist (d. 1741)
- June 3 – Matthias Buchinger, German artist (d. 1740)
- July 12 – Abigail Williams, American accuser in the Salem witch trials (d. 1765)
- July 17 – Isaac Watts, English hymnist (d. 1748)
- August 2 – Philippe II, Duke of Orléans, regent of France (d. 1723)
- August 16 – Catharine Trotter Cockburn, English novelist, dramatist and philosopher (d. 1749)
- August 19 – František Maxmilián Kaňka, Czech architect (d. 1766)
- December 25 – Thomas Halyburton, Scottish theologian (d. 1712)
- Date unknown
  - Jeremiah Clarke, English baroque composer (suicide 1707)
  - Spencer Compton, 1st Earl of Wilmington, Prime Minister of Great Britain (d. 1743)

== Deaths ==
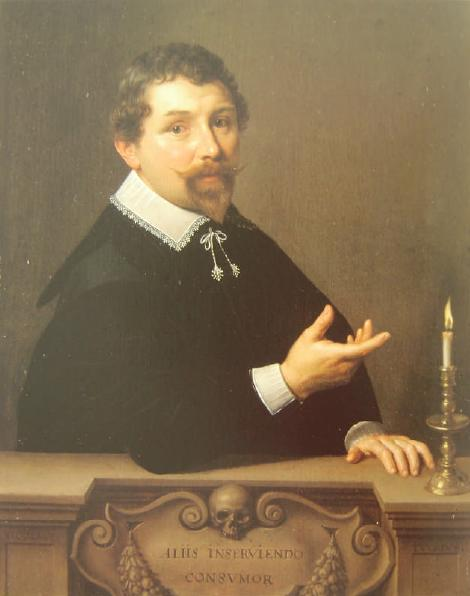
Nicolaes Tulp

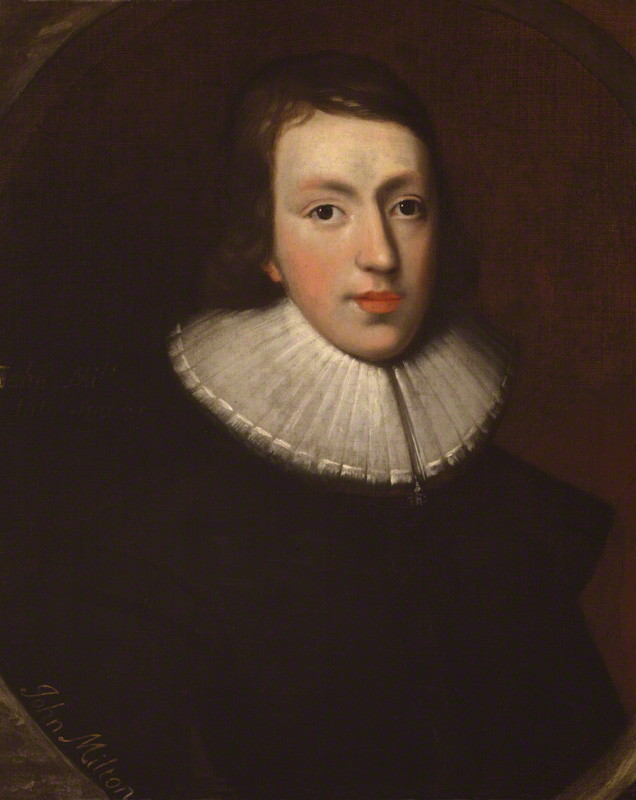
John Milton

- January 3 – Claude Maltret, French Jesuit (b. 1621)
- January 5 – Ebba Brahe, Swedish countess, landowner, and courtier (b. 1596)
- January 10 – Jacob de Witt, Mayor of Dordrecht (b. 1589)
- January 12 – Giacomo Carissimi Italian composer (b. 1605)
- January 21
  - Cornelis Bisschop, Dutch painter (b. 1630)
  - Henri de La Trémoille, French general and noble (b. 1598)
- February 13 – Jean de Labadie, 17th-century French pietist (b. 1610)
- February 14 – Carlo de Tocco, Italian nobleman (b. 1592)
- February 22
  - Jean Chapelain, French writer (b. 1595)
  - John Wilson, English composer (b. 1595)
- February 24 – Matthias Weckmann, German composer (b. 1616)
- February 26 – Jean Pecquet, French anatomist (b. 1622)
- March 2 – Salomon Sweers, Dutch businessman (b. 1611)
- March 8 – Charles Sorel, sieur de Souvigny, French writer (b. 1597)
- March 15 – Edward Digges, English barrister and colonist, Colonial Governor of Virginia (b. 1620)
- March 19 – Queen Inseon, Korean royal consort (b. 1619)
- March 23 – Henry Cromwell, 4th son of Oliver Cromwell and Elizabeth Bourchier (b. 1628)
- March 29 – Ove Bjelke, Norwegian civil servant (b. 1611)
- April 18 – John Graunt, English demographer (b. 1620)
- April 24 – Frances Seymour, Duchess of Somerset (b. 1599)
- June 1 – Beata Rosenhane, Swedish writer (b. 1638)
- June 4 – Jan Lievens, Dutch painter (b. 1607)
- June 8 – Henry Hildyard, English Member of Parliament (b. 1610)
- June 14 – Marin le Roy de Gomberville, French writer (b. 1600)
- June 16 – Empress Xiaochengren, Chinese Qing Dynasty empress (b. 1653)
- June 25
  - Sir Orlando Bridgeman, 1st Baronet, of Great Lever (b. 1606)
  - Mauritia Eleonora of Portugal, Princess of Portugal and countess consort of Nassau-Siegen (b. 1609)
- July 2 – Eberhard III, Duke of Württemberg (b. 1614)
- July 29 – Eva Krotoa, Khoi translator and interpreter (b. 1643)
- July 30
  - Hans Conrad Werdmüller, Swiss military commander (b. 1606)
  - Francisco Ignacio Alcina, Jesuit missionary and historian (b. 1610)
- August 8 – Maeda Toshitsugu, Japanese daimyō of the early Edo period (b. 1617)
- August 12 – Philippe de Champaigne, French painter (b. 1602)
- September 12 – Nicolaes Tulp, Dutch anatomist and politician (b. 1593)
- September 17 – Hyeonjong of Joseon, 18th monarch of the Korean Joseon Dynasty (b. 1641)
- September 22 – Herman Egon, Prince of Fürstenberg, High Chamberlain of the Elector of Bavaria (b. 1627)
- September 27 – Robert Arnauld d'Andilly, French writer (b. 1589)
- September 29 – Gerbrand van den Eeckhout, Dutch painter (b. 1621)
- October 2 – George Frederick of Nassau-Siegen, officer in the Dutch Army (b. 1606)
- October 12 – Jeremias van Rensselaer, Dutch colonial governor (b. 1632)
- October 15 – Robert Herrick, English poet (b. 1591)
- October 27 – Hallgrímur Pétursson, Icelandic poet (b. 1614)
- November 8 – John Milton, English Puritan poet (b. 1608)
- November 16 – Isbrand van Diemerbroeck, Dutch physician (b. 1609)
- November 18 – Charles Lallemant, French Jesuit (b. 1587)
- December 9 – Edward Hyde, 1st Earl of Clarendon, English statesman and historian (b. 1609)
- December 10 – John Vaughan, English judge (b. 1603)
- December 28 – John Oxenbridge, English Nonconformist divine (b. 1608)
- Date unknown
  - Hu Zhengyan, Chinese artist, printmaker, calligrapher and publisher (b. c. 1584)
  - Thomas Traherne, English poet (b. c. 1637)
