= Naval battle of Tarragona =

1641 battle

Coordinates: 41.1181°N 1.2519°E

Battle of Tarragona
- Part of the Franco-Spanish War (1635) and the Reaper's War.
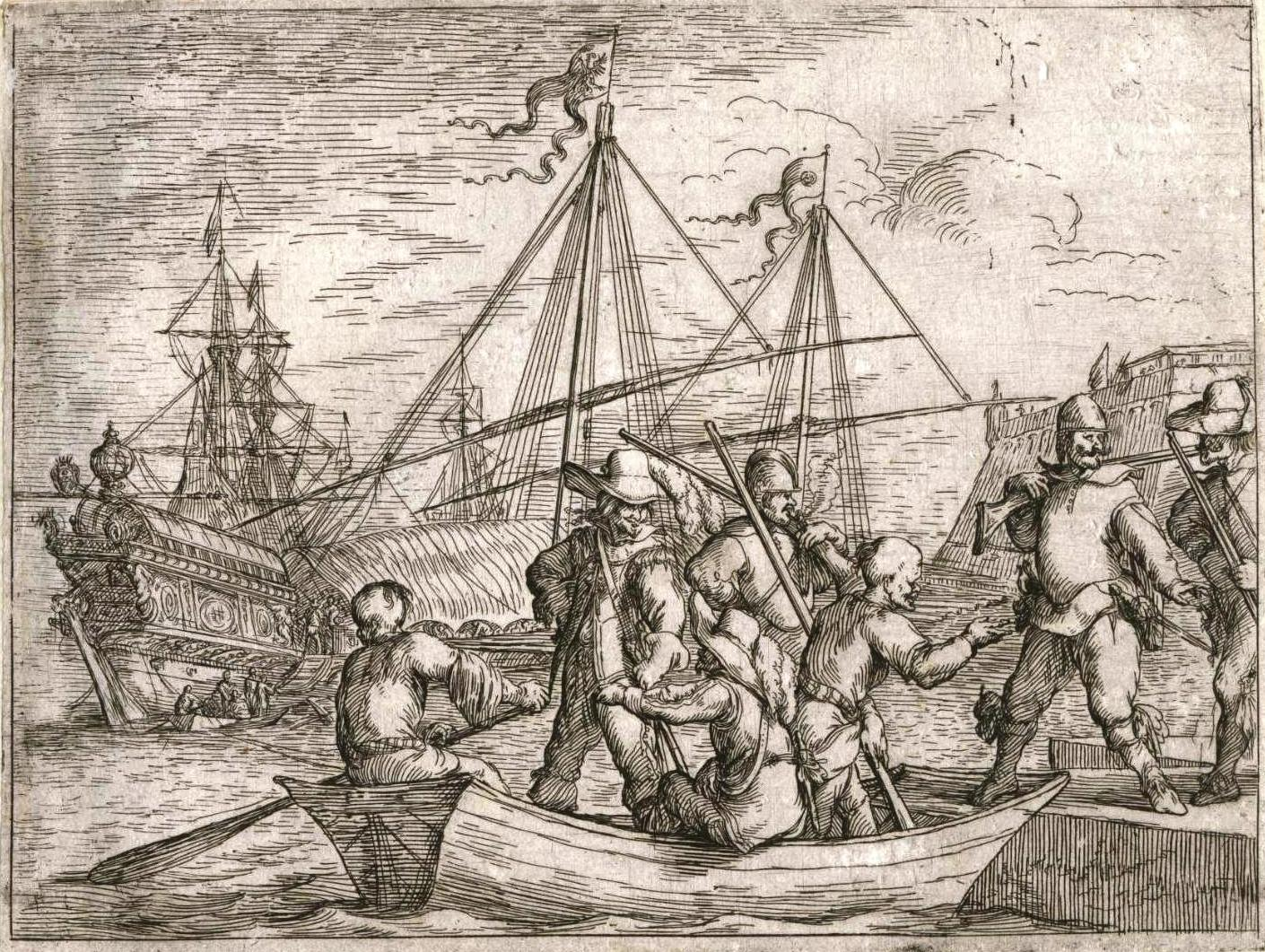
Date	4 to 6 July 1641
Location	Off Tarragona, then the Principality of Catalonia
Result	French victory

Belligerents
France	Spain

Commanders and leaders
(Kingdom of France) Henri d'Escoubleau de Sourdis	(Spain) García Álvarez de Toledo, Duke of Fernandina

Strength
19 sailing ships, 5 fireships, 11 galleys	41 galleys, 7 brigantines

Casualties and losses
50 killed	12 galleys and 2,000 men

The battle of Tarragona fought between 4 and 6 July 1641, was a naval engagement of the Reapers' War in which a Spanish galley fleet led by the Duke of Fernandina attempted to break the French naval blockade of Tarragona, at that time besieged by land by the French and Catalan armies under the French Viceroy of Catalonia. The French blockading fleet was under command of Henri d'Escoubleau de Sourdis, Archbishop of Bordeaux, and consisted both of sailing and rowing vessels. On 4 July it was engaged by the Spanish galleys, of which some managed to enter the port of the town during a fierce action. In the end, a large number of Spanish galleys were abandoned when their crews panicked and fled to the beaches. On the night of 6 July Abraham Duquesne escorted 5 fireships to the mole of the harbor, where the Spanish galleys were abandoned, and set fire to them.

The worsening of the situation inside Tarragona after the battle, caused largely because the vessels that had entered the port remained blocked, adding hundreds of mouths to feed, compelled Philip IV of Spain to order the assembling of a second relief fleet. This time, the number of vessels gathered was much larger, after the joining of Fernandina's squadron with another one commanded by the Duke of Maqueda. Sourdis offered battle to them on 20 August, but was defeated and the blockade was lifted. Viceroy Philippe de La Mothe-Houdancourt had to face simultaneously a land relief, and was forced to abandon the siege, retreating to Valls. Even if the siege and the 2nd Battle were two clear setbacks for the French, some Spanish authors also claim that Fernandina won the first battle.

== Background ==
After the decisive Catalan and French victory over the Spanish army at the Battle of Montjuïc on 26 January 1641, the Franco-Catalan armies took the initiative in the war and began to recover their lost ground. Marshal Philippe de La Mothe-Houdancourt, the newly appointed Viceroy of Catalonia by Louis XIII, decided to lay siege to the port city of Tarragona, one of the major towns of the Principality still in Spanish hands where through the defeated force under the Marquis de Los Vélez had passed after his defeat. The preparations began in March with the concentration of soldiers and supplies at the town of Valls. Meanwhile, the main Spanish army, then led by Federico Colonna, Prince of Butera, had received reinforcements and moved from Tortosa to Constantí, a village near Tarragona where a small garrison was left. The Prince entrenched his army into Tarragona and prepared the defense. In April the Franco-Catalan offensive was launched, and on 4 May, La Mothe was in front of Tarragona ahead of a force of 10.000 foot and 2.000 horse soldiers, and the siege began.

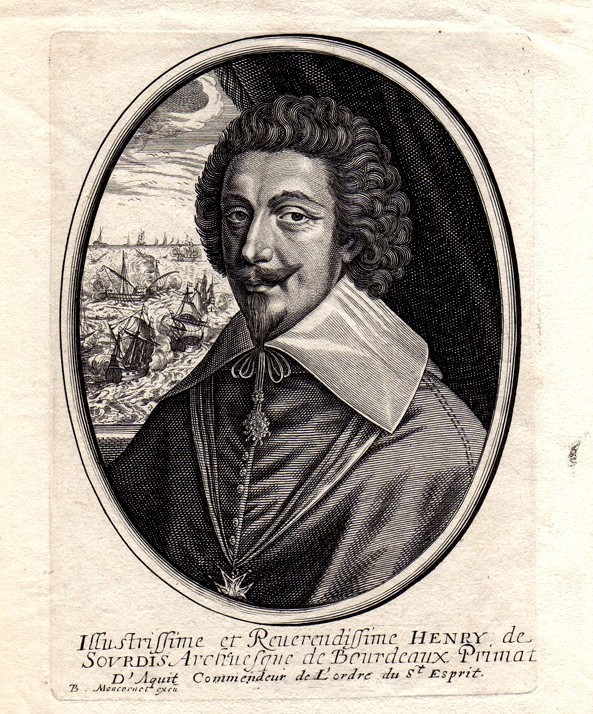
Portrait of Henri d'Escoubleau de Sourdis, commander of the French fleet and Archbishop of Bordeaux.

The fleet commanded by Henri d'Escobuleau de Sourdis was deployed to support the land operations. The French admiral, with some 30 vessels, began a blockade of Tarragona, but given that the city was flanked by 15 miles of beach, his blockade was as much illusory. To resolve the problem, Sourdis engaged his forces in the capture of the fort of Salou on 9 May and the tower of Los Alfaques on 13 May. On 8 June a third fort was built at Tamarin, completing the defenses. The French blockade was not at all ineffective. Though some Spanish vessels managed to enter the port, two Spanish galleys and a big patache full of men and supplies were driven ashore near Port Vendres by 6 of the blockading ships; two sailing vessels and four galleys led by Captains Paul and Banaut. Meanwhile, the Duke of Fernandina, who had with him 21 galleys, captured the galleon Lion d'Or near Blanes but was battered by three French galleons under Captain Boissis, Quelus, and Maran.

Sourdis, who had at that moment 15 galleons, 4 pataches, 5 fireships, 11 galleys, and two prizes, committed the mistake of allowing the Spanish squadrons of Naples, Genoa, and Sicily, under the command of its Generals Melchor de Borja, Gianettino Doria, and Francisco Mejía, to join forces. An aviso intercepted shortly afterwards by the French warned them that the Spaniards were preparing a double relief of the town by land and by sea led respectively by the Marquis of Leganés and the Duke of Fernandina. The Spanish fleet had 41 galleys and 7 brigantines and appeared off Los Alfaques on 3 July. A day later it was in sight of Tarragona, eastwards of the nearest French vessels under Rear Admiral de Cazenac. Sourdis was ill and had entrusted the command of his fleet to the Chevalier de Cangé. Nevertheless, the Archbishop assisted in directing the battle, lying on his bed aboard a shallop.

== Battle ==
The Spanish galleys formed into three squadrons in order to flank the blockading fleet, but seeing Cangé's vessels too far from Cazencac's squadron, 29 of them led by Melchor de Borja crossed the French formation going astern of the 12 ships under the French Rear Admiral. Then they gained the wind. The thirtieth galley, San Felipe, was closely engaged by two French galleys and surrendered. Two other Spanish galleys which lagged behind were captured by the French La Pille and La Reine commanded by Jean-Philippe de Vallbelle. Melchor de Borja had his galleys badly damaged by Cazenac's ships in the process, but thanks to his manoeuver, the Duke of Fernandina managed to reach the relative safety of the harbor with 11 galleys and the 5 brigantines with supplies. Cangé was able to keep them covered behind the mole, thanks to the heavy gunfire of his ships and gave time to his remaining vessels to join him.

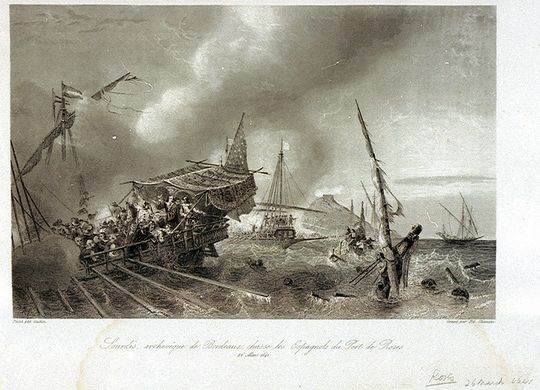
Sourdis chases Spanish vessels into the port of Roses. The French admiral blockaded a number of towns and sustained several fights.

Vice Admiral de Montigny, Abraham Duquesne, and other commanders came close and attacked the Spanish galleys. The Spaniards panicked and began to evacuate the galleys which had taken refuge behind the mole, one of which was set on fire by a French fireship. Firstly the Genoese and later the Spaniards, in all 4,500 men, tried to escape both by swimming or aboard the boats of the galleys. About 300 of them drowned. The confusion amidst the town was considerable, with soldiers and civilians diving into the waves with carts to collect the supplies. Several Spanish galleys were lost: Duquesa of Genoa and Patrona of Sicily sank, the Spanish Santa Barbara of Antonio de Sobremonte was about to sink, as well as Patrona of Genoa and Quatralba of Sicily. The Santa Olalla ran aground near Salou and was destroyed by a party of French cavalry. 450 prisoners and 3 Spanish flags were taken. One of the Spanish officers killed was Captain Leonardo de Moles, infamous all over Catalonia for his crimes against the populace of the country.

During the night, the captains of the French fireships did their best to fill their vessels with gunpowder, and on 6 July, under the escort of 5 sailing ships commanded by Duquesne, they went to set fire to the remaining Spanish galleys. All of them were still abandoned, so it was easy for the French to burn them. Both in the naval battle and the attack on the harbor, no more than fifty Frenchmen were killed. Frustrated by their defeat, the Spaniards even put a price on Sourdis' head. The Duke of Fernandina managed to escape with the galleys which had failed to break the French blockade, claiming to have won the battle for having introduced some relief into Tarragona. Some Spanish historians give credit to this claim, but others, like the Catalan Víctor Balaguer, said that the 11 ships which entered the port were not full of supplies but full of men, which worsened the situation in the city and made a second relief necessary.

== Aftermath ==
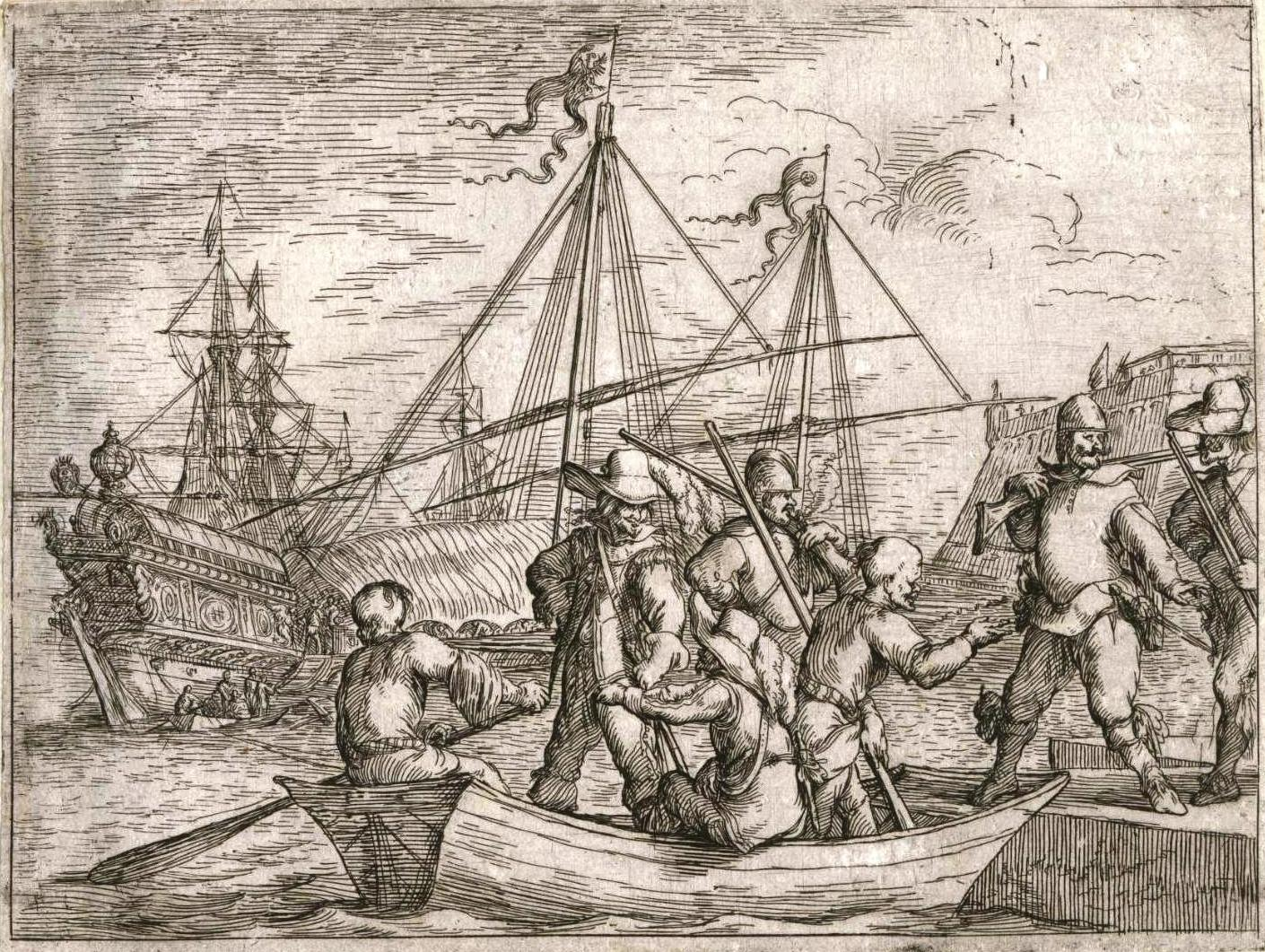
Vessels, galleys, and soldiers on board, circa 1634–1637. The Spanish fleet was composed exclusively of galleys, apart from a few brigantines (small rowing vessels).

As the situation inside Tarragona did not improve after the first relief, Philip IV of Spain, fearing another major blow to his forces in Catalonia, ordered to assemble a second, far bigger force, to force Sourdis to abandon his blockade and introduce soldiers and supplies into the town. The command of this new fleet was entrusted to the Duke of Maqueda, who sailed from Cádiz on 20 July and was joined by more vessels during his voyage along the Levantine coast. The Duke of Fernandina joined this force with his surviving galleys, increasing its strength to 35 sailing ships, 29 galleys and other vessels, up to 108 sail. Sourdis met this fleet off Tarragona on 18 August. The superior numbers of the Spaniards allowed them to flank the French vessels and batter Sourdis, inflicting major damage to two of his galleons. The Archbishop had no chance of victory and ordered the withdrawal.

For more details, see Battle of Tarragona (August 1641).

The Spanish victory saved Tarragona and La Mothe-Houdancourt was forced to leave the siege, retreating to Constantí and Valls pursued by the Spanish army. Cardinal Richelieu released Sourdis of his office and replaced him with the young Jean Armand de Maillé-Brézé, his nephew. According to his opponent Gianettino Doria, Sourdis' treatment was ungrateful. In spite of his success, the Duke of Fernandina was also released from duty. The Count-Duke of Olivares was dissatisfied because Fernandina did not pursue the French fleet and imprisoned him. In the following months Maillé-Brézé proved to be an exceptional commander. He defeated the Spanish fleet in the Battle of Barcelona (1642), a victory which allowed the French armies to capture Collioure and Perpignan.
