= Jean-Baptiste de Valbelle =

French naval officer (1627–1681)

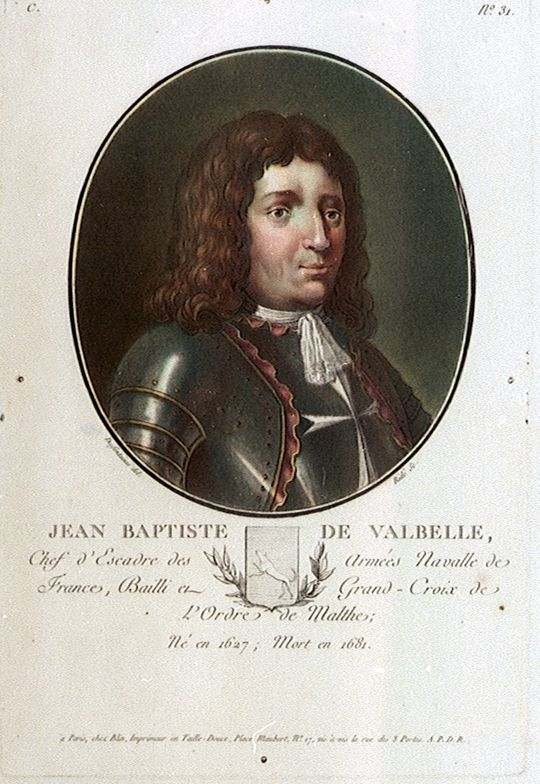
- Born: 1627; Marseille, France
- Died: 17 April 1681 (aged 53–54); Toulon, Var, France
- Occupation: Naval officer

Jean-Baptiste de Valbelle (1627 – 17 April 1681) was a French naval officer, descended from a prominent naval family of Marseille. He is known for his role as commander of a squadron of French ships during the Franco-Dutch War of 1672–78.

== Family ==
Several genealogists trace the origin of the Valbelle family to the old viscounts of Marseille. (Note: According to the Encyclopédie Méthodique (1804) the Valbelle family originated with the early viscounts of Marseille, a branch of the family of the counts of Provence and Forcalquier. The first viscount was Gilbert I, who had a share of the land of Valbelle, from which the name is derived. He participated in the crusades and visited the Holy Land several times. His descendant Geoffroi II, seigneur de Valbelle, raised troops in Provence in 1327 that he led to Naples to aid Charles, Duke of Calabria. Geoffroi de Valbelle, grandson of Geoffroi II, died in 1433 in the defense of Marseille against Alfonso V of Aragon. Honoré de Valbelle was the great grandson of this Geoffroi de Valbelle according to the Encyclopédie.) However, a Sieur Garcinière wrote to Robin de Briancon, author of the Nobiliaire de Provence, that the Valbelle family went back no further than to Honoré I, an apothecary, who made a fortune from his profession and was then elected second consul of Marseille in 1528. Another genealogist states that this proves the nobility of the family, since no second consul of Marseille was ever taken from a mechanical trade. The genealogist Pierre d'Hozier noted on one of these contradictory letters that despite the warning the late Sieur Robert de Briançon did not refrain from drawing up the genealogy of the Valbelle family as requested in exchange for a payment of 1,000 pistoles.

Honoré de Valbelle twice participated in the defense of Marseille, first against the constable of Bourbon who raised the siege in 1524, and then against Charles V, Holy Roman Emperor in 1536. Honoré left handwritten memoirs on these two defenses. His son, Cosme de Valbelle, was captain of 50 men in the army of Francis I of France and fought in the Battle of Ceresole (1544). Under Henry II of France, he commanded three galleys sent to the Kingdom of Naples in 1552 to help the prince of Salerno, and in 1553 he helped take the Isle of Corfu. His son Antoine commanded Marseille in 1579 and 1584 against the Huguenots. Antoine's son Cosme II was a captain of 100 men and commander of a galley under Louis XIII.

== Life ==
=== Early years (1627–47) ===
Côme II de Valbelle married Anne-Marguerite de Paule in 1606, daughter of Francois de Paul and Jeanne de Puget. They had two sons, Jean-Philippe and Jean-Baptiste de Valbelle. Jean-Baptiste was born in Marseille in 1627. His family home in Marseille was a house built towards the end of the 16th century adorned with delicate sculptures. It had a porch with columns that supported a stone into which the family coat of arms had been engraved. Côme II died on 15 August 1638 at the age of 70 in a clash with Spanish galleys outside Genoa. Jean-Philippe, the older son, was lieutenant on the galley Valbelle and was badly wounded in this action. In recognition of his role in the fight he was made capitaine de galère on 15 December 1638 in command of the Valbelle. The parish church of Marseille was given the flags of the Spanish galleys that Côme II de Valbelle had defeated before Genoa in 1638, which were hung above the high altar.

At the age of fourteen Valbelle served in the forces of the Henri de Sourdis, Archbishop of Bordeaux in the Battle of Tarragona (August 1641), where he was wounded. He fought in the Battle of Barcelona in 1642 under Jean Armand de Maillé-Brézé, and was the first to board one of the enemy ships. As a reward he was given a small boat that he named Le Persée. Soon after he encountered a Spanish ship stronger than his own, approached without firing a single shot, grappled it, boarded it with all his volunteers and soldiers, gained its surrender after a fierce battle and took it to Toulon. This was one of several valuable prizes he took around this time, which contributed to his large fortune. The Order of Saint John accepted his membership as an officer despite his young age. He fought in many engagements against the Muslims.

=== Galley captain (1647–66) ===
Valbelle became a galley captain during the regency of Anne of Austria (r. 1643–1651). He was made galley captain in 1647 after rising through the ranks of ensign and lieutenant. During the Fronde rebellion (1648–53) he remained faithful to the crown. On 8 October 1649 at the Siege of Candia he personally made a Turkish pasha prisoner, whom he was going to take to the city alive, but being surrounded by attackers was forced to kill his prisoner to save himself. He alternated between the service of religion and of his country. In October 1654 he served on one of the ships of the Chevalier Paul and gave remarkable service in the taking of Castellammare di Stabia. In 1655, when the navy of Louis XIV was very weak, he armed two galleys at his own expense to fight the Spanish and the Turks, and distinguished himself in several fights. In 1655 he commanded a single vessel that fought four English ships, dismasted two of the enemy ships and obtained an honourable surrender.

=== Ship captain (1666–74) ===
In 1666 Valbelle was promoted to capitaine de vaisseau. In 1669 he commanded a squadron that tried to relieve the Siege of Candia, and then commanded another squadron on the coasts of Tunisia and Algeria. He fought with distinction in the Franco-Dutch War of 1672–78. Antoine Lefèbvre de La Barre, the future governor of New France, commanded the Maure in 1674 in the Valbelle's Mediterranean fleet. At that time Valbelle was about 51 years old, a man of medium height, swarthy, nervous and agile. As an adventurous young man he had been attractive to women and had various affairs. His secret correspondence with the king and his ministers Colbert and Seignelay shows he had an original turn of mind, was witty, bold and familiar.

=== Sicily (1674–76) ===
Messina and Sicily

Valbelle is best known for his expedition to Messina, Sicily, in 1674–75. At this time Messina was divided between two factions, the Merli who supported Spain and the Malvizzi who sought the protection of France. In the 1674 Messina revolt the people of the city drove out the Spanish garrison, gained control of almost all of the city and its forts and requested protection from Louis XIV. Valbelle was with the fleet of Louis Victor de Rochechouart de Mortemart, Compte de Vivonne, at anchor off the coast of Catalonia, when the news arrived. On 27 September 1674 Vivonne sent Valbelle with a small squadron to help the rebels. Valbelle helped the Messinese expel the Spanish from the last fort, the Faro at the harbour entrance. Lacking sufficient provisions and land forces to act against the Spanish, he left to ask for more effective assistance.

On 1 January 1675 Valbelle's squadron returned, bringing a small corps of land forces under Lieutenant-General Vallavoire^{(fr)}. The Spanish army was camped outside the city, had retaken some of the forts and seemed to be about to take the city. The Spanish had a fleet of 22 ships and 19 galleys cruising at the entrance to the Strait of Messina. Valbelle had six warships and three fire ships, boldly attempted the passage on 8 January 1675 and entered the harbour unharmed. He was helped by a favorable tide and a stern wind. Although the Spanish troops withdrew some distance from the city, Valavoire did no have the resources to advance inland, and provisions soon ran low again.

Vivonne sent another squadron under Capitaine de Tourville. He joined Valbelle, but together they were still not strong enough to attack the Spanish Admiral Melchor de la Cueva's force of 15 sailing warships and 15 galleys. Vivonne himself arrived on 11 February 1675 with eight warships and three fireships. The French fleet now had 20 sailing warships, of which nine were ships of the line. The French easily defeated the Spanish in the Battle of the Lipari Islands, and captured the 44-gun frigate Nuestra Señora del Pueblo. Vivonne was now able to sail into Messina, delivering large quantities of food. In the remainder of 1675 the French increased their strength in Sicily and along the southern coast of Italy. Vivonne took Augusta, Sicily, on 17 August 1675.

The States General of the Dutch Republic sent a fleet under Admiral Michiel de Ruyter to the aid of Spain. Abraham Duquesne opposed it and engaged in a furious battle on 8 January 1676 in the Battle of Stromboli off the coast of Calabria. After reinforcements joined Ruyter he wanted to retake Augusta. Vivonne and Valballe went to its aid, and on 22 April 1676 fought the Battle of Augusta. Valbelle commanded the vanguard after vice admiral d'Almeras^{(fr)} was killed at the start of the battle. Ruyter had his right leg smashed and half of his left foot swept away by a cannonball from Valbelle's ship. The siege of Augusta was raised, and Ruyter died of his wounds in the port of Syracuse. On 3 June 1676 a third engagement was decisive, when Vivonne and Valbelle destroyed the remainder of the combined fleet of Spain and Holland in the Battle of Palermo.

=== Last years (1676–81) ===
In 1679 Valbelle was charged with punishing the corsairs of Tripoli. He forced them to surrender and freed a great many slaves. On return from this expedition Pope Innocent XI named Valbelle bailli and Grand Cross of the Order of Malta. Valbelle died in Toulon, Var, on 17 April 1681.

== Sources ==
- Blackmore, David S.T. (2011-03-22), Warfare on the Mediterranean in the Age of Sail: A History, 1571–1866, McFarland, ISBN 978-0-7864-5784-7
- Encyclopédie Méthodique, Ou Par Ordre De Matieres: Par Une Société De Gens De Lettres, De Savants Et D'Artistes (in French), vol. 6, Panckoucke, 1804
- Guérin, Léon (1861), Les marins illustres de la France (in French), Morizot
- Jean-Baptiste de Valbelle (1627-1681) (in French), BnF: Bibliotheque nationale deFrance
- La Roque, Robert. (2000), "Le Febvre de la Barre, Joseph-Antoine", Dictionary of Canadian Biography, vol. 1
- Martin, Henri (1865), Martin's History of France: The Age of Louis XIV, Translated by Mary Louise Booth, Walker, Wise and Company
- Sue, Eugène (1836), Histoire de la marine française (in French), Félix Bonnaire
