= Bernardino de Cárdenas, 3rd Duke of Maqueda =

Spanish noble and statesman

Bernardino de Cárdenas y Portugal (Torrijos, 20 January 1553 – Palermo, 17 December 1601), 3rd Duke of Maqueda, 2nd Marquis of Elche, was a Spanish noble and statesman.

He was the son of Bernardino de Cárdenas y Pacheco, 2nd Duke of Maqueda, 1st Marquis of Elche, and of Isabel de Velasco, daughter of Íñigo Fernández de Velasco, 2nd Duke of Frías, Constable of Castile.

He was viceroy of Catalonia and of Sicily.

He married Luisa Manrique de Lara, 5th Duchess of Nájera and had 4 sons and 2 daughters.
He was succeeded by his eldest surviving son Jorge de Cárdenas y Manrique de Lara.

Government offices
Preceded by Pedro Luis Galcerán de Borja	Viceroy of Catalonia; 1593–1597	Succeeded by Lorenzo IV Suárez de Figueroa y Córdoba
Preceded by Giovanni Ventimiglia	Viceroy of Sicily; 1598–1601	Succeeded by Jorge de Cárdenas y Manrique de Lara
Spanish nobility
Preceded by Bernardino de Cárdenas y Pacheco	Duke of Maqueda; 1560–1601	Succeeded by Jorge de Cárdenas y Manrique de Lara
