= François d'Escoubleau de Sourdis =

French Catholic prelate

His Eminence François d'Escoubleau de Sourdis
- Archbishop of Bordeaux
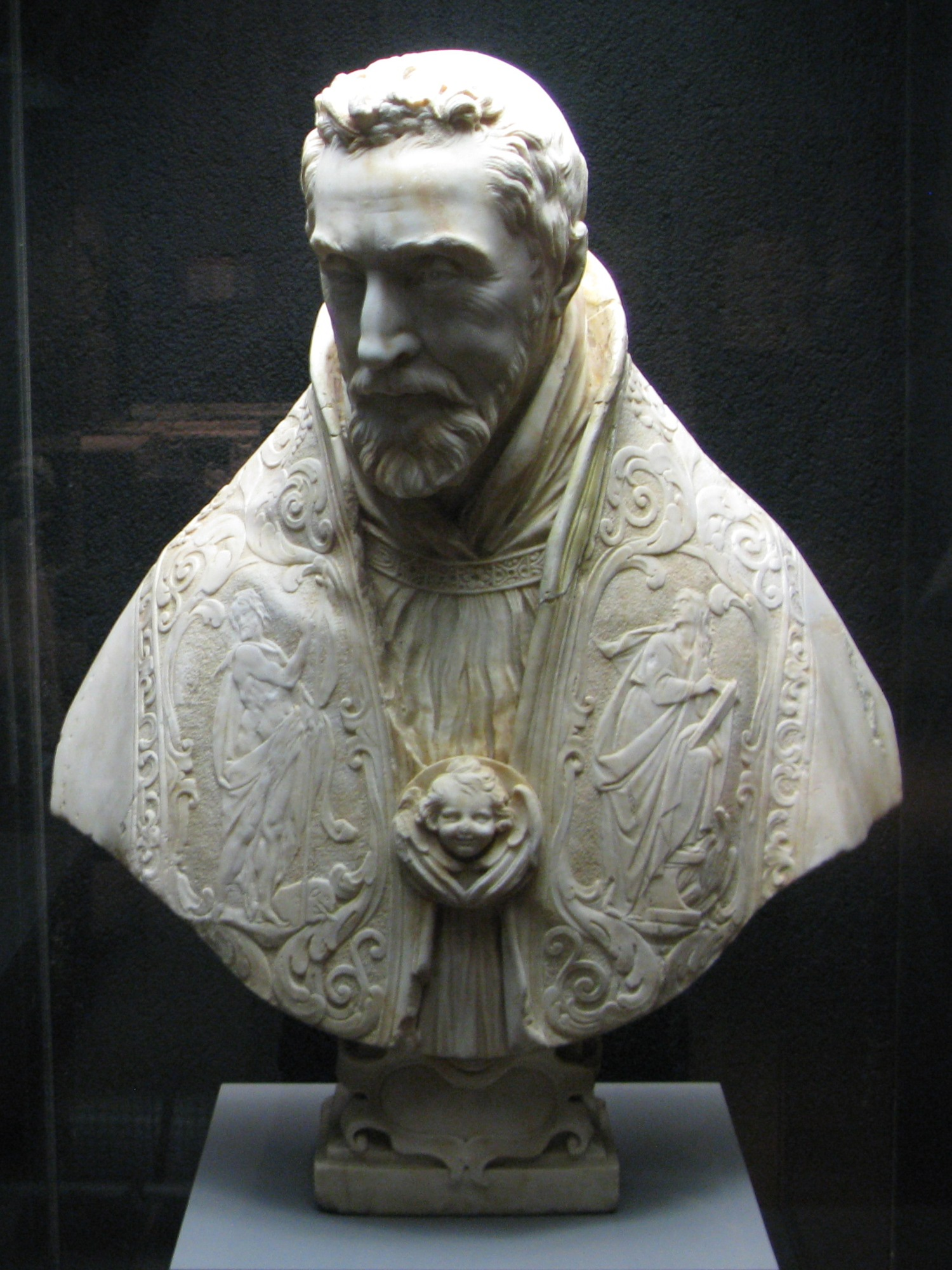
- Bust by Gian Lorenzo Bernini, c. 1620-1622
- Church: Catholic Church
- Archdiocese: Bordeaux
- Appointed: 5 July 1599
- Term ended: 18 June 1628
- Predecessor: Jean Le Breton
- Successor: Henri de Sourdis

Orders
- Consecration: 21 December 1599 by François de Joyeuse
- Created cardinal: 3 March 1599 by Pope Clement VIII
- Rank: Cardinal-Priest

Personal details
- Born: François d'Escoubleau de Sourdis; 25 October 1574 Mauléon, France
- Died: 7 February 1628 (aged 53) Bordeaux, France
- Coat of arms

François d'Escoubleau de Sourdis (25 October 1574 – 1628) was a French Catholic prelate, the archbishop of Bordeaux and founder of the Irish College in Bordeaux in 1603.

== Biography ==
He was born at Châtillon-sur-Sèvre in Poitou, the eldest son of François d'Escoubleau and Isabeau Babou de la Bourdasière. His father was seigneur of Jouy, Auneau and Mondoubleau, marquis d'Alluye, and governor of Chartres, and François himself held the title of Count of La Chapelle.

As the eldest son, he was not initially destined for a career in the church. He studied humanities at the Collège de Navarre in Paris, fought in the siege of Chartres (1591) and was engaged to marry Catherine Hurault de Cheverny, daughter of the royal chancellor Philippe Hurault. During a visit to Rome, he met Federico Borromeo and Filippo Neri and decided to enter the church. He was named commendatory abbot of Preuilly, of Montréal, and of Aubrac (1597-1600) and created cardinal priest in the consistory of 3 March 1599 by Pope Clement VIII.

With the aid of a dispensation for being under the required age, he was elected archbishop of Bordeaux and primate of Aquitaineon 5 July 1599. He was consecrated on 21 December 1599 at St. Germain des Près, Paris, by Cardinal François de Joyeuse, archbishop of Toulouse, and received the cardinal's hat almost exactly one year later (20 December 1600).

In Bordeaux, de Sourdis embarked on a number of urban improvements such as draining swampy areas of the city, renovating the medieval Archbishop's Palace, ordering enhancements to the chapel of Saint Michael's Basilica, and building the Cloister of the Cordeliers in the town of Saint-André-de-Cubzac (which today houses the local public library) and the church of Saint-Bruno of Bordeaux (1611-1620). In 1603 de Sourdis welcomed Reverend Dermit MacCarthy, a priest of the Diocese of Cork, and forty companions, who formed the core of the new Irish College at the University of Bordeaux.

In 1605 he became coadjutor, with right of succession, of his uncle Henri d'Escoubleau de Sourdis, bishop of Mallezais, and in 1607 he had the honor of baptizing the duke of Orléans, second son of King Henry IV of France. In 1615, he officiated at the wedding of Elisabeth of France with Infant Felipe (future Philip IV of Spain), and of Louis XIII, king of France, with Infanta Anne of Austria, Felipe's sister, in St. Andrew's Cathedral.

He was succeeded as Archbishop at his death by his brother, Henri de Sourdis.
