= Henri de Sourdis =

French naval commander and Archbishop

The Most Reverend Henri d'Escoubleau de Sourdis
- Bordeaux
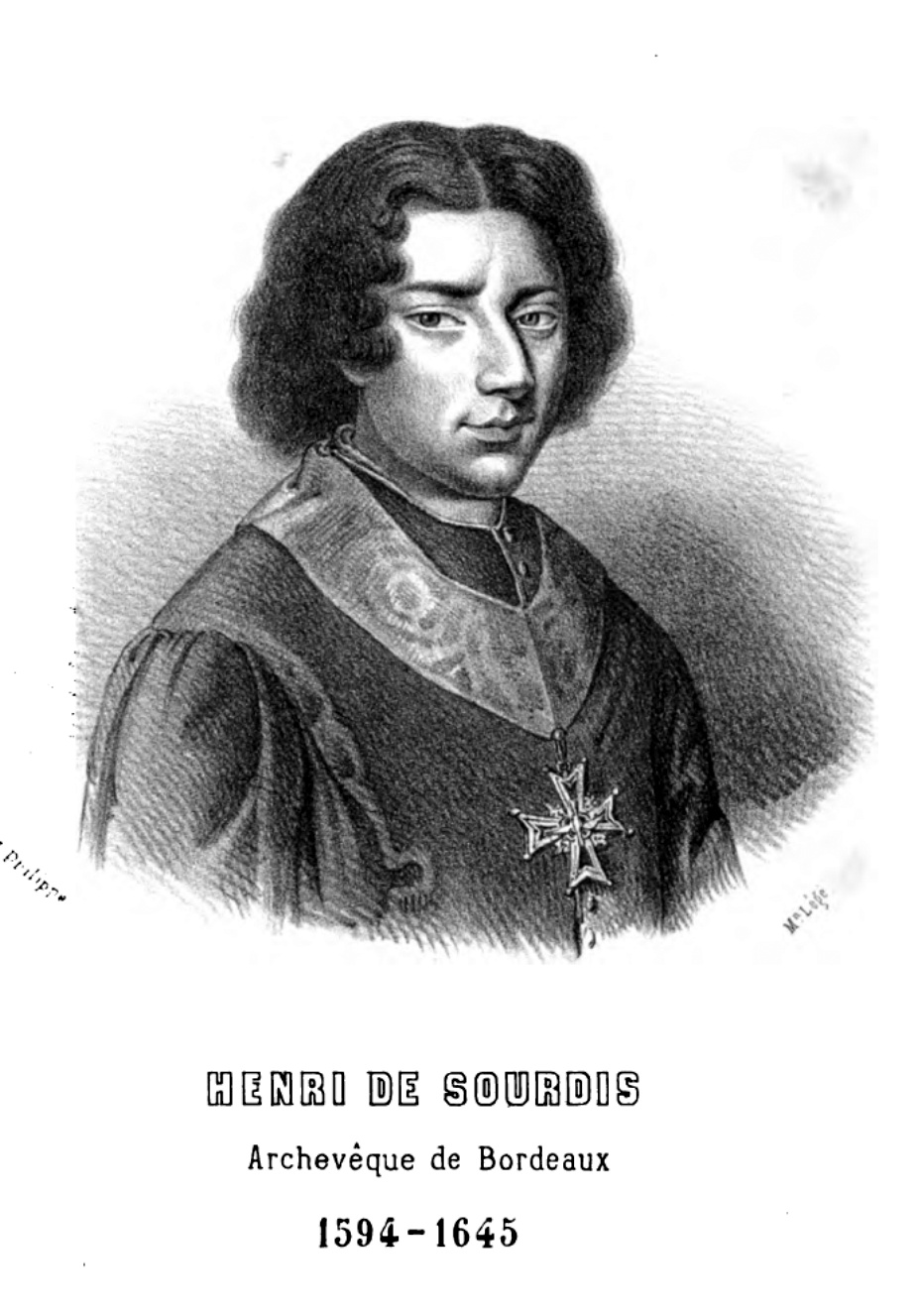
- Henri de Sourdis
- Church: Catholic Church
- Diocese: Bordeaux
- In office: 1629-1645
- Predecessor: François de Sourdis
- Successor: Henri de Bethune

Orders
- Consecration: 19 March 1623 by François de Sourdis

Personal details
- Born: 20 February 1593
- Died: 18 June 1645 (aged 52) Auteuil, France
- Denomination: Catholicism

Henri d'Escoubleau de Sourdis, 20 February 1593 to 18 June 1645, was a French naval commander and Archbishop of Bordeaux.

Like many churchmen of his day, de Sourdis was a military man as well as a prelate. Appointed Bishop of Maillezais in 1619, he fought in the Thirty Years' War and in 1628 served as commander of the artillery at the Siege of La Rochelle. The next year, 1629, Henri succeeded his brother François de Sourdis as Archbishop of Bordeaux. The succession had been legally arranged several years before and was confirmed by Cardinal Richelieu the day François died.

In 1635 Richelieu declared war on Spain (see Franco-Spanish War (1635–1659)). However, the Spanish fleet mobilised more quickly and Spain seized the Lérins Islands in September 1635. In 1635 Henri, Count of Harcourt was put in charge of a large fleet of 25 ships, 6 fire ships and 12 flutes, with orders to drive the Spanish out. According to Jenkins an early difficulty in the French navy was that officers would only obey those whose birth placed them in a higher social position. Richelieu was well aware that a navy required experienced officers who would work together and support each other. The Comte d'Harcourt's flag-captain was the Chevalier Philippe des Gouttes, an experienced, fighting seaman. It seems that Richelieu hoped that des Gouttes would give the necessary advice to de Sourdis who would have the personality to force it on to d'Harcourt. Squabbles between the officers rendered the fleet inoperable throughout 1636 and it wasn't until February 1637 when de Sourdis attacked Oristano in Sardinia. The purpose was to exchange Oristano for the Lérins.

The expedition against Oristano failed, but officers and crews gained valuable experience. In March 1637, d'Harcourt attacked the Lérins, taking Sainte-Marguerite after heavy fighting, and Saint-Honorat, shortly afterwards.

Richelieu had learned the folly of a divided command and de Sourdis was placed in sole command of the Atlantic squadrons. He was ordered to take Fuenterrabia. He surprised the Spanish and having established the blockade, divided his fleet into the usual three squadrons. He left Claude de Razilly to maintain the blockade, sent Montigny to scout westwards to warn of any approaching Spanish fleet, and kept his own squadron in reserve.

Once the Spanish fleet was sighted, he joined Montigny to attack them. The Spanish admiral had moored his ships in a line in shallow water which restricted the number of French ships which could engage. De Sourdis' larger flagship, L'Europe, of 34-guns could not risk entering the shallows. A full account of this engagement (the Battle of Guétaria, 22 August 1638) is given by Jenkins. Montigny's 6 ships were sent in and engaged the Spanish line very successfully, taking full advantage of the wind and heavy swell. Once French fireships were released to complete the victory, the Spanish panicked. The Royal Navy of France had won a complete victory, destroying the Coruña squadron for the loss of just 40 French casualties.

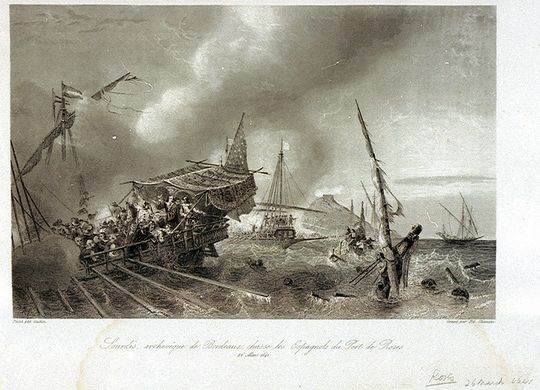
Sourdis, Archbishop of Bordeaux, defeats the Spanish at the Port de Roses, 26 March 1641

The land attack on Fuenterrabia Siege of Fuenterrabía (1638) was not pushed vigorously, perhaps because the French expected the town to surrender once attempts to relieve it by sea had failed. De Sourdis returned to his blockade, landed his marines, but they were too late to make any difference. The French fleet was left to carry away to safety the remaining French forces which had not retreated by land. Political squabbles returned to the fore when encouraged by Richelieu, De Sourdis attempted to blame the defeat on one of his generals, Bernard de La Valette, duke d'Épernon. D'Épernon had refused to lead the attack, believing that it would fail. Richelieu's niece had been unhappily married to de La Vallete and his father, Jean Louis de Nogaret de La Valette, had publicly struck de Sourdis four years before).

In 1639, de Sourdis was in command of a powerful fleet of 37 ships, plus fireships and transports. He was to attack a Spanish fleet of 35 ships in La Coruña, but the Spanish were in a strongly defended position and the attack was called off.

In 1640, de Sourdis was moved to command in the Mediterranean, but found few opportunities for battle because of the uncertain neutrality of the Republic of Genoa.

In 1641, De Sourdis was ordered to support the French attack on Tarragona by blockading the port. He disagreed with the plan, considering it better to first conquer the province of Rousillon which lay between Catalonia and France. However, he followed his orders, and completed the blockade. He repelled the first attempt to relieve Tarragona (Naval Battle of Tarragona (July 1641)) by a galley fleet led by the Duke of Fernandina, destroying or capturing Spanish supply galleys. As the Spanish collected another large fleet at Cartagena, de Sordis favoured an attack on this fleet whilst it was forming. However, he was overruled at a council of war and as a result found himself attacked by a force of more than twice his own strength. The French held their own, but this time the Spanish supply ships were able to relieve the town. With many of his ships badly damaged, de Sourdis was obliged to return to Toulon to refit (Battle of Tarragona (August 1641)).

This time, Richelieu did not support him and de Sourdis found himself in disgrace. He retired to his diocese in Bordeaux. He died there in 1645.

According to Jenkins, though he was not a real seaman, he had an admirable grasp of naval strategy as it could be applied at the time. He was handicapped by political wranglings and councils of war which were not as naturally aggressive as he was. Despite this his captains believed in him and 14 of them, led by the Chevalier de Cangé, protested to Richelieu over his removal.
