= Battle of Tarragona (August 1641) =

1641 naval battle

Coordinates: 41°09′58″N 1°12′50″E

- Part of the Franco-Spanish War (1635) and the Catalan Revolt
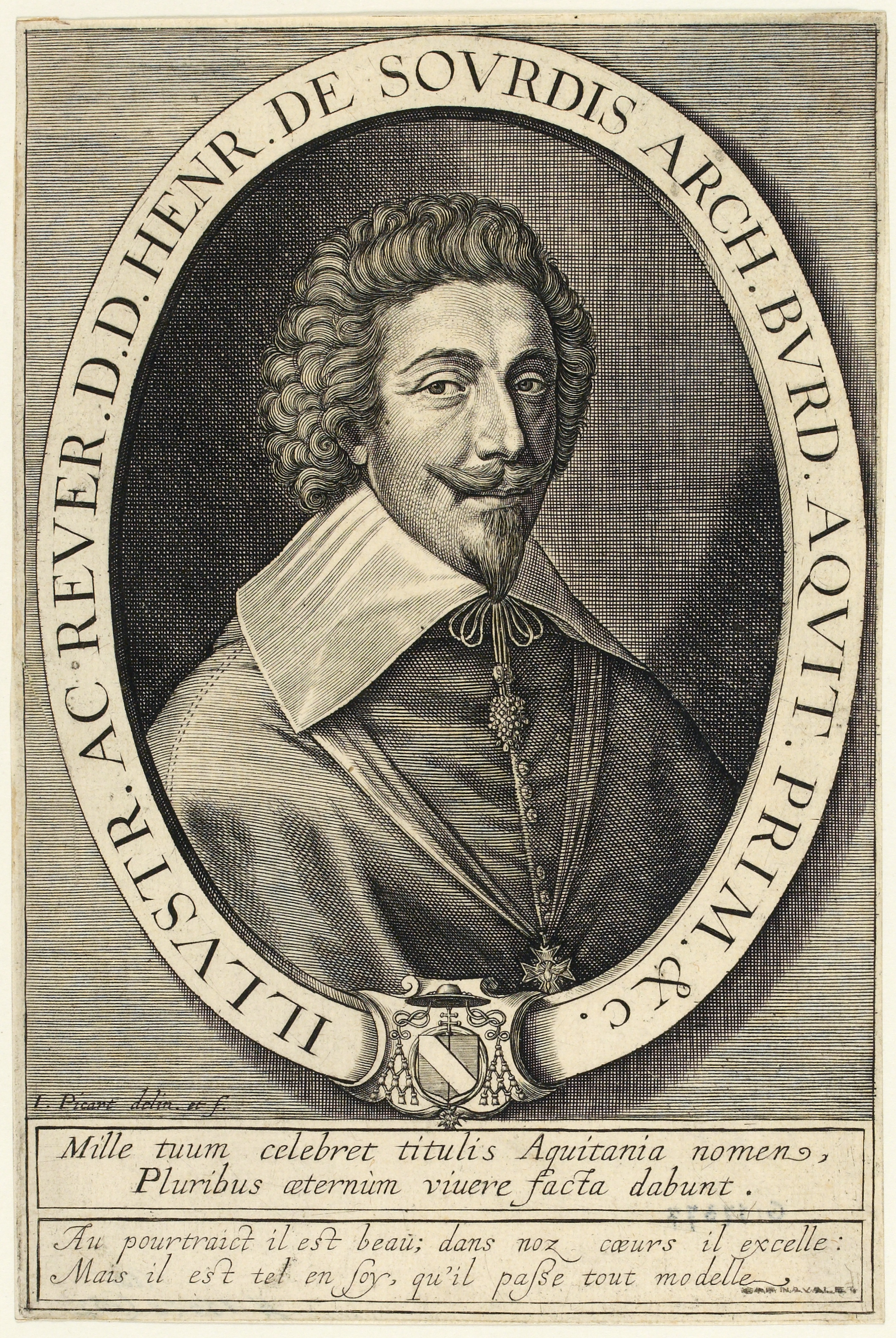
Date	20 – 25 August 1641
Location	Off Tarragona, Principality of Catalonia, France
Result	Spanish victory; End of the French naval blockade; Spanish naval control of the area; Retreat of the French naval and land forces

Belligerents
France	Spain

Commanders and leaders
(Kingdom of France) Henri d'Escoubleau de Sourdis	(Spain) Duke of Fernandina (Spain) Duke of Maqueda

Strength
26 galleons 19 galleys 8 brigantines 4 fireships	30–35 galleons and frigates 29 galleys 65 transport ships

Casualties and losses
Severe human losses and naval damage 1 fireship captured	Minor

The Battle of Tarragona of August 1641 was a naval battle that took place between 20 – 25 August 1641, between the Spanish and French fleets during the French stage of the Thirty Years' War. The Spanish fleet, led by the Duke of Fernandina and the Duke of Maqueda broke the French naval blockade of Tarragona and defeated the French fleet under Henri d'Escoubleau de Sourdis, forcing it to retreat. The city was also besieged by land since April by a Franco-Catalan army commanded by Philippe de La Mothe-Houdancourt. The Spanish success in driving Sourdis out of the area, together with the arrival of a relief force sent by land, forced the Franco-Catalan army to leave the siege, and to retreat to Valls, pursued by the Spanish army.

The Spanish victory prevented the fall of Tarragona to the French and Catalan rebel forces, for which Cardinal Richelieu deprived Sourdis of his office and replaced him with the young Jean Armand de Maillé-Brézé, his nephew. In spite of his success, the Duke of Fernandina was also dismissed from duty. The Count-Duke of Olivares was dissatisfied because the Duke of Fernandina failed to destroy the French fleet, and imprisoned him. The case was truly unusual: the two admirals, both the victor and the vanquished, had the same bitter reward. However, the ostracism of the French Admiral was final, while the Spanish Admiral was soon restored after the fall of Olivares in 1643, and even became part of the Council of the King of Spain.

== Background ==
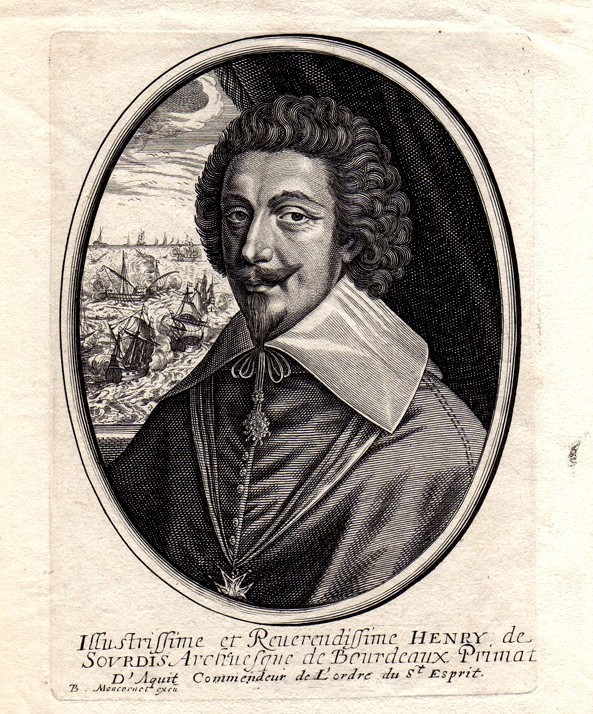
Henri d'Escoubleau de Sourdis, commander of the French fleet.

In April 1641, the Catalan rebels and the French troops led by Marshal Philippe de La Mothe-Houdancourt sent to support them, launched an offensive to capture Tarragona, one of the few remaining Catalan towns in Spanish hands. On 29 April, La Mothe was in front of Tarragona with his army, composed of 10,000 infantry and 2,000 cavalry, and laid siege to the town. The French Mediterranean fleet, commanded by Henri d'Escoubleau de Sourdis, was deployed to support the land operations, and the French Admiral began a naval blockade of Tarragona. Between 4 and 6 July 1641, a large Spanish galley fleet led by the Duke of Fernandina attempted to break the French naval blockade over Tarragona. He succeeded at a heavy cost to introduce some relief into Tarragona, but failed to break the blockade.

For more details, see Naval Battle of Tarragona (July 1641)

In response to the failure, Philip IV of Spain ordered to assemble a second, far bigger force, to force Sourdis to abandon his blockade and introduce soldiers and supplies into the town. The command of this new fleet was entrusted to the Duke of Maqueda, who sailed from Cádiz on 20 July. The squadrons of Galicia and Dunkirk, and the galleys of Naples, Sicily, and Genoa were gathered at Cartagena. The Duke of Fernandina joined this force with the remains of his fleet, increasing its strength to 30 or 35 galleons and frigates, 29 galleys, and 65 transport ships full of supplies. At the dawn of August 20, they reached the waters of the besieged city.

== Battle of Tarragona ==
The French fleet, composed of 14 galleons, 13 pataches, 17 galleys, and 3 fireships, was soon put on line and opened fire on the Spanish fleet. Sourdis' vice-admiral was ahead with 6 ships and 5 galleys, Sourdis followed him with 11 ships and 7 galleys, while 12 ships and 5 galleys closed the formation. Sourdis sailed towards the Point of Salou, attempting to bar the way to Maqueda. The Spaniards immediately responded to the fire with their galleons, causing serious damage to the French galleons, and forcing the French fleet to leave the harbor entrance. With the blockade broken, and the French fleet engaged in battle with the Spanish galleons, the Spanish convoy of 65 ships, escorted by some Spanish galleys, entered the port, to the great joy of the defenders. Having achieved the main objective, the Spanish galleys were reorganized and attacked the flank of the French fleet. At the same time, Maqueda fell upon the French vanguard supported by his galleons. In the middle of the action, the ship under Admiral Orellana lost its mainsail and had to be relieved by the Testa de Oro. The French galleons Forte and Licorne were put out of action, but Sourdis did not lose a single ship. Having managed to hold off a superior fleet, he ordered the withdrawal on 25 August. But although he had saved his whole fleet, the Spaniards had obtained the naval control of the area. The siege of Tarragona was lifted, and the Spanish fleet was able to provision the towns of Roses, Perpignan, and Collioure.

== Consequences ==
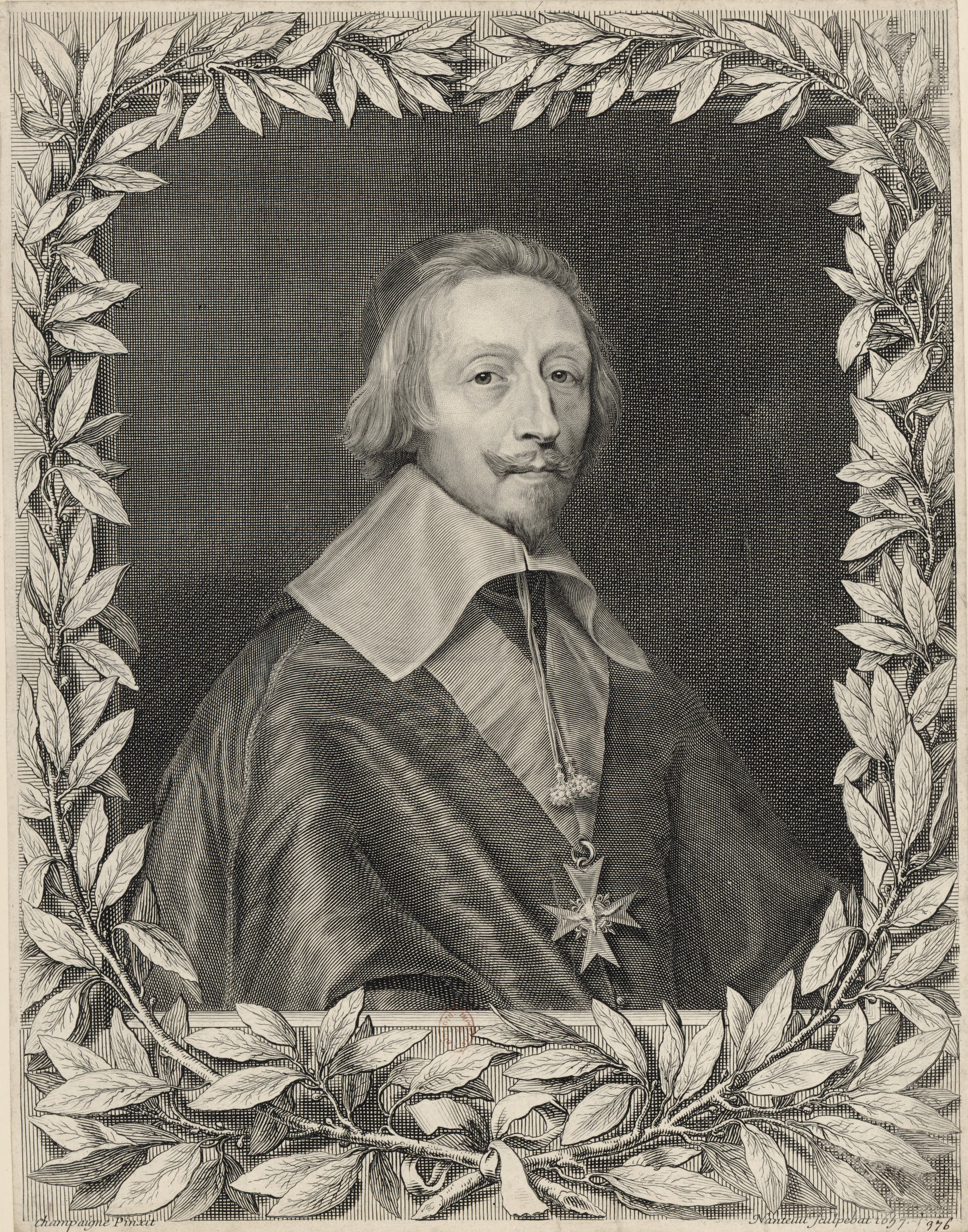
Cardinal Richelieu by Robert Nanteuil.

In France, the powerful minister of Louis XIII, Cardinal Richelieu, angered by the defeat, deprived Sourdis of his office and replaced him with the young naval officer Jean Armand de Maillé-Brézé. In Spain, in spite of his success, Don García de Toledo, Duke of Fernandina, was also deprived of his charge. The Count-Duke of Olivares felt dissatisfied because Fernandina had not destroyed the French fleet and imprisoned him. The case was truly unusual: the two admirals, both the victor and the vanquished, had the same bitter reward. However, the ostracism of the French Admiral was final, while the Spanish Admiral was soon restored after the fall of Olivares in 1643. Fernandina was put back in charge and even became part of the Council of the King of Spain. Regarding Sourdis' disgrace, the Spanish admiral Gianettino Doria said: "Would to Heaven that I had made a similar retreat, my fortune would be made forever." He was impressed by how Sourdis had fought off a fleet four times superior in numbers and had retired without the loss of a single vessel. But the war continued, and the following year, a new Spanish fleet organized at Cádiz to relieve the isolated garrisons of Roses and Collioure, was prevented from doing so by Jean Armand de Maillé-Brézé in the Battle of Barcelona (1642), which sealed the loss of Perpignan to France shortly afterwards.
