= García de Toledo Osorio, 6th Marquess of Villafranca =

Spanish noble (1579-1649)

García de Toledo Osorio
- Born: 25 April 1579; Naples
- Died: 21 January 1649 (aged 69); Madrid
- Occupations: Spanish nobleman, Military, Grandee of Spain
- Spouse: María de Mendoza

García Álvarez de Toledo Osorio, 6th Marquess of Villafranca (25 April 1579 in Naples – 21 January 1649 in Madrid), Prince of Montalbano, 3rd Duke of Fernandina was a Spanish nobleman, military and a Grandee of Spain. He and his brother Fadrique were prolific admirals.

== Biography ==
He was the son of Pedro de Toledo Osorio, 5th Marquess of Villafranca, and Elvira de Mendoza.
As a child he was already Trece (thirteen) in the Order of Santiago, Prince of Montalbano and Duke of Fernandina.

He joined the navy in 1606 on a galley under the command of his father and in 1623 became Captain General of the Galleys of Spain. The following year, at the head of ten galleys near Cádiz, he captured five Algerian galleons, compensating skillfully the inferiority of his flotilla by taking his enemies' sterns and boarding them safely.

He later participated in the successful Defense of Cadiz against the English in 1625, and won a victory against France when he conquered the Lérins Islands in 1636.

During the Catalan Revolt, in 1641 he won the important Battla of Tarragona against the French fleet under Henri de Sourdis, thus lifting the siege of the city.

He was Captain General of the Council of State and Council of War of King Philip IV of Spain, becoming one of his most trusted men. However, the King's Valido, Count-Duke of Olivares, deposed him from office and locked him up in the castle of Villaviciosa de Odón in 1633. After the fall of Olivares, Garcia was reinstated in all his functions and he was given 400,000 ducats as a compensation for having been punished unjustly.

However, the imprisonment he endured and the treatment he received caused him to lose his previously displayed enthusiasm. He requested to be discharged from active service, a request the Monarch denied twice. Finally, he was replaced by the Duke of Tursi in command of the Spanish galleys, and he was granted a position as a State Councilor, an honorable retirement for the last years of his life.

== Family ==
On 18 August 1609 he married María de Mendoza, daughter of Ana de Mendoza y Enríquez de Cabrera, 6th Duchess of the Infantado. They had no children. He was succeeded by his nephew Fadrique Álvarez de Toledo, son of his brother Fadrique de Toledo, 1st Marquess of Valdueza.

== Bibliography ==
- Fernández Duro, Cesáreo (1898). Armada Española, desde la unión de los reinos de Castilla y Aragón, tomo IV. Instituto de Historia Naval.

Spanish nobility
Preceded by Pedro de Toledo Osorio	Marquess of Villafranca del Bierzo; 1627-1649	Succeeded by Fadrique de Toledo Osorio
Preceded by Pedro de Toledo Osorio	Duke of Fernandina; 1627-1649	Succeeded by Fadrique de Toledo Osorio
