= Kenjalgad =

Fort in Wai, Maharashtra, India

Kenjalgad Fort
- Satara District, Maharashtra, India
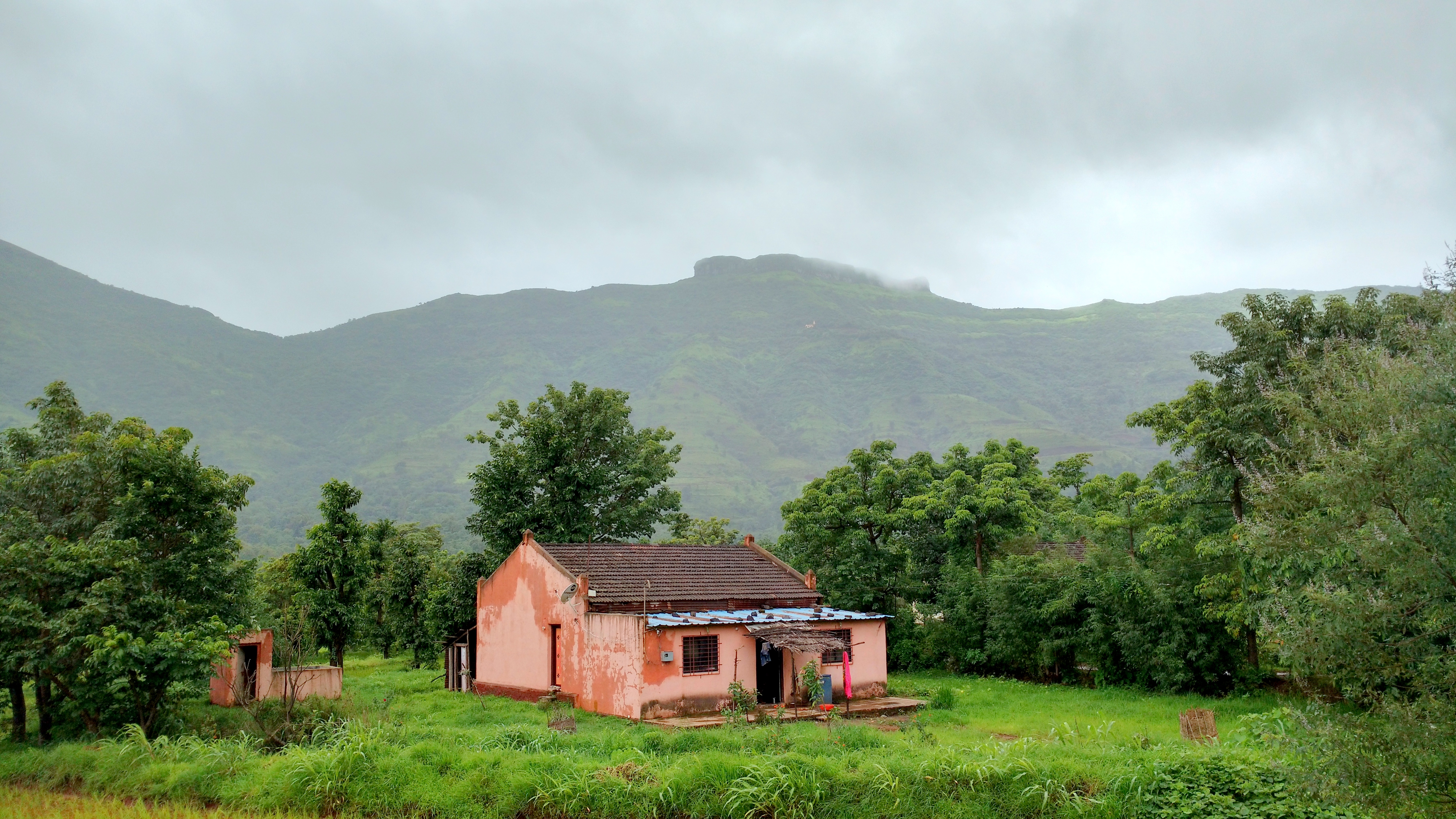
- Kenjalgad fort from Korle village

Site information
- Type: Hill fort
- Owner: Government of India
- Controlled by: Forest Dept.
- Open to the public: Yes
- Condition: Ruins

Location
- India
- Coordinates: 18°32′9″N 72°54′29″E
- Height: 4269 feet

Site history
- Built: Bhoj Raja of Panhala
- Materials: Stone

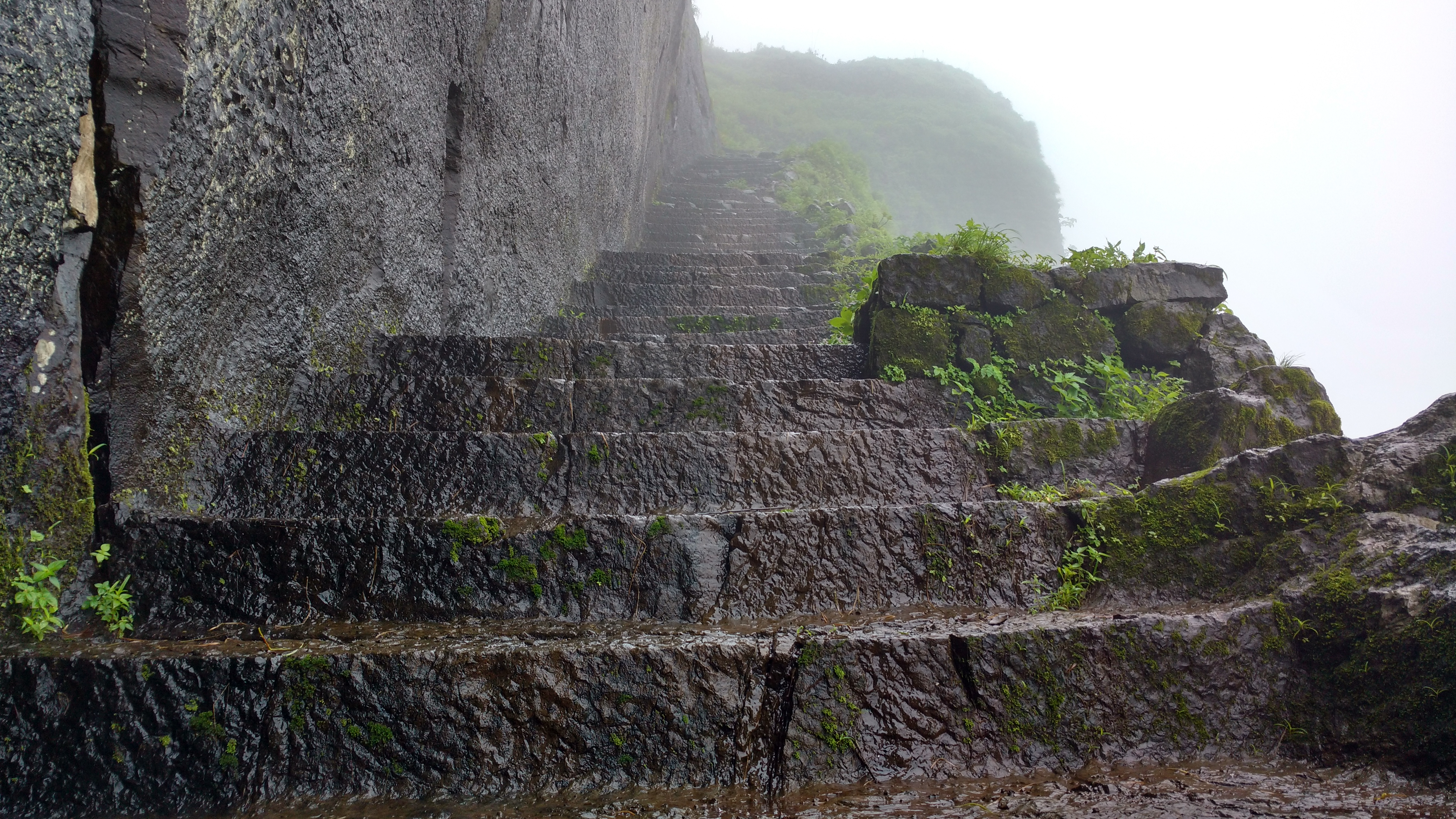
Rock cut steps

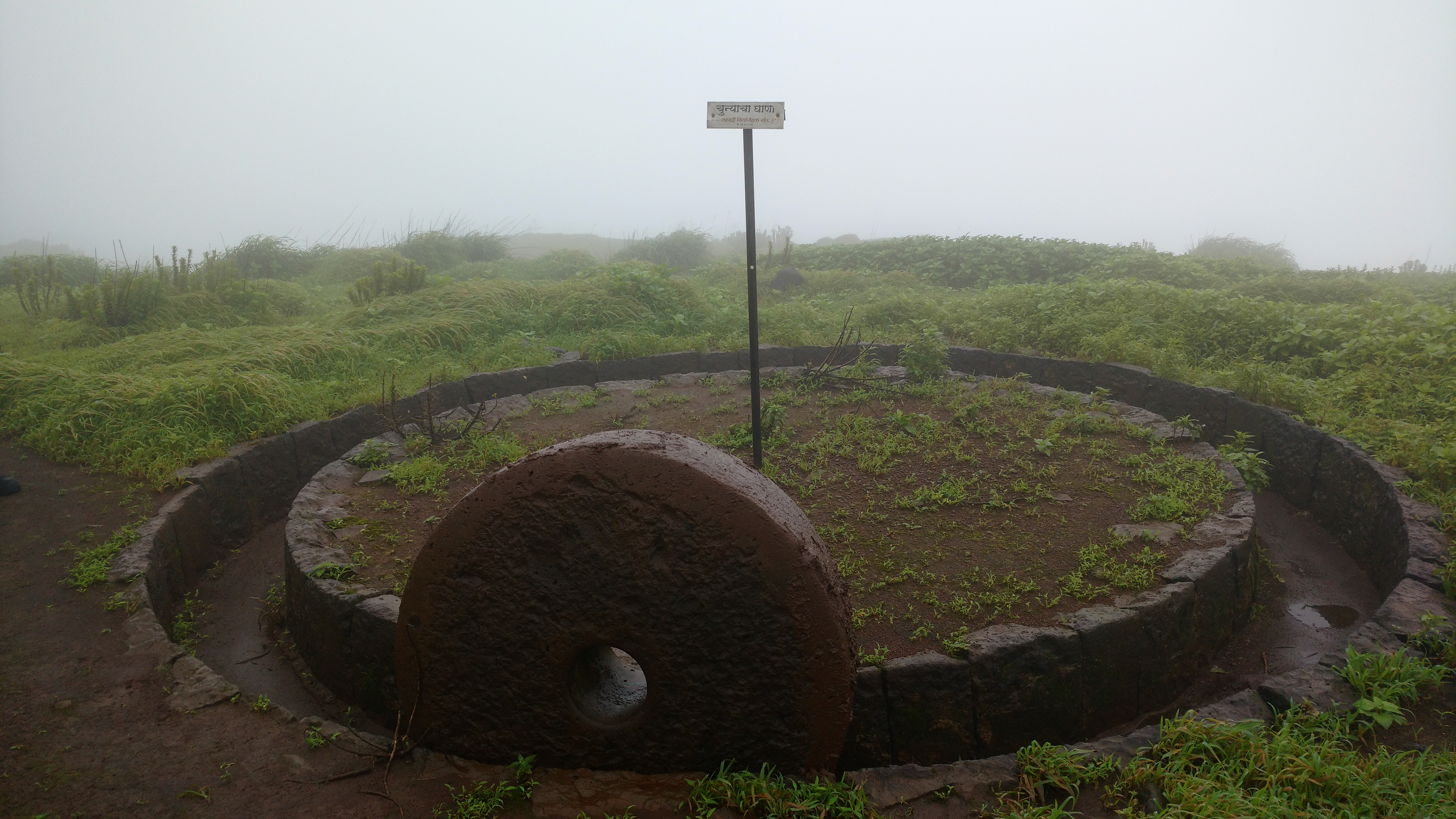
Lime mixer

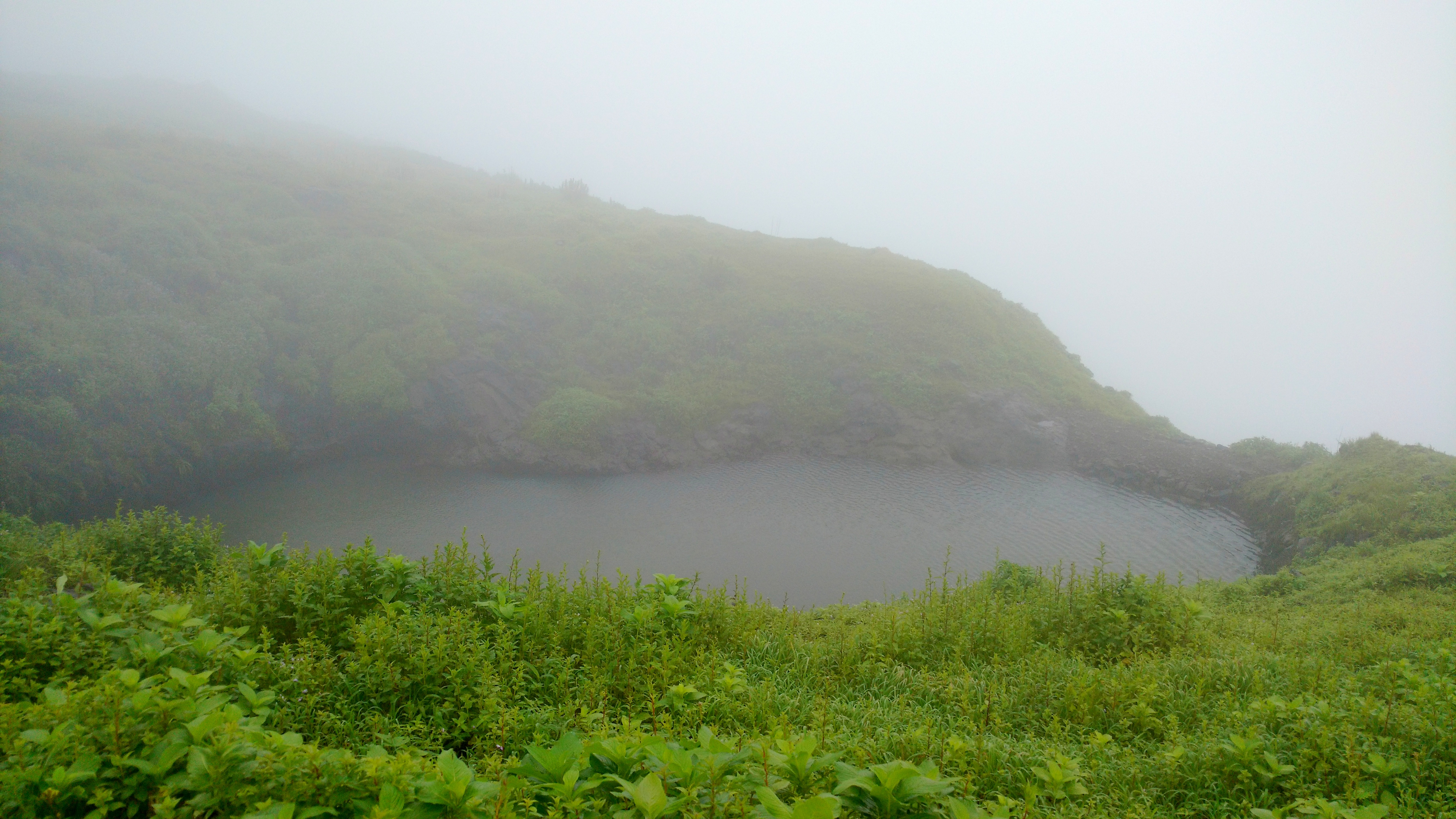
Water tank

Kenjalgad Fort (also called Ghera Khelanja Fort) in Wai, Maharashtra is a fort eleven miles (18 km) north-west of Wai. It is located on the Mandhardev spur of the Mahadev hill range. The fort is visible from quite a long distance as a stone scarp 30–40 feet high rising as a cap on the irregular hill. The fort is rhomboid in shape with 388m long axis and 175m short axis.

== History ==
This fort is said to have been built by Bhoja II of Panhala who flourished in the 12th century. This fort was won by Adilshah of Bijapur in 1648. The Chhatrapati Shivaji Maharaj had captured all the forts in Wai and Bhor region but, he was not able to win this fort till 1674. He captured this fort as an amazing movement while he was on a military campaign at Chiplun. He along with soldiers marched to the Kenjalgad and captured the fort by surprise. The garrison head, Gangaji Vishwasrao Kirdat was killed in the ambush and the fort was captured on 24 April 1674. This fort was captured by Aurangzeb in 1701. In the subsequent year i.e. 1702 this fort was captured by Maratha Army infantry leader Pilaji Gole. After the fall of Peshwa this fort was captured by British under the detachment sent by Gen. Pritzler on 26 March 1818.

== How to reach ==
The fort can be reached by road from Wai 25 km (16 mi)or from Bhor 17 km (11 mi). There are mainly two trek routes to the fort. The path starting from the col joining Raireshwar plateau and the Kenjalgad takes about an hour to reach the fort. The nearest route starts from the base village-Ghera Kenjal. It takes about half an hour to reach the top of the fort. The trek path passes through forest area and reaches the southern tip of the hill. This is followed by walking along the eastern side of the scarp. Finally, there are 55 odd nicely carved, rock-cut steps on the eastern side of the fort which lead to the top of the fort. The fort is accessible in all seasons of the year, however in the rainy season, the fort is covered with monsoon clouds. This leads to poor visibility and stormy winds. There is no water available on the trek route or the fort. A night halt can be done in the temple at the base village.

== Places to see ==
The fort is very small size plateau. The main entrance was ruined while the fort was dismantled by the British. There is a small magazine room, with no roof. The Kacheri or Sadar is in ruined form. The idols of Kenjai devi are also seen on the fort. There are two lime mixers with mortar stone in good condition. There were three large and six small water tanks on the fort. After the fort was captured by the British, they blew up the walls of the tanks and let the water drain out of the tanks. There are no live spring on the fort.

== See also ==
- Shivaji
- List of forts in Maharashtra
- Satara district
