= Jorge de Cárdenas y Manrique de Lara, 4th Duke of Maqueda =

Spanish noble

Jorge de Cárdenas y Manrique de Lara (April 23, 1584 – October 30, 1644), 4th Duke of Maqueda and 6th Duke of Nájera, was a Spanish noble, military and statesman, born in Elche.

He was the son of Bernardino de Cárdenas y Portugal, 3rd Duke of Maqueda, 2nd Marquis of Elche, and of Luisa Manrique de Lara, 5th Duchess of Nájera.

He inherited the titles of his father in 1601, and also the title of Duke of Nájera, which was held by his mother. He was a Grandee of Spain.

In that year 1601 he was also interim Viceroy of Sicily.

Between 1616 and 1625, he was Governor of Oran and Mazalquivir.

Then he was made Captain General of the Armada and member of the State Council by King Philip IV of Spain.

In Augustus 1641, Cardenas received the command of a Spanish fleet to lift the blockade of Tarragona and with which he won the Battle of Tarragona (August 1641) against the French.

In November 1641, he was chosen to lead a squadron from Cadiz to intercept a Dutch fleet, but his command was disputed by the Governor of that city Juan Alonso Idiáquez, 2nd Duke of Ciudad Real. It apparently came to a duel between the two men, in which Cardenas was wounded. Idiaquez took command of the fleet and won the Battle of Cape St. Vincent (1641). Both men were punished by King Philip IV for the duel.

He married in 1633 with Isabel de la Cueva y Enriquez de Cabrera, daughter of Francisco Fernández de la Cueva, 7th Duke of Alburquerque, but they had no children. He was succeeded by his younger brother Jaime Manuel de Cárdenas y Manrique de Lara.

== Sources ==
- Todo avante
- Ducado de Maqueda.

Government offices
Preceded by Bernardino de Cárdenas y Portugal	Viceroy of Sicily; 1601–1602	Succeeded by Lorenzo Suárez de Figueroa y Córdoba
Spanish nobility
Preceded by Bernardino de Cárdenas y Portugal	Duke of Maqueda; 1601–1644	Succeeded by Jaime de Cárdenas y Manrique de Lara
