= Messina revolt =

1672–78 revolt against the patrician government of Messina

- Part of Franco-Dutch War
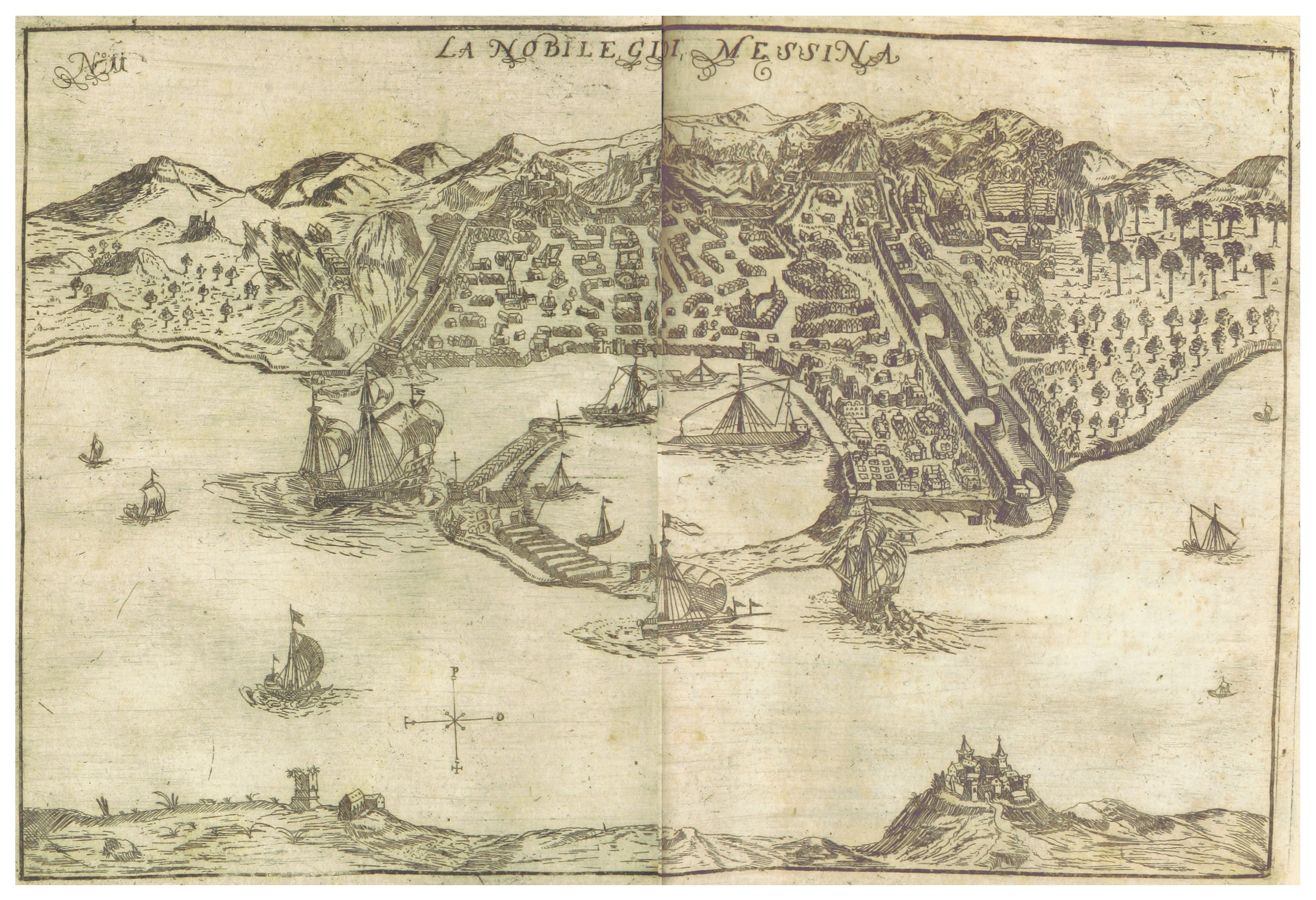
- Messina in 1681
| Date | 1672–1678 |
| Location | Messina, Sicily 38.18°N 15.55°E |
| Status | Spanish control restored |
| Territorial changes | Messina temporarily independent (1674–1678) |

Belligerents
| Kingdom of France (Sicily) City of Messina | Kingdom of Spain; Dutch Republic (1676) |

Commanders and leaders
| (Kingdom of France) Louis Victor de Rochechouart de Mortemart (Kingdom of France) Jean-Baptiste de Valbelle (Kingdom of France) François-Auguste de Valavoire (Kingdom of France) Anne Hilarion de Tourville (Kingdom of France) Abraham Duquesne | (Spain) Luis de Hojo Crispano (Spain) Melchor de la Cueva (Dutch Republic) (Spain) Michiel de Ruyter |

Units involved
| French Navy; French land forces | Spanish Army; Spanish Navy; Dutch Navy (1676) |

Strength
| Up to 20 French warships Small land force | 22 Spanish ships 19 galleys Spanish army Dutch-Spanish fleet (1676) |
- The revolt began as an anti-patrician uprising in 1672, but evolved into a revolt against Spanish rule with French support. Messina was independent until the end of the Franco-Dutch War (1672–78).
- Location of Messina in Italy

The Messina revolt of 1672–78 began with a revolt against the patrician government of Messina on the island of Sicily by skilled workers in 1672. When the patricians regained control in 1674 they turned the movement into a revolt against Spanish rule. They obtained support from the French, and Messina was independent until the end of the Franco-Dutch War of 1672–78, when the Spanish regained control.

== Initial revolt ==
The city of Messina had a population of 120,000 in the mid-17th century, with the city council dominated by a few patrician families. The Spanish government granted Messina a monopoly on the export of silk in 1663, but after loud protests from other ports of Sicily withdrew it the next year. There were no immediate disturbances, but the nobility and upper bourgeoisie of the city became hostile to the Spanish. The Spanish captain-general Luis de Hojo conceived the plan of turning the common people against the upper classes through a display of charity and devotion, and through engineering an artificial shortage for which the senate of the city would be blamed. The artisan workers threw out the patricians in 1672, but did not dispute Spanish rule. The Prince de Ligne, Viceroy of Sicily, was alarmed by the disturbances, and had Hojo removed. When the disturbances continued and there was talk of using force against the rebels, Ligne also resigned.

== Revolt against Spain ==
On 7 July 1674 the trades companies united with the patricians in a revolt against the Spanish, and besieged Captain-General Crispano in his palace. They drove out the Spanish garrison and gained control of almost all of the city. Four of the five forts were taken. Messina sent deputies to the French ambassador in Rome and to Admiral Louis Victor de Rochechouart de Mortemart, Compte de Vivonne, on the coast of Catalonia.

On 27 September 1674 Vivonne sent Jean-Baptiste de Valbelle to help the rebels with a convoy of supply vessels guarded by a squadron of seven warships and three fire ships. Valbelle took advantage of the tide and a stern wind to speed through the channel, past the galleys and into the city, bringing enough provisions for about five weeks. Valbelle helped the Messinese expel the Spanish from the last fort, the Faro at the harbour entrance. Lacking sufficient provisions and land forces to act against the Spanish, he left to ask for more effective assistance.

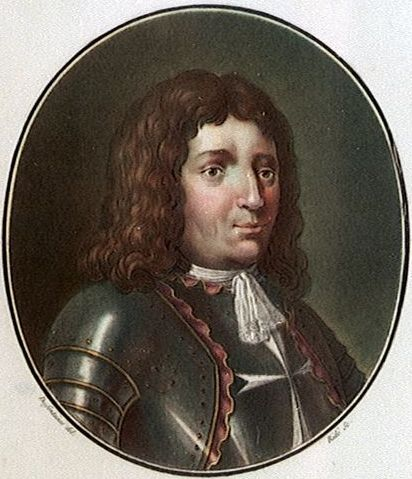
Jean-Baptiste de Valbelle

On 1 January 1675 Valbelle's squadron returned, bringing a small corps of land forces under Lieutenant-General Valavoire^{(fr)}. The French minister of foreign affairs, the Marquis de Pomponne, had instructed Vallavoire to encourage the people of Messina to form an independent republic, unless they wanted to become part of France or to accept as ruler a prince designated by Louis XIV. When they arrived on 2 January 1675 the Spanish army was camped outside the city, had retaken some of the forts and seemed to be about to take the city. The Spanish had a fleet of 22 ships and 19 galleys cruising at the entrance to the Strait of Messina. Valbelle, with six warships and three fire ships, boldly attempted the passage and entered the port unharmed on 8 January. Although the Spanish troops withdrew some distance from the city, Valavoire did not have the resources to advance inland, and provisions soon ran low again.

Vivonne sent another squadron under Capitaine de Tourville. He joined Valbelle, but together they were still not strong enough to attack the Spanish Admiral Melchor de la Cueva's force of 15 sailing warships and 15 galleys. Vivonne himself arrived on 11 February 1675 with eight warships and three fireships. The French fleet now had 20 sailing warships, of which nine were ships of the line. The French easily defeated the Spanish in the Battle of the Lipari Islands, and captured the 44-gun frigate Nuestra Señora del Pueblo. Vivonne was now able to sail into Messina, delivering large quantities of food. In the remainder of 1675 the French increased their strength in Sicily and along the southern coast of Italy. In 1676, Michiel de Ruyter in command of a combined Dutch fleet, with one Spanish warship attached, which was intended to blockade Messina fought a French fleet, under Abraham Duquesne, at the indecisive battle of Stromboli in January 1676 and, under a Spanish admiral in command of a Dutch-Spanish fleet, commanded the leading squadron at the Battle of Augusta in April that. At Augusta, de Ruyter was fatally wounded; the combined fleet suffered more casualties than the French, and was forced to withdraw from Messina. However, despite frustrating Dutch–Spanish fleet's blockade, the bulk of the French fleet was recalled to France later in the year, and the French evacuated their troops from Messina early in 1678.

== Return to Spain ==
On 10 January 1678 England and the United Provinces signed a treaty of alliance at the Hague. Louis XIV saw that he could not compete at sea with the combined Anglo-Dutch forces and decided to withdraw from Sicily, which he had never seen as more than a distraction. He sent François d'Aubusson de La Feuillade from Toulon with Duquesne's fleet, ostensibly to replace Vivonne as viceroy in Sicily but in fact to evacuate the French troops. La Feuillade had himself proclaimed viceroy with great pomp on 28 February 1678. On 13 March 1678 he embarked the French troops on the pretence of an expedition against Palermo. He then informed the Messinese jurats that the French were leaving for good. A few hundred leading families were allowed to embark before the fleet left. The Spanish viceroy returned to Messina without opposition, having promised a general amnesty, a promise that was not kept.

== Sources ==
- Blackmore, David S.T. (2011-03-22), Warfare on the Mediterranean in the Age of Sail: A History, 1571–1866, McFarland, ISBN 978-0-7864-5784-7
- Encyclopédie Méthodique, Ou Par Ordre De Matieres: Par Une Société De Gens De Lettres, De Savants Et D'Artistes (in French), vol. 6, Panckoucke, 1804
- Ganse, Alexander (2004), "Messina Revolt, 1672-1678", World History at KMLA
- Martin, Henri (1865), Martin's History of France: The Age of Louis XIV, Translated by Mary Louise Booth, Walker, Wise and Company
- Ribot, Luis (1982), La revuelta antiespanola de Mesina. Causas y antecedentes (1591-1674), Valladolid: Universidad de Valladolid, Facultad de Filosofia y Letras
