= 1640 =

1640 in various calendars
- Gregorian calendar: 1640; MDCXL
- Ab urbe condita: 2393
- Armenian calendar: 1089; ԹՎ ՌՁԹ
- Assyrian calendar: 6390
- Balinese saka calendar: 1561–1562
- Bengali calendar: 1046–1047
- Berber calendar: 2590
- English Regnal year: 15 Cha. 1 – 16 Cha. 1
- Buddhist calendar: 2184
- Burmese calendar: 1002
- Byzantine calendar: 7148–7149
- Chinese calendar: 己卯年 (Earth Rabbit); 4337 or 4130 — to — 庚辰年 (Metal Dragon); 4338 or 4131
- Coptic calendar: 1356–1357
- Discordian calendar: 2806
- Ethiopian calendar: 1632–1633
- Hebrew calendar: 5400–5401
- Hindu calendars
- Vikram Samvat: 1696–1697
- Shaka Samvat: 1561–1562
- Kali Yuga: 4740–4741
- Holocene calendar: 11640
- Igbo calendar: 640–641
- Iranian calendar: 1018–1019
- Islamic calendar: 1049–1050
- Japanese calendar: Kan'ei 17 (寛永１７年)
- Javanese calendar: 1561–1562
- Julian calendar: Gregorian minus 10 days
- Korean calendar: 3973
- Minguo calendar: 272 before ROC 民前272年
- Nanakshahi calendar: 172
- Thai solar calendar: 2182–2183
- Tibetan calendar: ས་མོ་ཡོས་ལོ་ (female Earth-Hare); 1766 or 1385 or 613 — to — ལྕགས་ཕོ་འབྲུག་ལོ་ (male Iron-Dragon); 1767 or 1386 or 614

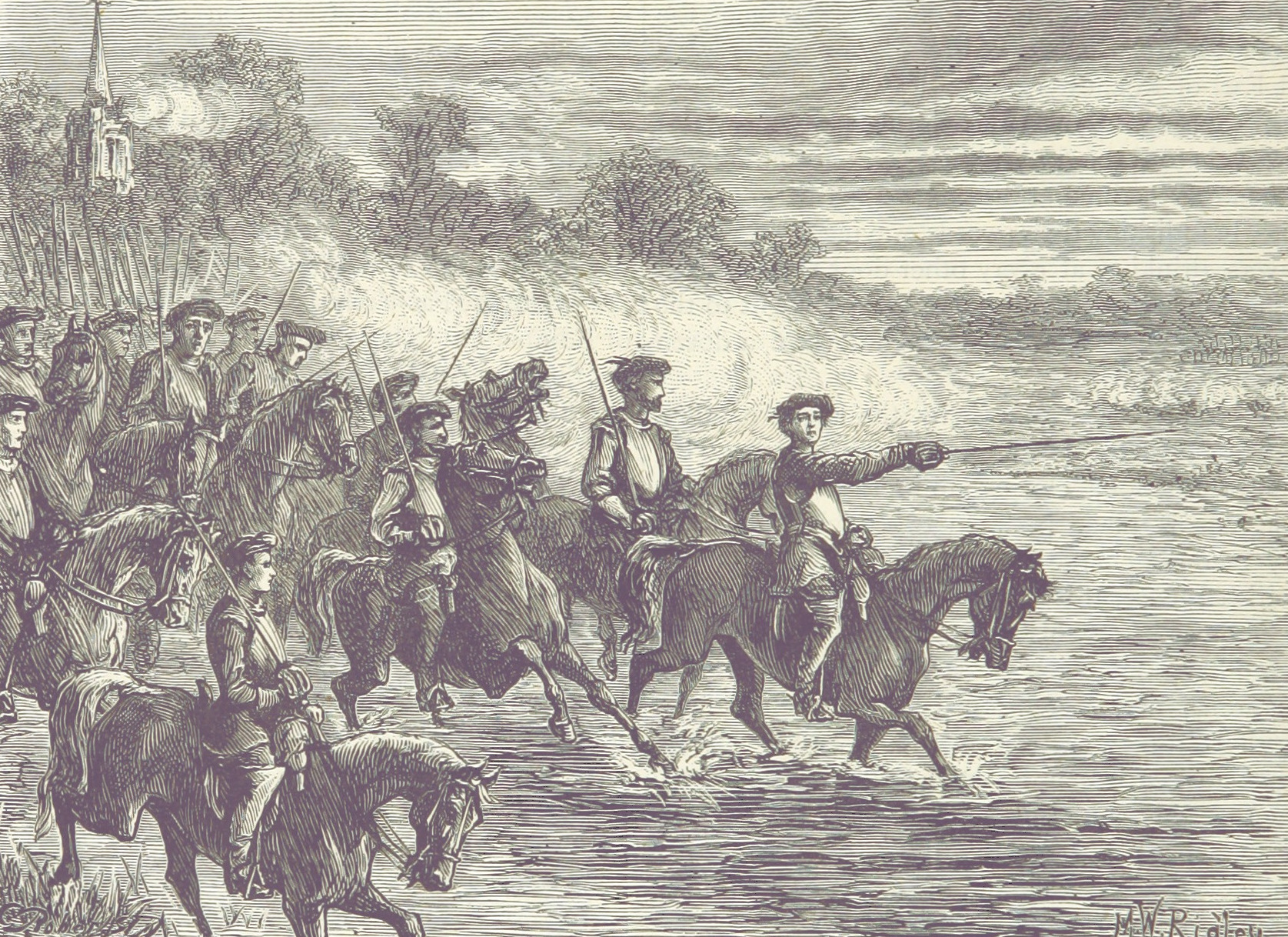
August 28: the Battle of Newburn

1640 (MDCXL) was a leap year starting on Sunday of the Gregorian calendar and a leap year starting on Wednesday of the Julian calendar, the 1640th year of the Common Era (CE) and Anno Domini (AD) designations, the 640th year of the 2nd millennium, the 40th year of the 17th century, and the 1st year of the 1640s decade. As of the start of 1640, the Gregorian calendar was 10 days ahead of the Julian calendar, which remained in localized use until 1923.

== Events ==
=== January–March ===
- January 6 – The Siege of Salses in Catalonia ends almost six months after it had started on June 9, 1639, with the French defenders surrendering to the Spanish attackers.
- January 17 – Action of 12–17 January 1640: A naval battle, part of the Dutch invasions of Brazil, between ships of the Dutch Republic and those of the Kingdom of Portugal, ends after five days of fighting with the Dutch driving the Portuguese away from the port of Recife.
- February 9 – Ibrahim I succeeds his brother Murad IV (r. 1623–1640) as Sultan of the Ottoman Empire; he will rule until his death in 1648.
- March 8–13 – Siege of Galle: Dutch troops take the strategic fortress at Galle, Sri Lanka from the Portuguese.

=== April–June ===
- April 13 – The Short Parliament assembles, as King Charles I of England attempts to fund the second of the Bishops' Wars.
- May 5 – The Short Parliament is dissolved without agreeing to the King's demands.
- May 11/12 – Following the Short Parliament's dissolution, an angry and armed mob makes an attack on Lambeth Palace in London in the hope of killing the unpopular Archbishop William Laud.
- May 22 – The Reapers' War (Guerra dels Segadors or Catalan Revolt) breaks out in Catalonia.
- June 7 – Catalan rebels assassinate Dalmau de Queralt, Count of Santa Coloma, beginning the three-day Corpus de Sang riots.
- June 13 – The eruption of the Hokkaido Koma-ga-take (Mount Komagatake) volcano takes place in Japan. Although the eruption causes few direct injuries, the heavy ashfall poisons local crops and causes the Kan'ei Great Famine that causes more than 50,000 deaths from starvation.

=== July–September ===
- July 9 – John Punch, a servant of Virginia planter Hugh Gwyn, is sentenced to a life of servitude after attempting to escape, making him the "first official slave in the English colonies".
- July 15 – The first university of Finland, the Royal Academy of Turku, is inaugurated in Turku.
- August 9 – Forty-one Spanish delegates to Japan at Nagasaki are beheaded.
- August 20 – Second Bishops' War: A Scottish Covenanter army invades Northumberland in England.
- August 28 – Second Bishops' War: Battle of Newburn – The Scottish Covenanter army led by Alexander Leslie defeats the English army near Newburn in England.
- September 7 – Portuguese missionary Sebastien Manrique reaches Dhaka and stays for 27 days, leaving on October 4.
- September 20 – The Siege of Turin (began May 22) ends in Italy with the French and Piedmontese recapturing the city from Spain.

=== October–December ===
- October 26 – The Treaty of Ripon is signed, restoring peace between the Scottish Covenanters and Charles I of England.
- November 3 – The English Long Parliament is summoned; it will not be dissolved for 20 years.
- December 1
  - The end of the Iberian Union of Spain and Portugal begins, as a revolution organized by the nobility and bourgeoisie causes John IV of Portugal to be acclaimed as king, thus ending 60 years of personal union of the crowns of Portugal and Spain, and the rule of the House of Habsburg (also called the Philippine Dynasty). The Spanish Habsburgs do not recognize Portugal's new dynasty, the House of Braganza, until the end of the Portuguese Restoration War in 1668.
  - Frederick William, Elector of Brandenburg begins to rule.

=== Date unknown ===
- The first book to be printed in North America (the Bay Psalm Book) is published.
- The first known European coffeehouse perhaps opens in Venice.

== Births ==
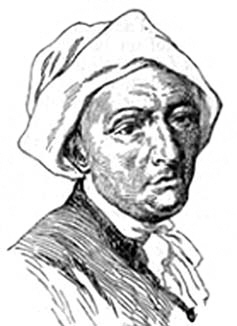
Philippe de La Hire

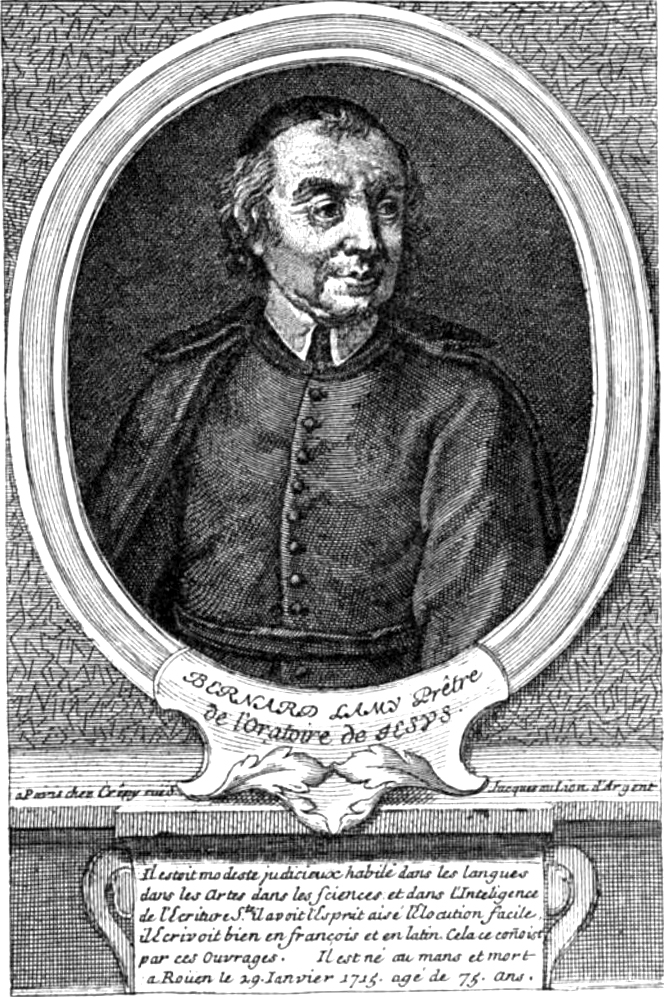
Bernard Lamy

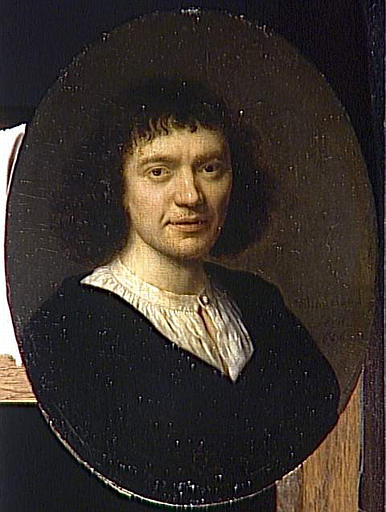
Pieter Cornelisz van Slingelandt

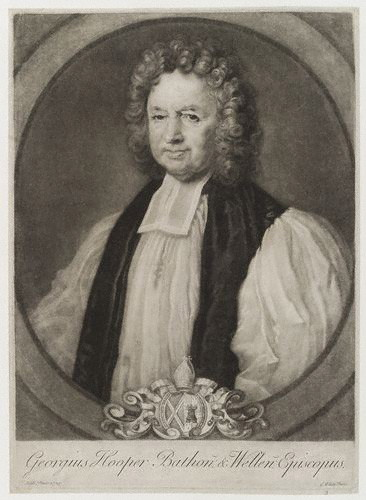
George Hooper

=== January–March ===
- January 5 – Paolo Lorenzani, Italian composer (d. 1713)
- January 8
  - Joaquín Canaves, Spanish Catholic bishop (d. 1721)
  - Elisabeth Dorothea of Saxe-Gotha-Altenburg, German princess (d. 1709)
- January 10 – Élie Benoist, French Protestant minister (d. 1728)
- January 11 – Sir Robert Burdett, 3rd Baronet, English politician (d. 1716)
- January 17 – Jonathan Singletary Dunham, prominent early American settler of Woodbridge Township (d. 1724)
- January 23 – Philipp von Hörnigk, German economist (d. 1714)
- January 25 – William Cavendish, 1st Duke of Devonshire, English soldier and statesman (d. 1707)
- January 31 – Samuel Willard, American theologian (d. 1707)
- February 6 – William Campion, English politician (d. 1702)
- February 13 – Richard Edgcumbe, English politician (d. 1688)
- February 14 – Countess Palatine Anna Magdalena of Birkenfeld-Bischweiler, Countess of Hanau-Lichtenberg (d. 1693)
- February 17 – Olivier Morel de La Durantaye, French military officer (d. 1716)
- February 20 – Pierre II Mignard, French architect and painter (d. 1725)
- February 24
  - Charles-René d'Hozier, French historical commentator (d. 1732)
  - Michiel ten Hove, interim Grand Pensionary of Holland (1688, 1689) (d. 1689)
- February 29
  - Elisabeth Charlotte, Countess of Holzappel (d. 1707)
  - Benjamin Keach, English Particular Baptist preacher (d. 1704)
- March 6 – Marcantonio Barbarigo, Italian Catholic cardinal (d. 1706)
- March 7 – Maria Theresa van Thielen, Flemish Baroque painter (d. 1706)
- March 9 – Jacques d'Agar, French painter (d. 1715)
- March 18 – Philippe de La Hire, French mathematician and astronomer (d. 1718)

=== April–June ===
- April 1
  - Sigismund Casimir, Crown Prince of Poland (d. 1647)
  - Georg Mohr, Danish mathematician (d. 1697)
- April 4 – Gaspar Sanz, Spanish composer, musician, priest (d. 1710)
- April 6 – Thomas Lloyd, Quaker preacher of provincial Pennsylvania (d. 1694)
- April 7 – Ludmilla Elisabeth of Schwarzburg-Rudolstadt, German Countess and hymn poet (d. 1672)
- April 18 – Étienne Chauvin, French Protestant divine (d. 1725)
- April 22 – Mariana Alcoforado, Portuguese nun (d. 1723)
- April 23 – Wolfgang William Romer, Dutch military engineer (d. 1713)
- April 26 – Frederick, Count of Nassau-Weilburg, ruling Count of Nassau-Weilburg (1655-1675) (d. 1675)
- April 30 – Nicolas Letourneux, French preacher, ascetical writer (d. 1686)
- May 31 – Michał Korybut Wiśniowiecki, King of Poland (d. 1673)
- June 5 – Pu Songling, Qing Dynasty Chinese writer (d. 1715)
- June 9 – Leopold I, Holy Roman Emperor (d. 1705)
- June 15 – Bernard Lamy, French Oratorian mathematician and theologian (d. 1715)
- June 16 – Jacques Ozanam, French mathematician (d. 1718)
- June 19 – Thomas Widdrington, English politician (d. 1660)
- June 21 – Abraham Mignon, Dutch golden age painter (d. 1679)
- June 29 – Elizabeth Stanhope, Countess of Chesterfield, second wife of Philip Stanhope (d. 1665)

=== July–September ===
- July 8 – Henry Stuart, Duke of Gloucester, son of Charles I (d. 1660)
- July 20 – Johannes Bohn, German physician (d. 1718)
- August 2 – Gérard Audran, French engraver (d. 1703)
- August 8 – Amalia Catharina, German poet and musician (d. 1697)
- September 7 – Johann Jacob Schütz, German lawyer (d. 1690)
- September 8 – Jérôme de Gonnelieu, French Jesuit theologian (d. 1715)
- September 21 – Philippe I, Duke of Orléans, younger son of Louis XIII of France and his wife (d. 1701)
- September 23 – Date Tsunamune, Japanese daimyō of Sendai han (d. 1711)
- September 29 – Antoine Coysevox, French sculptor (d. 1720)

=== October–December ===
- October 11 – Louis Henry, Count Palatine of Simmern-Kaiserslautern, German noble (d. 1674)
- October 12 – Sir Roger Twisden, 2nd Baronet of England (d. 1703)
- October 18 – William Stanley, English Member of Parliament (d. 1670)
- October 20
  - Gérard Edelinck, Flemish engraver (d. 1707)
  - Pieter Cornelisz van Slingelandt, Dutch Golden Age painter (d. 1691)
- October 23 – Elisabeth Pepys, English wife of Samuel Pepys (d. 1669)
- October 25 – Johann Ludwig Hannemann, German chemist (d. 1724)
- October 28 – Streynsham Master, English colonial administrator (d. 1724)
- November 1 – Francisco de Benavides, Spanish viceroy (d. 1716)
- November 4 – Carlo Mannelli, Italian violinist, castrato and composer (d. 1697)
- November 5 – John Verney, 1st Viscount Fermanagh, British politician (d. 1717)
- November 14 – Jonathan Corwin, American judge of the Salem witch trials (d. 1718)
- November 15 – Nicolaus Adam Strungk, German composer and violinist (d. 1700)
- November 18 – George Hooper, Bishop of St Asaph
  Bishop of Bath and Wells (d. 1727)
- November 25 – Juan Domingo de Zuñiga y Fonseca, Spanish Governor of the Habsburg Netherlands (d. 1716)
- November 27 – Barbara Palmer, 1st Duchess of Cleveland (d. 1709)
- December 1 – Ercole Antonio Mattioli, Italian politician (d. 1694)
- December 6 – Claude Fleury, French ecclesiastical historian (d. 1723)
- December 13 – Robert Plot, English naturalist (d. 1696)
- December 14 (probable date) – Aphra Behn, English author (d. 1689)
- December 20 – Pierre Cureau de La Chambre, French churchman (d. 1693)
- December 22 – Inaba Masamichi, Japanese daimyō (d. 1716)
- December 25 – Julius Micrander, Swedish theologian (d. 1702)
- December 29 – William Feilding, 3rd Earl of Denbigh (d. 1685)

=== Date unknown ===
- Marguerite de la Sablière, French salonist and polymath (d. 1693)
- Catherine Monvoisin, French fortune teller and poisoner (d. 1680)

== Deaths ==
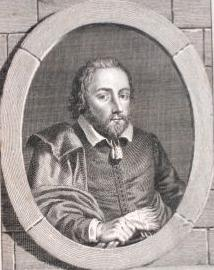
Philip Massinger

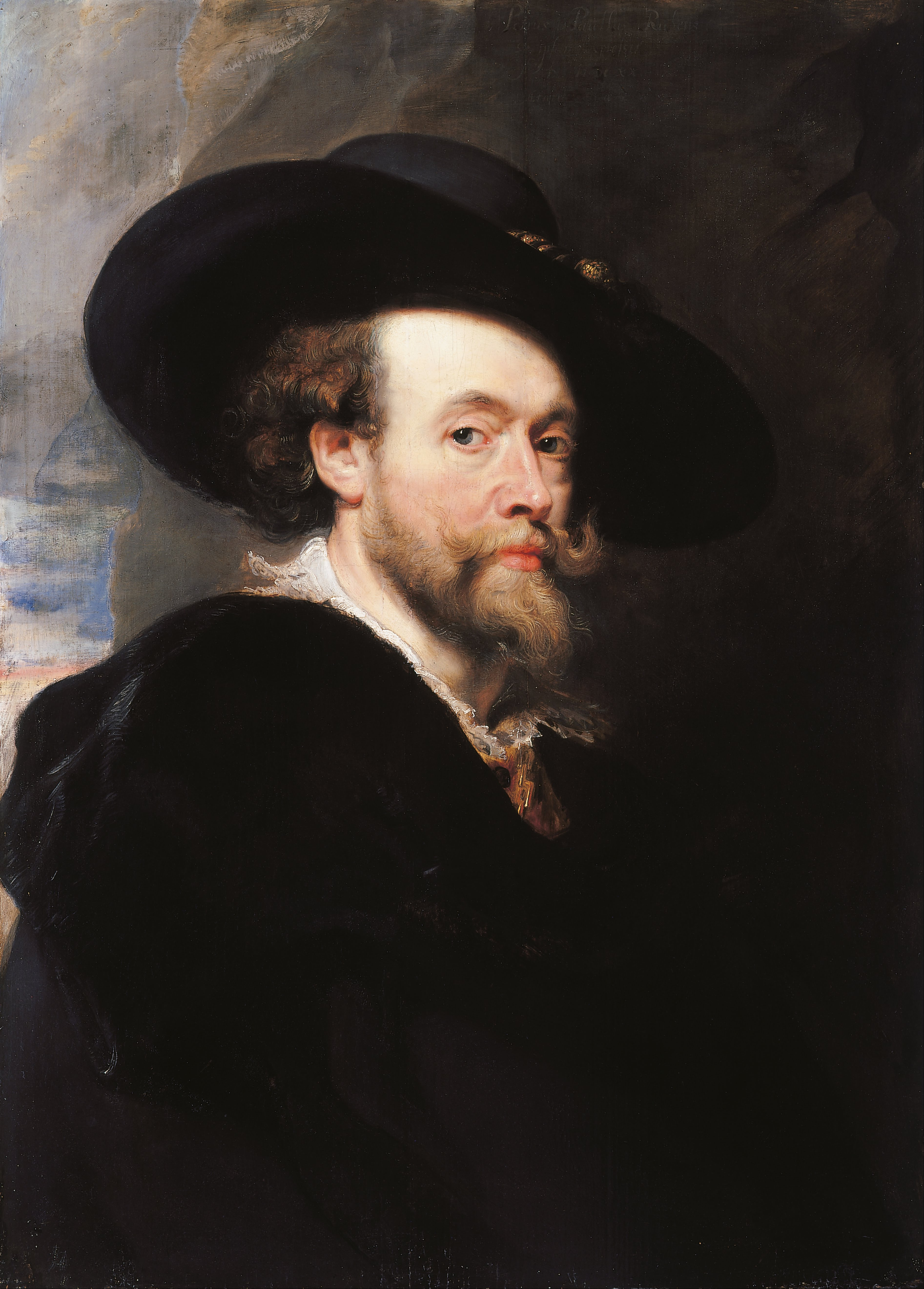
Peter Paul Rubens

- January 1 – Johann Wilhelm Baur, German artist (b. 1607)
- January 14 – Thomas Coventry, 1st Baron Coventry, English lawyer and judge (b. 1578)
- January 25 – Robert Burton, English scholar (b. 1577)
- January 26 – Jindřich Matyáš Thurn, Swedish general (b. 1567)
- February 2 – Jeanne de Lestonnac, French saint (b. 1556)
- February 9 – Murad IV, Ottoman Sultan (b. 1612)
- March 13 – Isaac Manasses de Pas, Marquis de Feuquieres, French soldier (b. 1590)
- March 17 – Philip Massinger, English dramatist (b. 1583)
- March 20 – Michael Reyniersz Pauw, Dutch businessman (b. 1590)
- April – Uriel da Costa, Portuguese philosopher (suicide) (b. 1585)
- April 2 – Paul Fleming, German physician and poet (b. 1609)
- April 5 – Petrus Kirstenius, German physician and orientalist (b. 1577)
- April 7 – Wilhelm Kettler, Duke of Courland (b. 1574)
- April 10 – Agostino Agazzari, Italian composer (b. 1578)
- April 16 – Countess Charlotte Flandrina of Nassau (b. 1579)
- May 29 – Elisabet Juliana Banér, Swedish noble (b. 1600)
- May 30 – Peter Paul Rubens, Flemish painter (b. 1577)
- May 31 – Zeynab Begum, Safavid princess (date of birth unknown)
- June 3 – Theophilus Howard, 2nd Earl of Suffolk, English politician (b. 1584)
- July 13 – Henry Casimir I of Nassau-Dietz, Stadtholder of Groningen, Friesland and Drenthe (b. 1612)
- July 25 – Fabio Colonna, Italian scientist (b. 1567)
- August 30 – Thomas Hamilton, 2nd Earl of Haddington, Scottish noble (b. 1600)
- September 10 – Anthony Abdy, English merchant (b. 1579)
- September 25 – Philippe-Charles, 3rd Count of Arenberg (b. 1587)
- September 30
  - Charles, Duke of Guise (b. 1571)
  - Jacopo da Empoli, Italian painter (b. 1551)
- October 1 – Claudio Achillini, Italian philosopher, theologian, mathematician, poet, jurist (b. 1574)
- October 6
  - Wolrad IV, Count of Waldeck-Eisenberg (b. 1588)
  - Christian Ulrik Gyldenløve, Danish diplomat and military officer (b. 1611)
- October 7 – Lord William Howard, English nobleman (b. 1563)
- October 19 – Aubert Miraeus, Belgian historian (b. 1573)
- October 20 – John Ball, English Puritan clergyman (b. 1585)
- November 5 – Anne of England, daughter of King Charles I (b. 1637)
- November 19 – Krzysztof Radziwiłł, Polish nobleman (b. 1585)
- November 22 – Mario Minniti, Italian artist (b. 1577)
- November 27 – Gabriel Gustafsson Oxenstierna, Swedish statesman (b. 1587)
- December 1
  - Pieter van den Broecke, Dutch merchant (b. 1585)
  - George William, Elector of Brandenburg (b. 1595)
  - Miguel de Vasconcelos, Portuguese prime minister (b. 1590)
- December 3 – Christopher Wandesford, English administrator and politician (b. 1592)
- December 15 – Willem Baudartius, Dutch theologian (b. 1565)
- December 22 – Claude de Bullion, French Minister of Finance (b. 1569)
- December 30 – John Francis Regis, French saint (b. 1597)
- December 31 – Ernest Christopher, Count of Rietberg (1625–1640) (b. 1606)
- date unknown
  - Bombogor, Evenk chief
  - Adriana Basile, Italian composer (b. 1580)
