= Chauvin (surname) =

Chauvin is a surname of French origin. Notable people with the surname include:

- Derek Chauvin (born 1976), an American former police officer who was convicted of murdering George Floyd
- Étienne Chauvin (1640–1725), French Protestant divine
- Frank Chauvin (c. 1933–2015), a Canadian charity worker
- Ingrid Chauvin (born 1973), French actress
- Jean Chauvin (1509–1564), French theologian, pastor and reformer
- Jean-Gabriel Chauvin (1889–1976), French sculptor
- Jeanne Chauvin (1862–1926), French lawyer
- Julien Chauvin (born 1979), French violinist
- Landry Chauvin (born 1968), a French former footballer
- Léon Adolphe Chauvin (1861–1904), Canadian lawyer
- Lilyan Chauvin (1925–2008), French-American actress
- Louis Chauvin (1881–1908), American ragtime composer
- Madame Vignon-Chauvin (19th century), French fashion designer
- Marcel Chauvin (1914–2004), French clergyman and auxiliary bishop
- Nicolas Chauvin, a mythical patriot said to have served during Napoleon Bonaparte's reign; origin of the term chauvinism
- Nicolas Chauvin (rugby) (2000–2018), French rugby player
- Nicolas Chauvin de La Frénière (died 1769), son of Nicolas Chauvin (Not the mythical one)
- Pierre de Chauvin de Tonnetuit (c. 1550–1603), French naval and military captain and a lieutenant of New France
- Pierre-Athanase Chauvin (1774–1832), French painter active in Italy
- Remy Chauvin (1913–2009), French biologist
- Victor Chauvin (1844–1913), Arabic and Hebrew professor
- Yves Chauvin (1930–2015), French chemist
