= Chauvin =

Chauvin may refer to:

== Places ==
- Chauvin, Alberta, Canada, a village
- Chauvin, Louisiana, U.S., a town in the Bayou Chauvin
- Chauvin, Michigan, U.S.

== Others ==
- Chauvin (surname)

== See also ==
- Chauvinism
