= Peter Kirstein =

Peter Kirstein may refer to:

- Peter T. Kirstein (1933–2020), British computer scientist who played a significant role in the creation of the Internet
- Petrus Kirstenius (1577–1640), German physician and orientalist
