= Rickardsson =

Rickardsson is a Swedish surname. Notable people with the surname include:

- Daniel Rickardsson (born 1982), Swedish cross-country skier
- Tony Rickardsson (born 1970), Swedish motorcycle speedway rider
