= Uplands nation =

Student society at Uppsala University, Sweden

Coordinates: 59°51′35″N 17°37′46″E

- Uppsala University
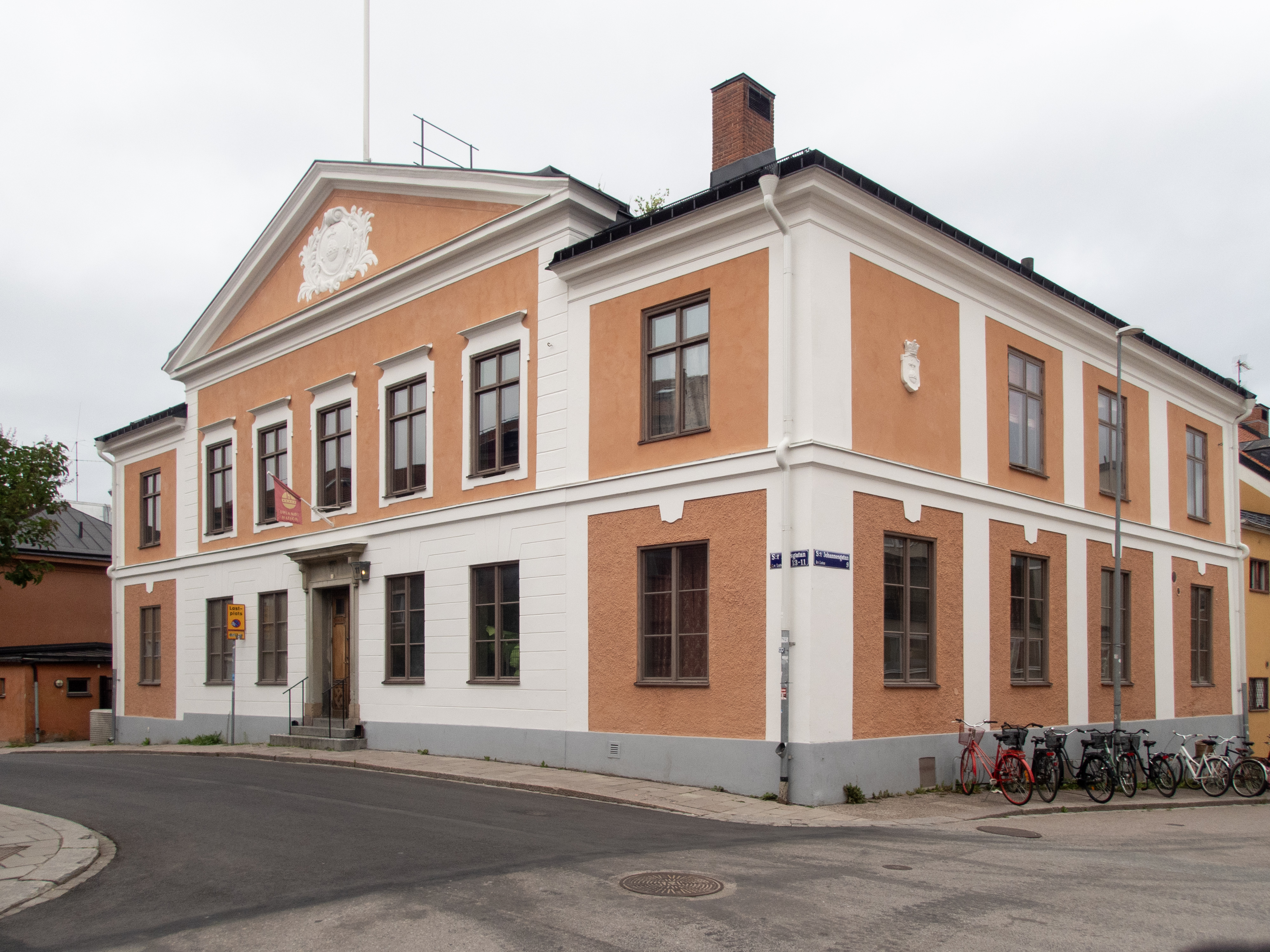
- Location: S:t Larsgatan 11; 732 11 Uppsala; Sweden
- Latin name: Natio Uplandica
- Established: 1642
- Inspektor: Sandra Friberg
- Membership: approx. 2600 (2019)
- Website: www.uplandsnation.se

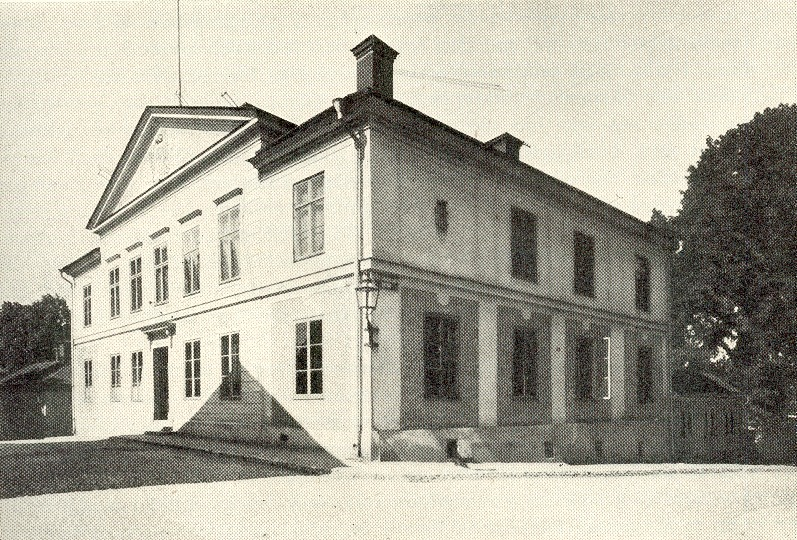
Uplands nation, exterior of the building. Photo from before 1915.

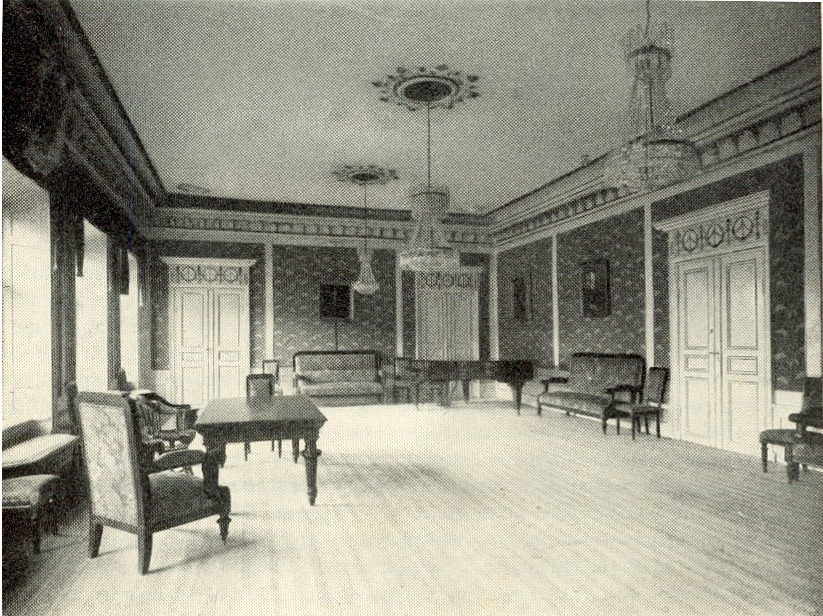
Uplands nation, the banquet and meeting hall (nationssalen). Photo from before 1915.

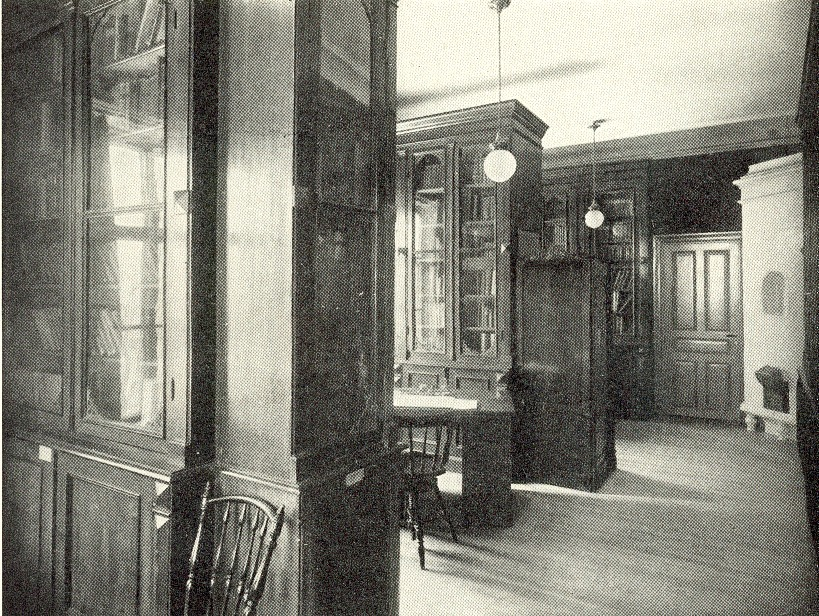
Uplands nation, the library. Photo from before 1915.

Uplands nation (the Uppland Nation) is a student society and one of thirteen nations at Uppsala University. It has traditionally recruited its members from the province of Uppland, which surrounds and includes Uppsala and stretches down south to the northern part of Stockholm. The nation uses an older spelling of the toponym, Uplands, but Upplands nation has also been used.

The nation offers entertainment and social activities to members, including formal dinners, balls, the women's choir UDK Discordia, the orchestra Wijkwanska Blecket, a theatre group, a sports association, and a culture committee. The nation has a pub, a café, regular jazz bars, and a library. As of February 2026, the nation has about 2,400 members.

== History and building ==
In its earliest form, Uplands nation was founded in 1642. The current nation is the result of a merger of Uplands Nation in 1823 with Fjärdhundra nation and on the 23rd of October 1829 with Roslags nation, two smaller nations which recruited students from specific areas within the province of Uppland (Fjärdhundraland and Roslagen), each of which also date to the early 1640s (the earliest documents from Fjärdhundra nation are also from 1642, while the archives from Roslags nation begin already in 1640). Ending in the 1840s, the nation was called Uplands-Roslags nation, whence-after it has been known as Uplands Nation, although the opinion of whether to spell it with one or two "P"s has changed over time.

Uplands nation (fl. 1642) | Fjärdhundra nation (fl. 1642)
Uplands nation (merger 1823)
Uplands nation (merger 1829)

Roslags nation (fl. 1640)

Before acquiring the current nation building in 1825, the nation held its meetings either in the house of its inspector – the professor who had been appointed by the university to guard over the virtue and behaviour of the students of a particular nation – or in the home of one of its members. The steadily increasing size of the library forced the nation to start renting space in 1763, but as late as 1814, the protocol mentions a meeting in the home of the member "J. Almquist", i.e. the later notable writer Carl Jonas Love Almqvist.

The current building of the nation was built by the master turner Peter Strandman after a fire in 1809, but some of the walls date to sometime before 1770. It was acquired by the nation in 1825. The nation had previously owned the neighbouring plot for a few years, but sold this to Västmanlands-Dala nation.

In 1893, twenty years after the university began to accept female students, the nation welcomed its first female member.

The 20th century saw a dramatic increase in the number of students at the university, and the character of student nations changed as a result. Up until this point, it was possible and likely for a student to be acquainted with all other students originating from their province, and thus all members of their nation. However, during the 20th century, a student became one of many, and from then on it took a conscious decision to become active at ones nation and get to know the other members.

The 20th century also saw nations become more concerned with money-making ventures. Dance nights, pubs, cafés, and restaurants began to be organised and continue to this day in order to cover the day-to-day costs of running the nation and maintaining the house.

In the 1950s a new wing was added according to the design of the architect Sten Hummel-Gumælius. The garden of the nation includes sculptures by Carl Milles and Carl Eldh. On the garden wall along the street Sysslomansgatan is a plaque with a medallion (based on the portrait by Johan Tobias Sergel) in the memory of the poet Anna Maria Lenngren, who grew up in a house once standing there. This wing contains twenty student rooms; another thirty are located in a different house two blocks away.

== Organisation ==
The landskap, the nation's highest decision-making body, meets three times per semester. All members have the right to vote at the meetings where people are elected to positions within the nation, the budget is established, and important decisions are approved. Besides the landskap there is an Administrative Board (the nation's board), with eight elected members, the full-time members of the nation, the inspector and pro-inspector, and the treasurer. The Administrative Board, among other things, makes decisions concerning the nations economic and administrative management.

There is also a Property Board which is responsible for the nation's property management. The Property Board makes decisions regarding the property and the nation's housing. The Property Committee is responsible to the landskap and consists of six members, the second curator, and the treasurer.

The nation has five full-time members who lead daily operations:

- The First Curator, responsible for questions of membership and the general point of contact for the nation.
- The Second Curator, responsible for the nation's economy and property.
- The Third Curator, responsible for the serving of alcohol at the nation as well as events such as clubs, formal dinners.
- The Kitchen Master, responsible for food and hygiene.
- The Pub Master, responsible for the pub.

There are also a number of other elected members in positions ranging from librarian to new-student hosts, equality officer, international secretary, and many more.

== Notable people ==
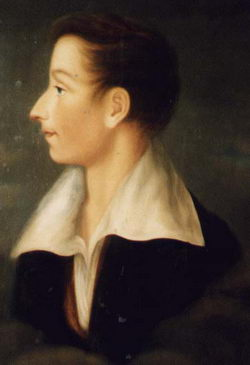
Svante Wijkman

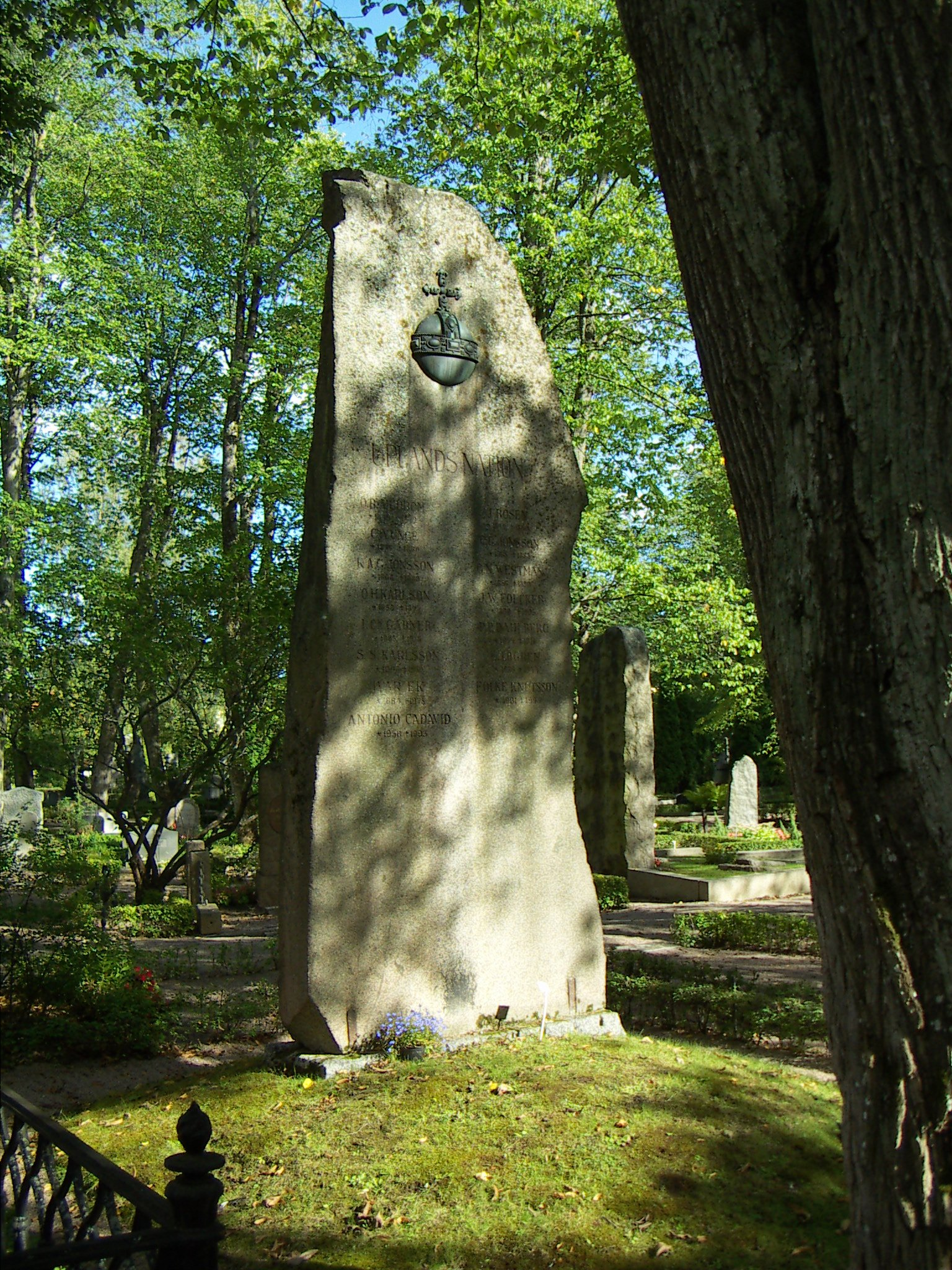
As all the Uppsala nations, Uplands nation has its own grave at the Uppsala Old Cemetery, where members of the nation have occasionally been buried.

Former curators (chairmen) of the nation include the chemist and later Nobel laureate Svante Arrhenius and the later Secretary General of the U.N. and Nobel peace prize laureate Dag Hammarskjöld. Other members have included the songwriter Prince Gustaf, the Duke of Uppland, a central figure in Uppsala student life in the 1840s who died young in 1852, the philosopher Pontus Wikner, and the writer C. J. L. Almqvist. The diplomat Hans Blix, who studied Law in Uppsala, was director for the theatre society of Uplands nation for a year. Nathan Söderblom, Archbishop of the Church of Sweden and recipient of the Nobel Peace Prize, was an inspector of the nation.

An important part of the lore of the nation concerns a young boy who never actually matriculated in the nation: Svante Wijkman, who was a member of a local bourgeois family and who died in 1837, during his last year in the Cathedral School in Uppsala. After his premature death, his mother donated scholarships both to the school and to the nation, which her son presumably would have joined in the near future if he had lived. A posthumous portrait of young Wijkman accompanied the donation.

Ignorance of the – easily verifiable – real identity of the boy in the picture among members has led speculations about his early death being the result of too much partying and he has been claimed to haunt the nation. Besides the Wijkman room (Wijkmanska rummet) where the portrait hangs, other institutions of the nation have been named after him, including a brass band (Wijkmanska blecket), a pub (Svantes källare) and a café (Café Wijkman).

== Inspektors ==
Roslags nation

- Christiernus Ravius 1663–1667
- Samuel Skunk 1667–?
- Claudius Arrhenius ?–1682
- Henrik Schütz 1682–1693
- Petrus Hallenius 1693
- Julius Micrander 1694–1695
- Johannes Olderman 1695–1697
- Jesper Svedberg 1698–1697
- Johan Esberg 1703–1712
- Daniel Djurberg 1712–1736
- Magnus Beronius 1738–1746
- Engelbert Halenius 1746–1754
- Lars Benzelstjerna 1754–1760
- Christoffer Clewberg 1760–1776
- Eric Hesselgren 1776–1779
- Erik Hydrén 1779–1786
- Jacob Fredrik Neikter 1787–1803
- Erik Jonas Almquist 1803–1808
- Johannes Daniel Drissel 1808–1823
- Sven Lundblad 1823–1829

Fjärdhundra nation

- Petrus Fontelius 1663–1667
- Jonas Fornelius 1667–1679
- Carl Lundius 1679–1714
- Johan Steuchius 1715–1724
- Israel Nesselius 1724–1739
- Johan Ihre 1740–1779
- Erik Hydrén 1779–1786
- Erik Kinmark 1786–1794
- Andreas Lundström 1794–1805
- Samuel Ödmann 1806–1823

Uplands nation

- Petrus Hoffvenius 1663
- Johannes Jacobi Bureus 1663–1664
- Julius Micrander 1678–1695
- Johannes Olderman 1695–1697
- Erik Ljung 1698–1704
- Johan Upmarck Rosenadler 1704–1716
- Olof Celsius 1717–1756
- Johannes Amnell 1756–1789
- Johannes Lostbom 1789–1797
- Johan Winbom 1797–1826
- Sven Lundblad 1826–1830
- Israel Hwasser 1830–1839
- Karl Jonas Almquist 1840–1844
- Otto Fredrik Tullberg 1844–1850
- Lars Anton Anjou 1850–1855
- Elof Wallquist 1855–1857
- Carl Benedict Mesterton 1857–1887
- Tycho Tullberg 1887–1907
- Nathan Söderblom 1907–1910
- Carl Thore Mörner 1910–1920
- Germund Wirgin 1920–1933
- Axel Brusewitz 1933–1945
- Erik Lönnroth 1946–1953
- Folke Knutsson 1953–1967
- Clarence Nilsson 1967–1979
- Gösta Arturson 1979–?
- Karin Dahlgren-Caldwell 1999–2009
- Jacob Höglund 2009–2019
- Björn Victor 2019–2024
- Sandra Friberg 2024–

== References and further reading ==
All references are in Swedish

- Eugène Lewenhaupt, Anteckningar om Uplands nation i Upsala före 1830, Upsala, 1877.
- Isidor Carlsson, Uplands nation 1800-1914: En skildring, Uppsala: Upplands nation 1915.
- Isidor Carlsson, "Upplands nations hus", in Albin Roosval (ed.), Nationshusen i Uppsala. Illustrerade skildringar af flera författare, E. Lundquist: Stockholm 1915, p. 19-36.
- Studenten, staden och sanningen: bilder och essayer: utgivna med anledning av Uplands nations 350-årsjubileum, Bengt Erik Rydén (ed.), Uppsala: Uplands nation 1992. (Published for the 350th anniversary of the nation)
- Svedberg, Theodor (The), "Arrhenius, Svante", Svenskt biografiskt lexikon, vol. 2, p. 287-301.
