= Wranå =

Wranå is a Swedish surname. Notable people with the surname include:

- Isabella Wranå (born 1997), Swedish curler, daughter of Mats
- Mats Wranå (born 1965), Swedish curling coach, father of Isabella and Rasmus
- Rasmus Wranå (born 1994), Swedish curler, son of Mats
