= Grosse Pointe Township, Michigan =

- Former civil township
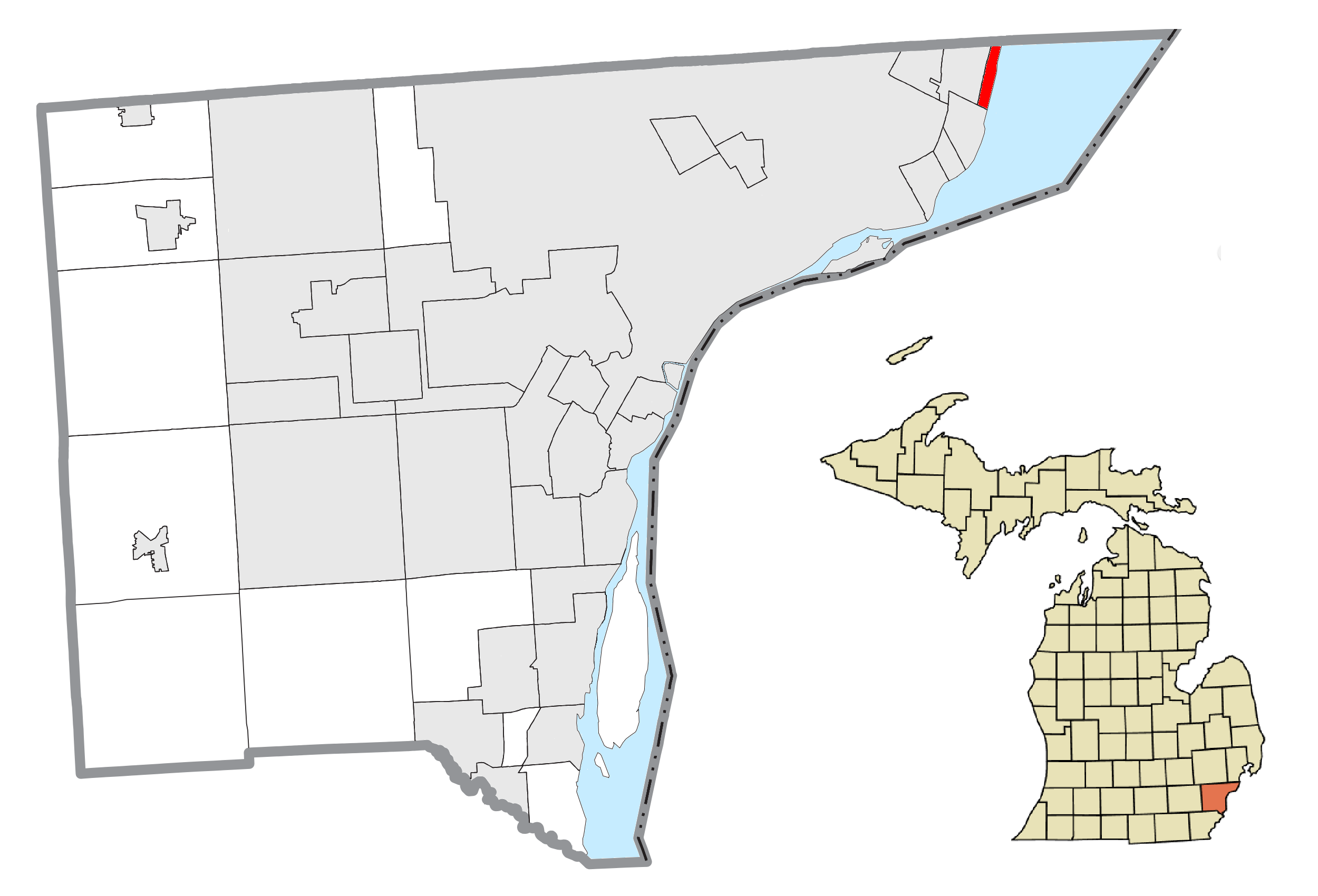
- Last remaining portion within Wayne County at the 2000 census before incorporation as the city of Grosse Pointe Shores in 2009

- Location within the state of Michigan Location within the United States
- Coordinates: 42°26′7″N 82°52′50″W
- Country: United States
- State: Michigan
- County: Wayne
- Established: 1849
- Disestablished: 2009

Area
  - Total: 18.6 sq mi (48.2 km^{2})
  - Land: 1.0 sq mi (2.6 km^{2})
  - Water: 17.6 sq mi (45.6 km^{2})
- Elevation: 574 ft (175 m)

Population (2000)
  - Total: 2,743
  - Density: 2,781/sq mi (1,073.9/km^{2})
- Time zone: UTC-5 (Eastern (EST))
  - Summer (DST): UTC-4 (EDT)
- ZIP codes: 48230, 48236
- Area code: 313
- FIPS code: 26-35500
- GNIS feature ID: 1626409

Grosse Pointe Township was a civil township of Wayne County in the U.S. state of Michigan. Originally including all of the Grosse Pointe communities, and the northeastern portion of the City of Detroit, in its later years, it was reduced to the portion of the village of Grosse Pointe Shores that was in Wayne County.

The township was created in 1848 with the division of Hamtramck Township. On February 24, 2009, the residents of Grosse Pointe Shores voted to incorporate as a city, ending the existence of the township.

== Communities ==
- Fairview was an incorporated village within the southwest corner of township on the Detroit River. Originally conceived in 1896 by the Fairview Land Company on 900 acres of marshland, and formally incorporated as a village in 1903, its boundaries were Bewick to the west, Mack to the north, Cadieux to the east, and the Detroit River to the south. The village was short-lived; the city of Detroit incorporated the part of village from its western border to Alter Road in 1907, and the remainder was incorporated as the village of Grosse Pointe Park in the same year.
- Chauvin was a village with a population of at least 500, existing from at least 1897 to 1908, until being annexed by Detroit, which it was a mile east from.

== Geography ==
According to the United States Census Bureau, the township had a total area of 18.6 square miles (48 km^{2}), of which, 1.0 square mile (2.6 km^{2}) of it is land and 17.6 square miles (46 km^{2}) of it (94.73%) is water.

== Demographics ==
As of the census of 2000, there were 2,743 people, 1,018 households, and 834 families residing in the township. The population density was 2,781.3 inhabitants per square mile (1,073.9/km^{2}). There were 1,054 housing units at an average density of 1,068.7 per square mile (412.6/km^{2}). The racial makeup of the township was 93.95% White, 0.58% African American, 0.18% Native American, 3.97% Asian, 0.44% from other races, and 0.87% from two or more races. Hispanic or Latino of any race were 1.79% of the population.

There were 1,018 households, out of which 28.8% had children under the age of 18 living with them, 75.6% were married couples living together, 4.5% had a female householder with no husband present, and 18.0% were non-families. 16.5% of all households were made up of individuals, and 12.2% had someone living alone who was 65 years of age or older. The average household size was 2.69 and the average family size was 3.02.

In the township the population was spread out, with 23.2% under the age of 18, 5.0% from 18 to 24, 16.8% from 25 to 44, 30.9% from 45 to 64, and 24.1% who were 65 years of age or older. The median age was 48 years. For every 100 females, there were 99.8 males. For every 100 females age 18 and over, there were 94.0 males.

The median income for a household in the township was $114,863, and the median income for a family was $141,319. Males had a median income of $100,000 versus $58,750 for females. The per capita income for the township was $69,731. About 2.7% of families and 3.0% of the population were below the poverty line, including 4.6% of those under age 18 and 3.2% of those age 65 or over.
