= Jean-Gabriel Chauvin =

French sculptor

Jean Chauvin
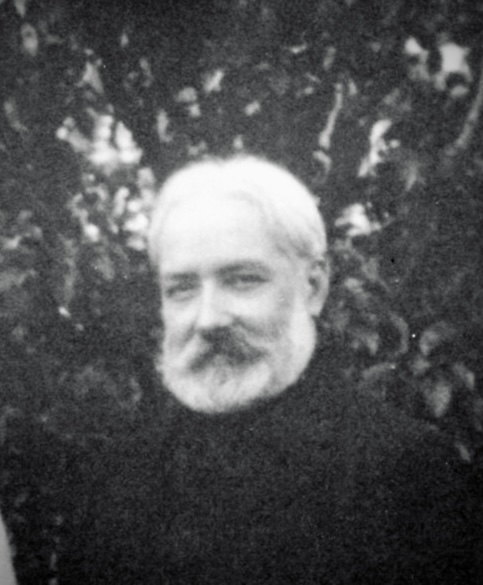
- Born: Jean Gabriel Chauvin; March 30, 1889; Rochefort
- Died: May 15, 1976 (aged 87); Saint-Martin-lès-Melle
- Citizenship: France
- Occupation: Sculptor

Jean Gabriel Chauvin, born in Rochefort on March 30, 1889, and died in Saint-Martin-lès-Melle on May 15, 1976, was a French sculptor.

He was one of the first to develop abstract sculpture (La Toilette, 1909). and is therefore considered a pioneer in the field.

== Biography ==
Jean Chauvin was the only survivor, along with his twin brother André Joseph, of a family of six children. The themes of birth and twinhood permeate his entire body of work.

His first known sculpture dates from 1906: a piece of birch wood carved with a knife at the age of 17, which he later said he had hidden under a pile of coal to keep it from the eyes of a father who was harshly opposed to his artistic calling.

In 1908, at the age of 19, he arrived in Paris and was admitted to the École des Arts Décoratifs on March 14. He later joined the École des Beaux-Arts, studying in the studio of sculptor Antonin Mercié from January 7, 1909. He remained there until 1915, having been exempted from military service on December 9, 1914. During this period, he met François Pompon, with whom he would develop a close relationship,

Between 1913 and 1920, Chauvin took part in both the Salon d'Automne and the Salon des Indépendants while working in the studio of Joseph Bernard. where he contributed to the carving of The Dance (now housed at the Musée d'Orsay). As a member of the Salon d'Automne, he also exhibited two sculptures there in 1928. As he definitively turned toward abstract sculpture, he caught the attention of collector Jacques Doucet, who purchased one of his works

In 1928, Chauvin held his first solo exhibition at the gallery Au Sacre du Printemps. The gallery was later taken over by Jeanne Bucher under her own name, and Chauvin continued to exhibit there until her death in 1947. During those years, he developed a friendship with art historian and curator Robert Rey, who would become Director of Visual Arts in 1944, and Jean Cassou, founder of the Musée National d'Art Moderne, were among his close acquaintances during this period.

Around the 1930s, he moved to 9 rue du Chalet in Malakoff and became the owner of a house in Port-des-Barques.

In 1935, at the request of architect Pierre Patout, he created a large sculpture entitled Fontaine Lumineuse for the ocean liner Normandie.

In 1937, again at Patout's request, Chauvin created a monumental sculpture (11 meters high) in exposed concrete for the Pavillon des Artistes Décorateurs at the Exposition Internationale, as well as two large porcelain basins for the Sèvres Pavilion.

In 1939, he exhibited at the Salon des Réalités Nouvelles at the Charpentier Gallery, where he presented the sculpture Guerre (War).

From 1947 to 1955, under the guidance of Cécile Goldscheider (curator of the Musée Rodin), Chauvin exhibited in Bern (Switzerland), Prague (Czechoslovakia), Amsterdam (Netherlands), Stockholm (Sweden), Düsseldorf (Germany), and elsewhere. In 1949, he held a solo exhibition at the Maeght Gallery in Paris.

Throughout these years, Chauvin divided his time between Malakoff, where he modeled and drew for six months of the year, and Port-des-Barques, where he sculpted for the remaining six months.

Several exhibitions followed up until the end of his life.

Among the significant moments of his later career were: a monograph devoted to him by Christian Zervos in 1960; his selection to represent France at the 31st Venice Biennale in 1962; and in 1976, his donation of 162 sculptural models to the Musée National d'Art Moderne.

Entirely devoted to his art, Chauvin's personal life remains largely unknown.

== Public collections ==
=== France ===
- Centre Pompidou
- Musée d'Art Moderne de la Ville de Paris
- Centre national des arts plastiques
- Musée des Beaux-Arts de Dijon
- Musée Cantini

=== United States ===
- Smithsonian Institution, Washington D.C.
- Metropolitan Museum of Art

=== Belgium ===
- Musée d'Art moderne et d'Art contemporain, Liège

=== Israël ===
- Tel Aviv Museum of Art

=== United-Kingdom ===
- Victoria and Albert Museum
