= Nicolas Letourneux =

French preacher and ascetical writer

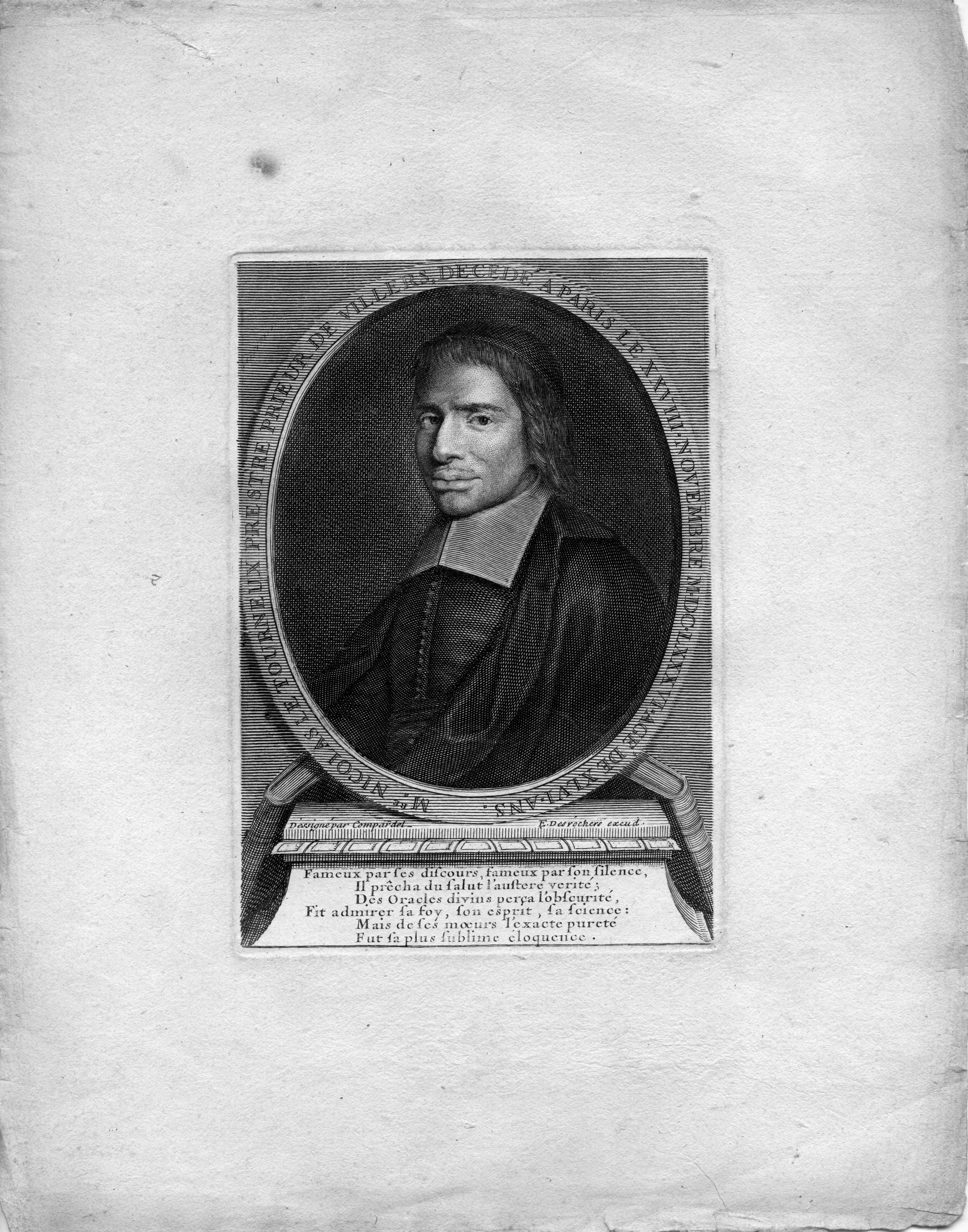
Nicolas Letourneux Portrait

Nicolas Letourneux (30 April 1640 – 28 November 1686) was a French preacher and ascetical writer of Jansenistic tendencies.

Letourneux was born at Rouen. His parents were poor, but the talents he displayed at an early age attracted the attention of some wealthy benefactors, whose assistance enabled him to study the humanities at the Jesuit College in Paris, and later philosophy at the Collège des Grassins. To Jean Hersant, his teacher at the latter institution, may be traced his Jansenistic views. Ordained priest at Rouen in 1662, he served for some years as curate there. About 1670 he removed to Paris, became closely associated with the Port-Royalists, and began to cultivate Jansenistic asceticism. He exchanged his soutane for a coarse grey robe and abstained from celebrating Mass, to expiate in this manner what he esteemed his guilt in having accepted ordination at so early an age (22).

His intercourse with Lemaître restored him to more orthodox Catholic views; returning to pastoral duties, he acted as chaplain at the Collège des Grassins. His sermons at various Paris churches quickly placed him in the front rank of the preachers of his day, and in 1675 his work on the text Martha, Martha, thou art careful (Luke, x, 41) won the Balzac prize for eloquence awarded by the French Academy. In such esteem was he held by his spiritual superiors that François de Harlay de Champvallon appointed him, in 1679, temporary confessor of the nuns of Port-Royal, and also a member of the archiepiscopal commission for the emendation of the Breviary. His relations with the leading Jansenists, however, soon awakened distrust, and he found it necessary to retire, in 1682, to the Priory of Villiers-sur-Fère, a benefice granted him by his patron, Jacques-Nicolas Colbert. In this retirement he devoted the remainder of his life to his ascetical compositions. He died in Paris.

== Principal writings ==
- Histoire de la vie de Jesus-Christ (about 1673)
- Le catéchisme de la pénitence (1676)
- L'Année chrétienne, ou les Messes des Dimanches, Féries et Fêtes de toute l'année, en latin et en français, avec l'explication des Epîtres et des Evangiles et un abrégé de la Vie des Saints, dont on fait l'Office. Of this work Letourneux wrote nine volumes, and two were added by the Belgian Jansenist, Ruth d'Ans. Six volumes were published before 1686, when they were condemned for their Jansenistic views. The work was placed on the Index Librorum Prohibitorum on 7 Sept., 1695.
- Principes et règles de la vie chrétienne (Paris, 1688)
- Explication littéraire et morale de l'épître de S. Paul aux Romains (Paris, 1695)
- Bréviaire Romain en latin et français (4 vols., Paris, 1687), condemned by the archiepiscopal authorities as heretical and for containing innovation contrary to the spirit and practice of the Catholic Church. The episcopal ban was subsequently removed, and the work was never placed on the Roman Index.
