= Nicolas Chauvin (rugby union) =

French rugby union player

Nicolas Chauvin (2000 - December 12, 2018) was a French rugby union player who played as a flanker for the Stade Français youth team. He died following injuries sustained during a match in December 2018, an incident that sparked widespread concern and reflection on player safety within the sport.

== Biography ==
=== Early life ===
Nicolas Chauvin was born in 2000 and joined the youth ranks of Stade Français.

=== Fatal injury and death ===
On December 9, 2018, during an under-23 match between Stade Français and Union Bordeaux-Bègles, Chauvin was subjected to a double tackle that resulted in a severe spinal cord injury, specifically, the dislocation of two cervical vertebrae. He suffered a cardiac arrest on the field and was immediately transported to the Bordeaux University Hospital. Despite emergency medical care and intensive treatment, Chauvin died three days later, on December 12, 2018.

== Reactions ==
Chauvin’s death deeply affected the French rugby community. Tributes poured in from fellow players, clubs, the French Rugby Federation (FFR), and supporters across the country. His death reignited debate about safety protocols and tackle regulations in youth and professional rugby.

The death of Nicolas Chauvin came amid a series of rugby-related tragedies in France. His was the third fatality in just a few months: in May 2018, 17-year-old Adrien Descrulhes died of a brain hemorrhage after a concussion in an under-18 match; in August, 21-year-old Louis Fajfrowski collapsed and died in the changing room after a tackle during a pre-season game. Medical reports later linked his death to commotio cordis, a rare cardiac arrest triggered by a blow to the chest.

== Legal proceedings and follow-up ==
Following the incident in December 2018, a judicial investigation was opened to examine the circumstances of Nicolas Chauvin’s death. However, in mid-2019, the case was closed without further action, meaning that no individual or institution was held criminally responsible.

On September 25, 2019, Nicolas's father, Philippe Chauvin, announced in an interview with L'Équipe that he would file a criminal complaint for manslaughter. He expressed his belief that the tackle which led to his son’s death was not within the rules of the game and that if the rules had been properly followed, Nicolas would still be alive. A former rugby player himself, Philippe Chauvin described the legal action as a necessary step, not only to seek justice for his son but also to raise awareness about the risks associated with rugby, particularly regarding high-impact tackles. He criticized the lack of sanctions following the incident, arguing that failure to discipline unsafe behavior effectively legitimizes it. His objective, he stated, was to ensure that similar tragedies do not happen to other young players.

In January 2025, the Bordeaux judicial court ruled a dismissal for the two players involved in the tackle, citing the absence of criminal liability, although a sporting fault was acknowledged. Nicolas Chauvin’s family disagreed with the ruling and announced plans to appeal the decision.

On March 22, 2025, the French newspaper Le Parisien published a detailed investigation into the incident, including the video of the fatal tackle, with the family’s approval. The article accused the rugby world of maintaining an omertà around the circumstances of Nicolas’s death and highlighted the lack of institutional accountability over the preceding six years. The investigation triggered renewed public interest and political response. The Ministry of Sports, which had previously failed to act on the family’s repeated requests, responded the day after the article’s publication, announcing that a long-awaited technical report on the incident had finally been completed. A meeting was scheduled for April 17, 2025, to present the findings. The French Rugby Federation (FFR), represented by its president Florian Grill and national technical director Olivier Lièvremont, was set to attend alongside ministry officials.
