= Chauvin, Michigan =

Coordinates: 42°26′7″N 82°52′50″W

Chauvin was a village in Grosse Pointe Township, Michigan in what is now the Hilger Avenue district of Detroit. It had a post office from 1897 until 1908. In 1908 it was annexed by Detroit.
