= Swedish name =

In Sweden, a person must have a surname and one or more given names. Two given names are common. Surnames are inherited from the parents in the order of "same as elder sibling, if any, specified by parents, or mother's last name," and given names must be chosen by the parents at birth. The calling name (Swedish: tilltalsnamn), by which the person is normally identified in conversation, is one of the given names but not necessarily the first. In contexts in which the full name is spelled out, the calling name is often indicated by an asterisk, capital letters, underlining or italics. For example, Märta Birgit* Nilsson is known as Birgit Nilsson, and Björn* Kristian Ulvaeus is known as Björn Ulvaeus.

Common calling names in Sweden by year of birth

== Transition from patronymic to surname ==
In Scandinavia, surnames proper did not exist until the Late Middle Ages; instead, patronymics were used. In Sweden, the patronymic endings are –sson by default or, now very rarely, for females, –sdotter, e.g. Karlsson or Karlsdotter ("Karl's son", "Karl's daughter"). The latter ending, if not from ancient times, are mostly recent creations, such as Amelia Andersdotter and Karin Olofsdotter. They were gradually replaced by permanent surnames starting with the nobility and clergy, followed by the middle classes. The vast majority of people adopted surnames only in the late 19th century, often by taking patronymic surnames.

=== Latin and Greek names ===
The adoption of Latin names was first used by the Catholic clergy in the 15th century as scholarly publications were written in Latin. The given name was preceded by Herr (Sir), like Herr Lars, Herr Olof, Herr Hans, followed by a latinised form of patronymic names: Lars Petersson, latinised as Laurentius Petri. They were not hereditary per se, as priests were not allowed to marry. From the time of the Reformation, the latinised form of their birthplace (Laurentius Petri Gothus, from Östergötland) became a common naming practice for the clergy. These names became hereditary.

Another subsequent practice was the use of Greek with the ending with ander, the Greek word for man (e.g. Micrander, Mennander).

=== Names of nobility ===
The Swedish nobility during medieval times did not have formal naming conventions, as letters of patent did not appear until 1420. The families of the uradel used names deriving from the crest of the house such as Brahe, Natt och Dag, Bielke, Sparre, Oxenstierna, Trolle, Bååt and Bonde. After the nobility had been established as the first estate of the realm in 1626, family names became mandatory (disambiguation was sometimes needed), and the use of patronymics by the nobility fell out of use.

In the 17th and the 18th centuries, the surname was only rarely the original family name of the ennobled; usually, a more imposing new name was chosen. This was a period which produced a myriad of two-word Swedish family names for the nobility; very favoured prefixes were Adler– (German for 'eagle'), Ehren– (German for 'honor', Swedish ära), Silfver– ('silver') and Gyllen– or Gylden- ('golden' or 'gilded'). Unlike a British peerage title ("Lord Somewhere"), such a name became the new surname of the whole house, and the old surname was dropped altogether. The ennoblement (in 1632) of Peder Joenson is a case in point in which the use of the old surname was discontinued, and Peder Gyllensvärd afterward came into use. An illustration of the old name being modified by having an addition to it can be seen the ennoblement of the brothers Johan Henrik Lang and Lars Adam Lang (in 1772) taking the surname Langenskjöld.

Names prefixed with von or af (older spelling of "av", Sw: "from") which were commonly adopted in the 18th and the 19th centuries respectively denote nobility, often in combination with a change to the original name. Examples include Carl Linnæus (also Carolus Linnæus) ennobled Carl von Linné, or af Donner from the German name Donner. When a nobleman was raised to higher rank to friherre or greve, the new branch became its own house with a new name, often by appending af and a place name: Wachtmeister af Björkö, Wachtmeister af Johannishus, Wachtmeister af Mälsåker.

=== Ornamental names ===
In the 17th and even more so in the 18th centuries, the Swedish middle classes in the 17th century, particularly artisans and town dwellers, adopted family names in imitation of the gentry. Ornamental family names joining two elements from birthplace or nature, such as Bergman ("mountain man"), Holmberg ("island mountain"), Lindgren ("linden branch"), Sandström ("sand stream") and Åkerlund ("field grove") were quite frequent and remain common today.

Another form of ornamentation is the use of archaic or ornamental spelling. Sometimes, the name preserves an older spelling or variant, sometimes it is used purely for decorative purposes. Examples include skiöldh, skiöld, skjöld for modern "sköld"; quist or qvist for modern "kvist"; siöö or siö for modern "sjö"; silfver for modern "silver"; etc. These words can be used as part of a longer name (Lagerquist etc) or as a family name in their own right.

=== Hereditary son names ===
During the 19th century, the patronymics became permanent "son names". Before Sweden's Family Name Regulation Act (släktnamnsförordningen) of 1901, the patronymic was more widely used than the surname.

=== Soldier names ===
Another source of surnames was the Swedish allotment system, which from the mid-to-late 17th century was organised to maintain a standing army, and a number of farms were grouped together and supported a soldier with a small cottage and piece of land. The soldiers were often given names either describing their character (e.g. Modig 'brave', Skarp 'sharp' or Snygg 'clean') or weapons (e.g. Sabel 'sabre', Lans 'lance' or Sköld 'shield') or joining two elements from nature as above. The name often followed the cottage rather than the soldier. The soldiers' names became actual surnames during the 19th century.

== Farm names ==
To disambiguate between several people with the same name in a community or parish, additional descriptions, usually the name of a farm, such as (Anders Larsson vid Dammen, Swedish Anders Larsson by the dam) could be used colloquially but were not always recorded in church records.

In the region of Dalecarlia, the farm names (Swedish: gårdsnamn) are often unique and put first in the name in genitive form: Ollas Anders Eriksson (Anders from Olla, son of Erik). As patronyms were replaced by surnames, they either became surnames proper (at the end) or continued to be used in the traditional way in combination with a new surname. The tradition is now recognised in law, and farm names appear before given names in official records.

== Outlawed/banned names ==
When parents name their child, the name must be registered with the Swedish Tax Agency (Swedish Skatteverket). Some names may be denied if they go against Swedish naming law. Names having been denied include:

- Metallica
- Superman
- Ikea
- Allah
- "brfxxccxxmnpcccclllmmnprxvclmnckssqlbb11116" (pronounced "Albin")

== See also ==
- Name days in Sweden
  - Swedish name day list of 2001
- Patronymic
- List of Swedish noble families
