= Jérôme de Gonnelieu =

French Jesuit theologian, ascetical writer and preacher

Jérôme de Gonnelieu (born at Soissons, 8 September 1640; died at Paris, 28 February 1715) was a French Jesuit theologian, ascetical writer, and preacher.

== Life ==
At the age of seventeen he entered the Society of Jesus (4 Oct, 1657). Till the year 1674, when he pronounced his final vows, his services were in various capacities, particularly teaching. From this date his abilities directed towards preaching and evangelism.

== Works ==
In the later part of his life he gave himself up almost exclusively to literary activity. The following is a list of his works:

- "Exercise de la vie spirituelle" (Paris, 1701);
- "De la Présence de Dieu qui renferme tous les principes de la vie intérieure" (Paris, 1703, 1709, 1731; Marseilles, 1827);
- "Méthode de bien prier" (Paris, 1710, 1769);
- "Pratique de la vie intérieure", etc. (Paris, 1710);
- "Instruction sur la Confession et la Communion" (Paris, 1710; printed with preceding work in Paris edition of 1713):
- "Sermon de Norte Seigneur à ses apôtres aprés la Céne, avec des réflections" (Paris, 1712);
- "Nouvelle retaite de huit jours à l'usage des personnes de monde et du cloître" (Paris, 1736).

To the above, almost all the biographies add another work, a French translation of the influential devotional text The Imitation of Christ by Thomas à Kempis. The first edition of this translation bears the title "L'Imitation de Jesus-Christ, Traduction nouvelle: Avec une Pratique et une Piére à la fin de chaque Chapitre (Par. le R. P. de Gonnelieu, de la Compagnie de Jésus, Paris and Nancy, 1712)"; but a great majority of the bibliographies, somewhat arbitrarily, deny that Traduction (translation), as distinct from the secours (helps) at the end of each chapter, is by de Gonnelieu. The opinion of the negative critics seems to be based mainly on the statement of Calmet (op. cit. below) that "the translation is by John-Baptiste Cusson [printer at Nancy], and the rest by P. Gonnelieu". The "Journal des Sçavans", on the other hand, in a review written within one year after the publication of the work, whilst praising the zeal and piety of the translator, says expressly that the version is by P. Gonnelieu; and adds that "Sieur Cusson (one time printer of the Journal) has enriched this first edition by many copper-plates".
