= Johannes Bohn =

German physician (1640–1718)

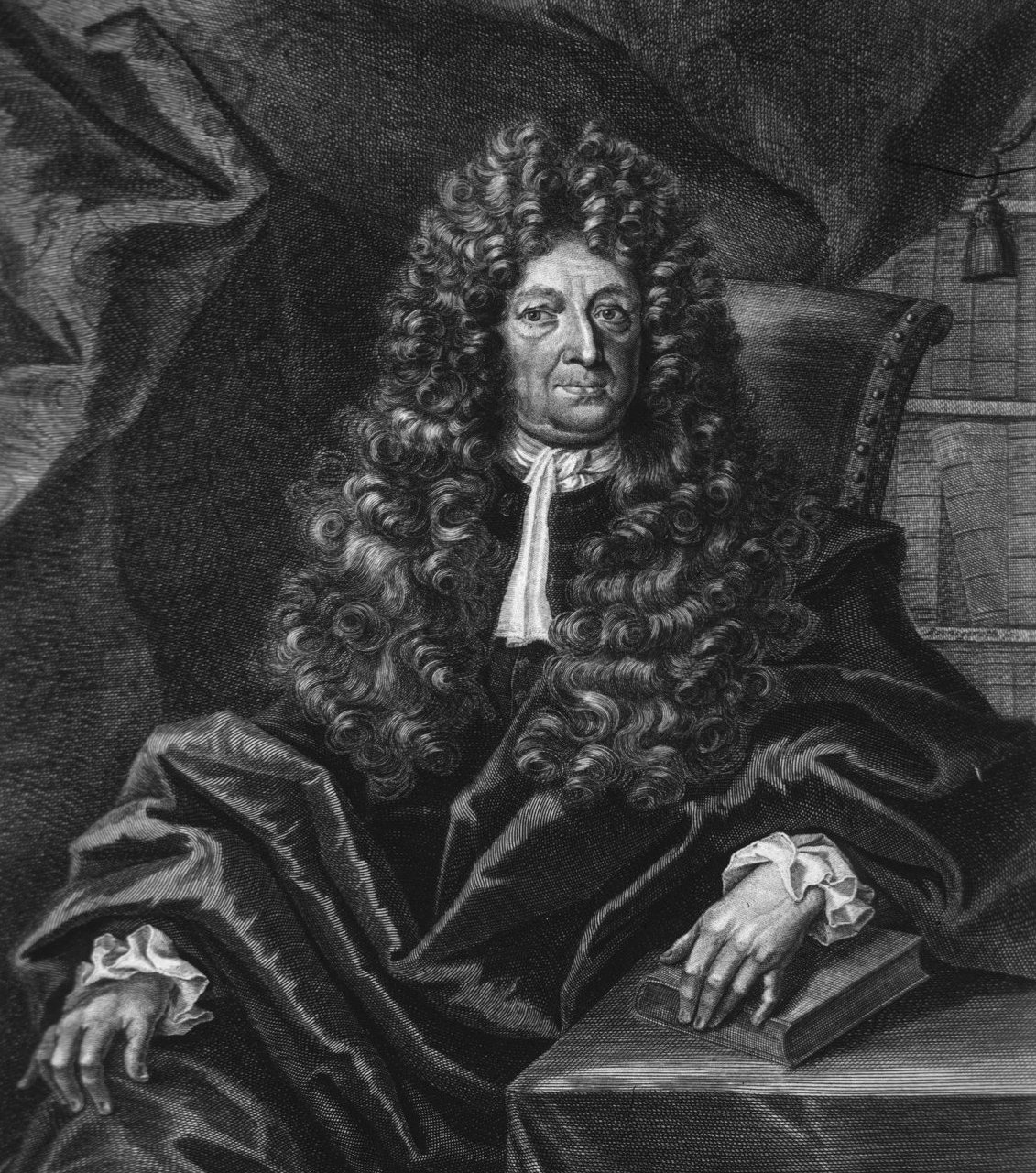
Johannes Bohn

Johannes Bohn (20 July 1640 – 19 December 1718) was a German physician who was a native of Leipzig.

He studied medicine at the University of Leipzig and the University of Jena, and received his doctorate in 1665. In 1668 he was promoted to the anatomical chair at Leipzig, and in 1690 succeeded Gottfried Welsch (1618–1690) as Stadtphysikus for the city of Leipzig. In 1691 he was appointed city physician, and in 1691 professor of therapeutics. He later held the office of rector at the University of Leipzig (1693–94).

Bohn was known for his pioneer work as a medical-legal officer in forensic medicine. He introduced the policy of thorough autopsies of the deceased, and specialized in the investigation of lethal wounds. He also did early research concerning the physiology of the circulatory system.

Many of Bohn's scientific writings were burned prior to his death, as stipulated in his will. Two of his important medical works that survived are:

- * De renunciatione vulnerum seu vulnerum lethalium examen (1689): a medical-legal treatise in which he analyzes the distinction between purposeful and accidental fatal wounds.
- * Circulus anatomico physiologicus seu Oeconomia corporis animalis (1710): a series of lectures on respiration, circulation, the digestive process, fetal development, et al.

== Principal works ==
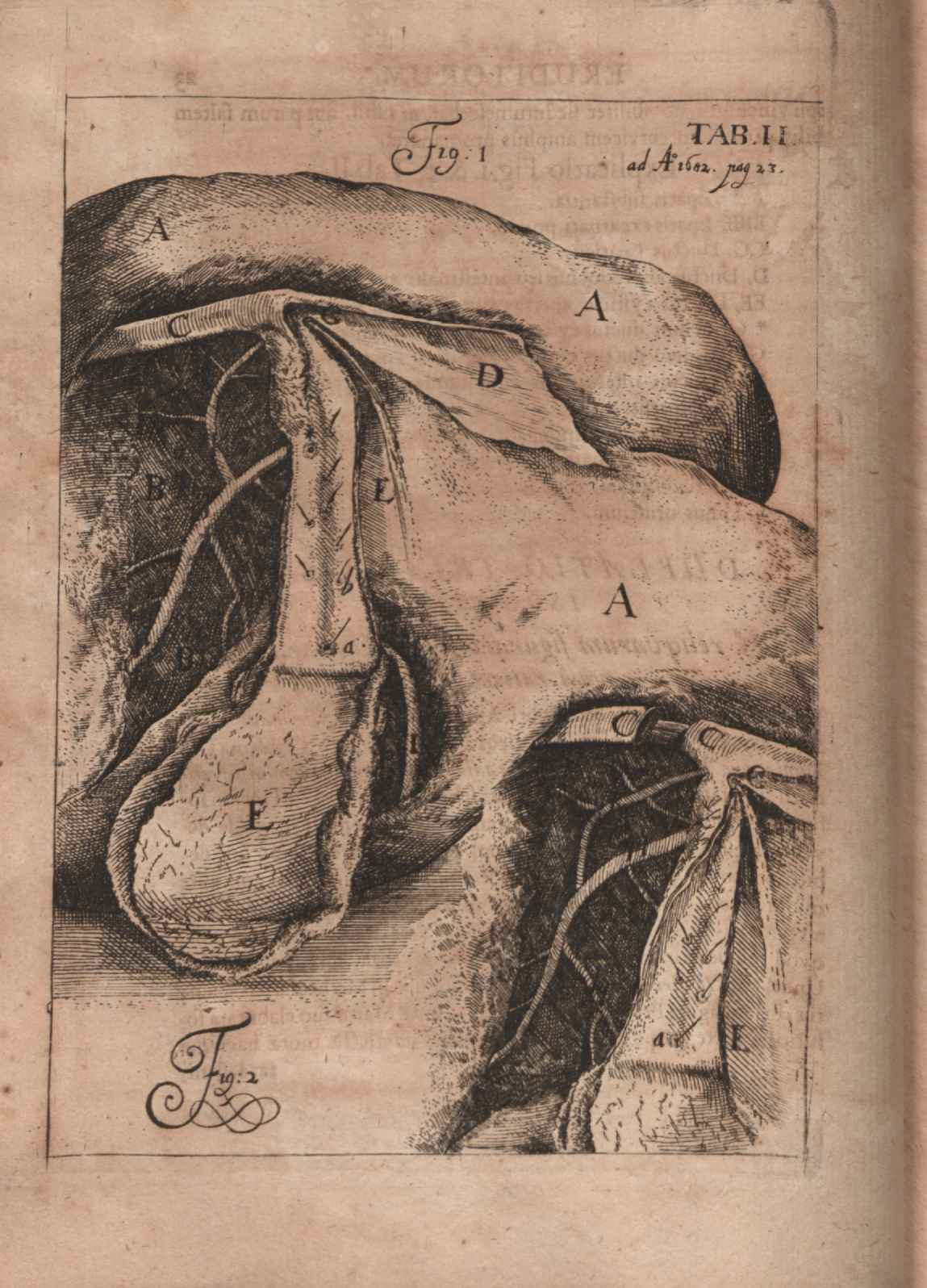
Illustration of * Observationes quaedam anatomicae, structuram vasorum biliariorum, & motum bilis spectantes published in Acta Eruditorum, 1682

- De Alkali et Acidi insufficienta pro principiorum corporum naturalium munere gerendo (Leipzig, 1675).
- Dissertationes chemico-physicae (Leipzig, 1685).
- Meditationes physico-chemicae de aeris in sublunaria influxu (Leipzig, 1678).
- De duumviratu hypochondrium (Leipzig, 1689).
- Observatio atque experimenta circa usum spiritus vini externum in haemorragiis sistendis (Leipzig, 1683).
- Exercitationes physiologicae (Leipzig, 1680).
- De officio medici duplici, clinim nimirum ac forensis (Leipzig, 1689).
- De renunciatione vulnerum lethalium examen (Leipzig, 1689).
