= Étienne Chauvin =

French protestant divine

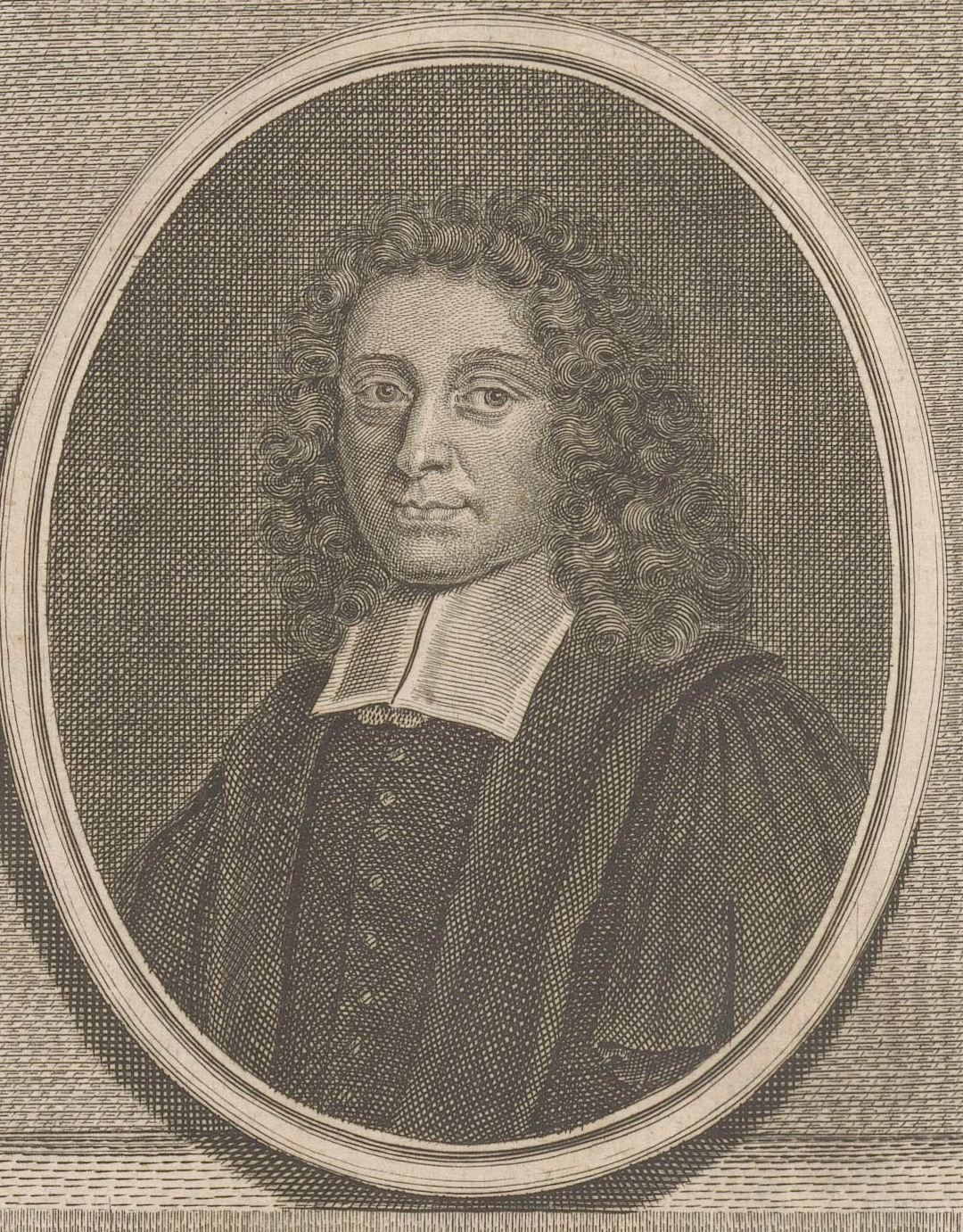
Engraved portrait of Étienne Chauvin

Étienne Chauvin (18 April 1640 – 6 April 1725), French Protestant divine, was born in Nîmes. At the revocation of the Edict of Nantes he retired to Rotterdam where he was for some years preacher at the Walloon church. In 1695 the elector of Brandenburg appointed him pastor and professor of philosophy, and later inspector of the French college at Berlin, where he enjoyed considerable reputation as a representative of Cartesianism and as a student of physics.

His principal work is a laborious Lexicon Rationale, sive Thesaurus Philosophicus (Rotterdam, 1692; new and enlarged edition, Leeuwarden, 1713). He also wrote Theses de Cognitione Dei (1662), and started the Nouveau Journal des Savants (1694–1698).
