= Petrus Kirstenius =

German physician and orientalist (1577–1640)

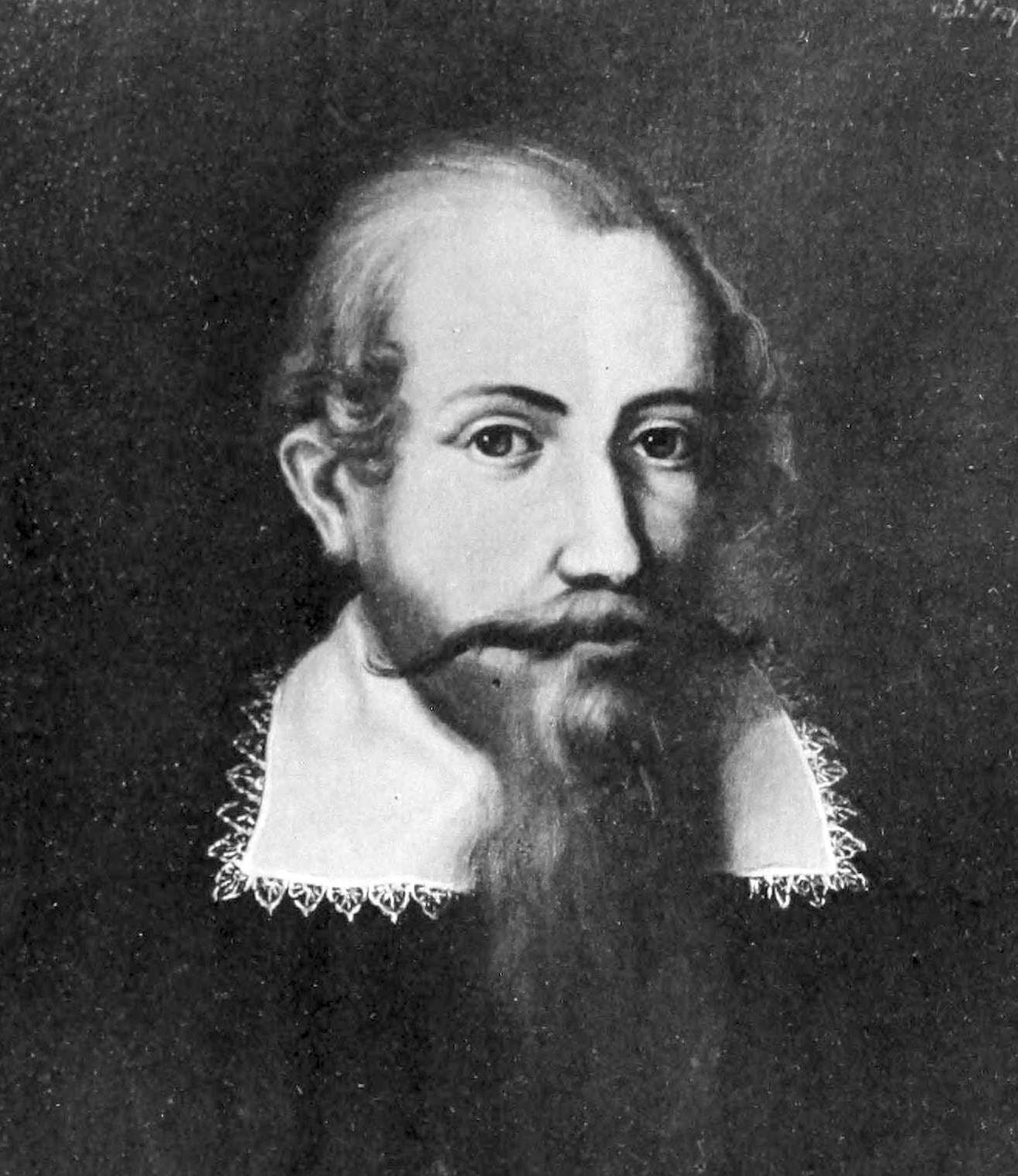
Petrus Kirstenius.

Petrus Kirstenius, latinised form of Peter Kirstein (25 December 1577 – 5 April 1640, age 62) was a physician and orientalist.

He was born in Breslau (today Wrocław, Poland). He studied medicine at Jena, Basel and was the principal of a high school in Wrocław. He held the degrees of Doctor of Medicine and Philosophy. Kirstenius was interested in Oriental languages, and founded an Arabic printer of his own publishing an Arabic grammar book. Later he lived in Prussia but was invited by Axel Oxenstierna to become a personal physician of Queen Christina of Sweden and professor of medicine at Uppsala University in 1636. Petrus Kirstenius died in Uppsala.

His son Johan Peter Kirstenius (1617–1682) was a fortification officer and court engineer in Sweden.

== Sources ==
- Svenskt biografiskt handlexikon I. Stockholm 1906, p. 582.
- Allgemeine Deutsche Biographie. Bd. 16. Leipzig, p. 34-35.
- Gustaf Elgenstierna, Den introducerade svenska adelns ättartavlor. Del IV, p. 128.
