= Julius Micrander =

Julius Erici Micrander Uplandiensis (December 25, 1640 – 1702) was a Swedish professor, member of the Swedish Parliament, and vicar with the Church of Sweden.

== Biography ==
Micrander was born in the rectory of Bro Church in Uppland, Sweden. His father was Ericus Georgi Micranderan, vicar in Tierp parish and his mother was Benedicta Eriksdotter. By age 10, Micrander was a student at Uppsala University. At age 28, he was studying for a master's degree with the De educatione liberorum.

In 1687, Micrander received his second professorship in theology. In 1676, Micrander was appointed as extraordinary professor of Greek, becoming a professor the next year. In 1685, university Chancellor Magnus Gabriel De la Gardie (1622–1686) appointed Micrander professor of theology. Micrander was ordained as a priest in the Church of Sweden and became vicar of Vaksala Church in Uppsala.

He became involved in the Cartesian controversy at the university. Orthodox Aristotelian supporters, such as Micrander, believed that René Descartes's philosophy threatened the purity of the Christian faith. Micrander was influenced by the German theologian Johann Adam Osiander (1622-1697) and published his strongly anti-Cartesian Collegium theologicum in præcipuas Controversies theo Logica habitum Olim in Sweden during 1690.

Micrander was a member of parliament in 1689 (again in 1697). In 1694, he was appointed superintendent of the Diocese of Härnösand in Västernorrland County.
