= La Cueva =

La Cueva is the Spanish word for "cave" and is also used in the surname "de la Cueva". It can also refer to:

== Geography ==
- La Cueva, Dominican Republic, a Dominican village in the Sánchez Ramírez Province
- La Cueva, Mora County, New Mexico, an unincorporated community on the Mora River in Mora County, New Mexico, United States
- La Cueva, Sandoval County, New Mexico
- La Cueva, Santa Fe County, New Mexico
- La Cueva de Roa, a municipality located in the province of Burgos, Castile and León, Spain
- San Pedro de la Cueva (municipality), a municipality in Sonora in north-western Mexico

== Buildings ==
- La Cueva High School, a public high school located in northeast Albuquerque, New Mexico

== Entertainment ==
- La Cueva (film), a 2014 found footage film

== Surname ==
- Beltrán de la Cueva, 1st Duke of Alburquerque
- Francisco Fernández de la Cueva, 2nd Duke of Alburquerque
- Beltrán de la Cueva, 3rd Duke of Alburquerque
- Francisco Fernández de la Cueva, 4th Duke of Alburquerque
- Gabriel de la Cueva, 5th Duke of Alburquerque
- Francisco Fernández de la Cueva, 8th Duke of Alburquerque
- Francisco Fernández de la Cueva, 10th Duke of Alburquerque
- José María de la Cueva, 14th Duke of Alburquerque
- Alfonso de la Cueva, 1st Marquis of Bedmar
- Diego Fernández de la Cueva, 1st Viscount of Huelma
- Baltasar de la Cueva, Count of Castellar
- Gaspar de Ávalos de la Cueva, Spanish Roman Catholic Roman Catholic bishop and cardinal
- Beatriz de la Cueva, Governor of the Spanish colony of Guatemala
- Carmen G. de la Cueva (born 1986), Spanish writer
- Juan de la Cueva, Spanish dramatist and poet
- Jay de la Cueva, Mexican producer, singer, bass player, drummer, guitarist, pianist and songwriter
- Amado de la Cueva, Mexican painter
- Francisco de la Cueva, Spanish philologist, playwright, jurist and writer
- Mario de la Cueva, Mexican jurist and rector of the Universidad Nacional Autónoma de México
