= Walls of Cuéllar =

Defensive walls that surround the old town of Cuéllar, Segovia, Spain

Walled enclosure and castle of Cuéllar
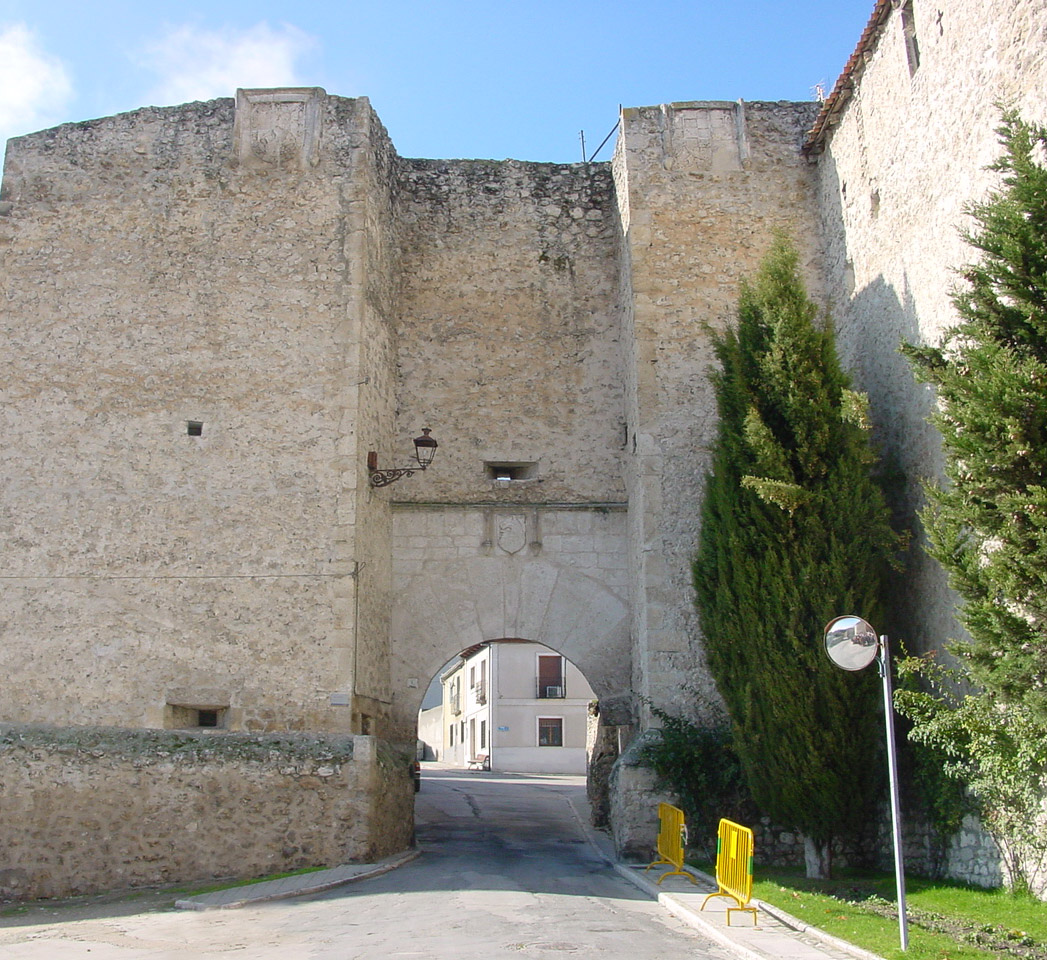

General information
- Type: Monument
- Architectural style: Romanesque, Mudéjar, Gothic
- Location: Cuéllar, Segovia, Spain
- Coordinates: 41.4°N 4.32°W
- Construction started: 11th century
- Construction stopped: 15th century

The Walls of Cuéllar are Romanesque defensive walls that surrounds the old town of the Segovian village of Cuéllar. They represent one of the most important and best preserved walled complexes in the autonomous community of Castile and León (Spain).

The walled complex consists of three distinct enclosures: the city, the citadel and the counter wall. In addition, archaeological remains of a fourth enclosure, now disappeared, have been found. The walls were built in the 11th century and reinforced in the 15th century by Francisco Fernández de la Cueva, 2nd Duke of Alburquerque and lord of the town. Initially they had an overall length of more than 2,000 meters (6,600 ft), of which approximately 1,400 meters (4,600 ft) are preserved. They are one and a half meters (4.9 ft) thick and have an average height of more than five meters (16 ft). Seven of the eleven gates that allowed access to different parts of the town are preserved, among them the arch of San Basilio, in the Mudéjar style.

From the 17th century onwards they ceased to be used for defensive purposes, and interest in their conservation began to wane until, in the 19th century, the most deteriorated sections began to be demolished. This, together with the sinking caused by wear and tear and neglect, led to the loss of a quarter of the walls. In the 1970s, this deterioration began to be halted by rehabilitating different parts.

The last restoration was completed in 2011 thanks to a project of the Ministry of Housing, which, with a budget of 3.4 million euros from European funds, enhanced the complex as a tourist attraction, making some sections of the wall accessible.

The walled enclosure, which bears a strong resemblance to Toledo's 14th-century military architecture, was declared a national artistic monument in 1931, along with Cuéllar Castle, a distinction known as a Bien de Interés Cultural.

== History ==
=== Construction: 10th to 15th centuries ===
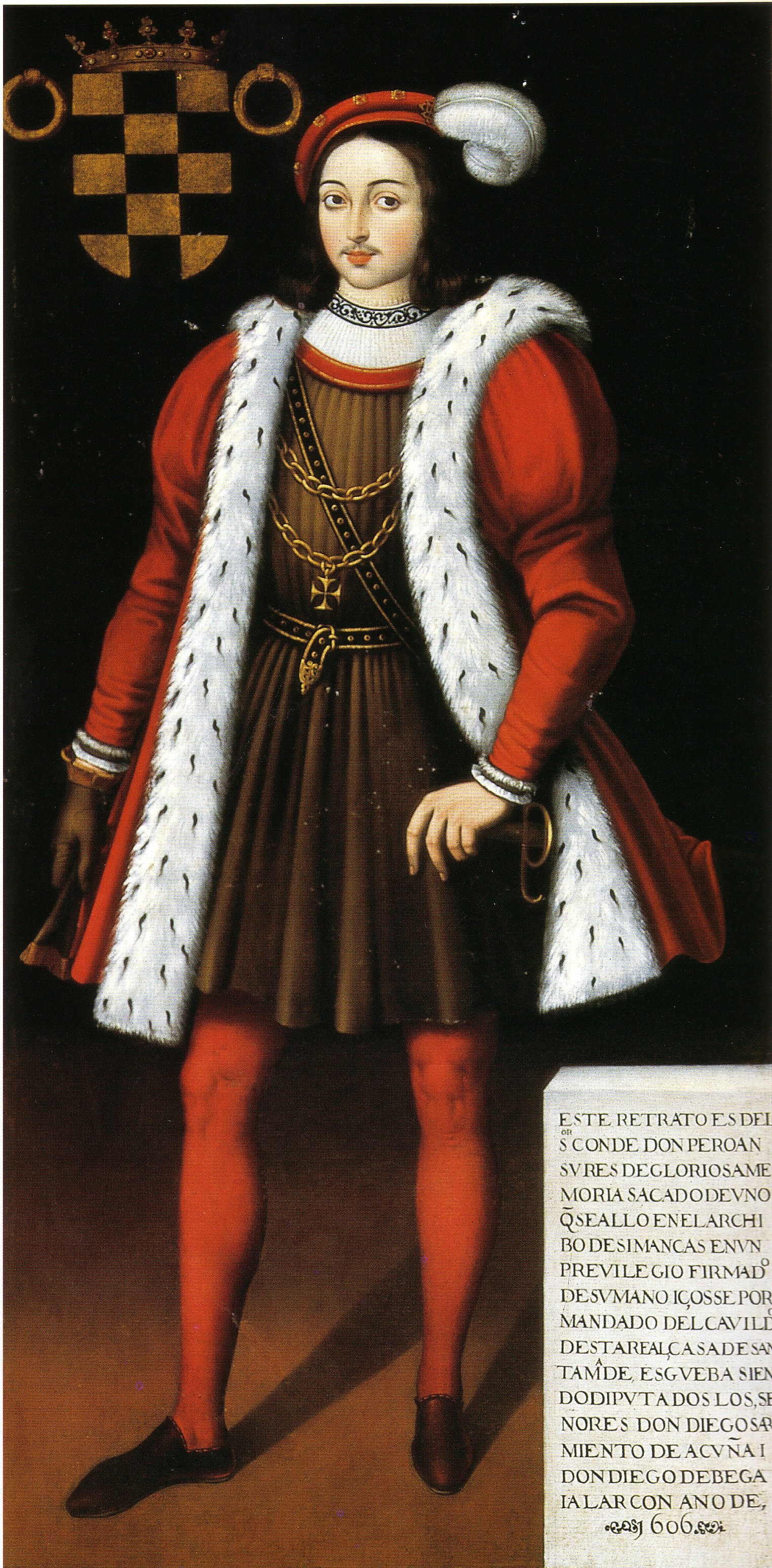
Pedro Ansúrez, repopulator of Cuéllar

The wall was the main element of all the elements of the medieval urban phenomenon. Its presence made possible the existence of a protected hamlet with a certain density, and the fence is the first thing that reveals the rural-urban dichotomy. This initial need for defense was more pronounced in the border regions, as is the case of Cuéllar, on the banks of the Douro River. Like most of the towns created during the repopulation, the town was built in the wilderness, seeking small hills to defend itself. The wall runs through them, fortifying its highest part, so that its layout obeys a topographical conditioning, adapting to the terrain.

The Walls of Cuéllar have their origin in the Early Middle Ages, when the definitive repopulation of the town took place, entrusted by Alfonso VI of Castile to Count Pedro Ansúrez. The beginning of its construction can be dated from the year 1085, during this repopulation, as attested by the oldest remains of the wall that have been found, located in the castle and dating from the 11th century. This construction was extended throughout the 12th and especially the 13th centuries.

The first documented record dates from 29 April 1264. It is a document of Alfonso X the Wise in which he granted, at the request of the council of Cuéllar, that the collection of certain fines be used to repair the Walls of Cuéllar:

And because they ask us for mercy that the caloñas that make those who enter the council exidos, that we give them to you for the benefit of your council. For our good and mercy, knowing that the walls of the town and also the bridges that you have a great deal to do are for the benefit and protection of you, and that they are things that you have much to serve, and that you cannot avoid, we have the good pleasure that the coves that are for the reason of the exidos be for the aforementioned things.

Once again, the town council asked a monarch, this time Henry II of Castile in 1374, to grant the inheritances located in the town that had belonged to Juana de Castro for the repair of the walls, a request that was not accepted by the king. The proof of the town's interest in its walls can be deduced from another new petition, this time to the Infante Don Ferdinand, who granted a license to the council on 13 February 1403 to repair the walls, and for this purpose all the residents of Walls of Cuéllar and its Land, without distinction of status, had to pay 30,000 maravedís:

...license so that you can repair the walls that are necessary for it, know that it pleases me to do so. And so I command you and give you license by this my letter so that the said things may be repaired and repaired by all the inhabitants and dwellers in this said town and its land thirty thousand eight hundred maravedís and that all the inhabitants and dwellers in this said town and its land, both clerics and laymen, knights and squires and duennas and maidens, pay.

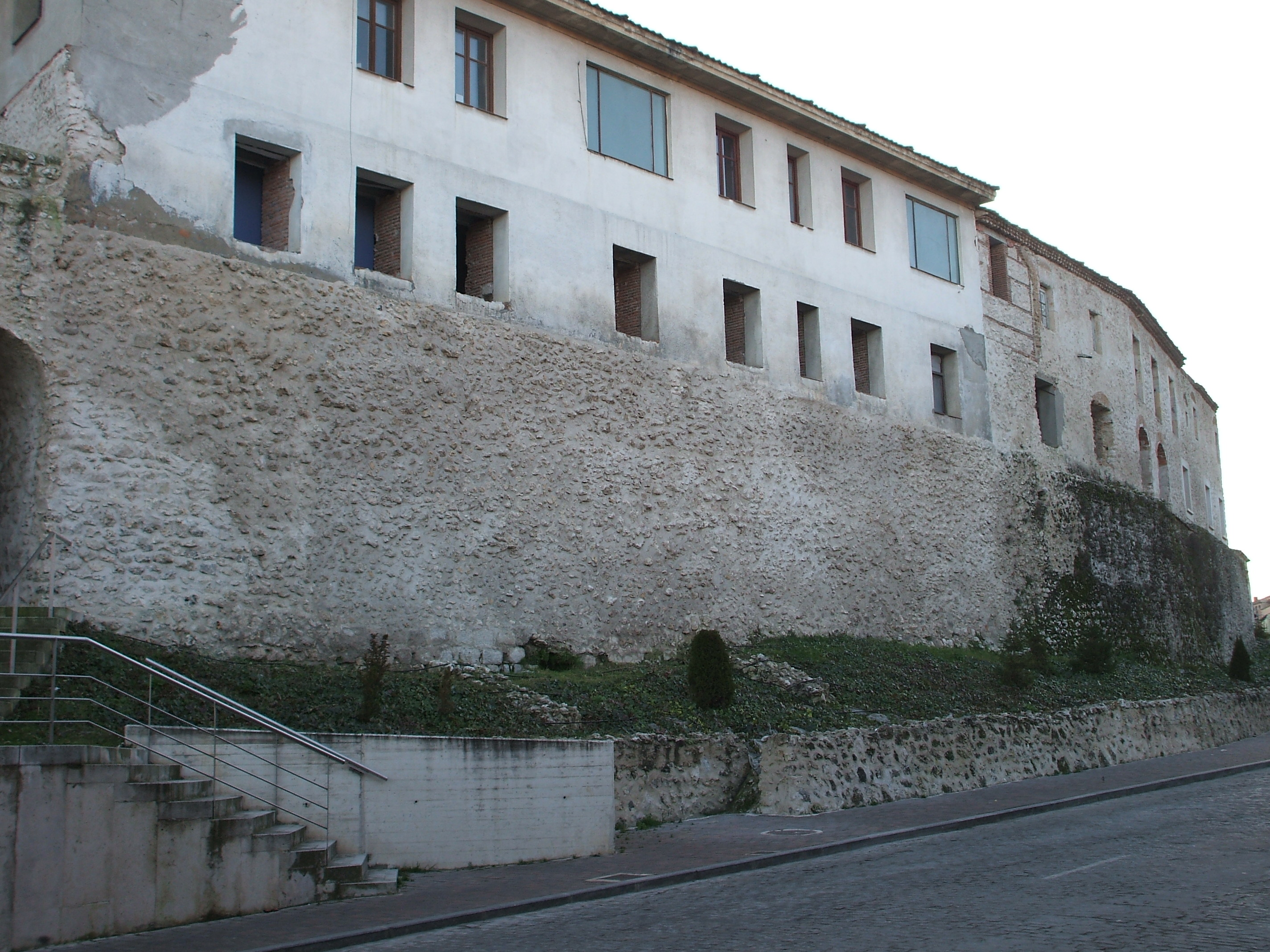
Hospital de la Magdalena, built on the wall.

In 1427, following the council's concern to strengthen and restore its defensive walls, John II of Aragon, who was then lord of the town, signed a document in Valladolid addressed to the council to authorize the archdeacon Gómez González to build the Hospital de la Magdalena, one of his foundations, attached to the wall, while leaving the city walls and their defense intact, but breaking part of the wall. Apparently there was prior authorization, but the council, concerned about the defense of the city, later opposed the works. The archdeacon had to request permission again from the king, who replied that he should be allowed to complete the building. Finally, the archdeacon did not comply with what the lord of the town imposed on him, and did not respect the chemin de ronde, as he literally leaned the building on it, leaving no option for the promenade.

=== Reforms of the 16th century ===
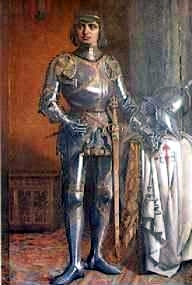
Beltrán de la Cueva in a painting of the 19th century

The walls were rebuilt and enlarged during the 14th and 15th centuries for defensive purposes. When Beltrán de la Cueva arrived at the manor of Cuéllar in 1464, the Romanesque walls were in good condition, but at the same time that he carried out the enlargement of the castle, he also reinforced the rest of the fortifications. Thus, in 1471 he enlarged the north wall to raise the wall and the barbican. At the same time, he strengthened the first wall of the first enclosure that runs from the Arch of San Basilio to the nearest wall of the castle.

At this time the Catholic Monarchs initiated a general program of inspection and repair of walls in Castilian cities in which they urged lords, priors, masters and corregidores of the towns to report on the situation of the same through master architects, and how many maravedis were to be spent for their restoration, so it is possible that the works carried out by the first duke were due to the campaign of walls that the monarchs carried out.

After Beltrán's death in 1492, his son and successor Francisco Fernández de la Cueva, 2nd Duke of Alburquerque and 2nd Lord of the town, carried out the most important reforms of the complex, following the guidelines set by his father. The works began around 1500 and their main purpose was to reinforce the existing walls to defend his rights over the town against a possible attack by his stepmother, María de Velasco, who considered that she had rights over it. (Note: María de Velasco was the third wife of Beltrán de la Cueva, 1st Duke of Alburquerque, after being widowed by Juan Pacheco. After the death of Beltrán de la Cueva in 1492, his widow tried to take possession of the town, alleging a series of rights conferred in her marriage, although in reality Cuéllar was linked in the first marriage of Beltrán de la Cueva to the entailed estate of Alburquerque, while for the third marriage and his descendants it was linked to Roa. Finally the 2nd Duke got her to renounce her possible rights to the town, and to take Roa as her father agreed.) Half the cost of the works was paid for by the duke, something unusual, since the payment for this type of renovation was paid for by the population, not the lord.

The works carried out by the 2nd Duke began by strengthening the first enclosure, from the Church of San Esteban to the Arch of San Martín, and from there to the Arch of Santiago, raising its walls and endowing it with battlements and merlons with arrowslits. He also intervened in the Arch of San Pedro, giving the apse of his church a military appearance, and placed his coat of arms, as he did in all the gates of the citadel enclosure that he reinforced.

=== Abandonment: 17th to 19th centuries ===
From the 17th and especially the 18th century, the walls ceased to be a main building, becoming a second plane for the population. This disuse caused it to gradually weaken, and a period of abandonment began for the complex that led to the loss of part of the walled route. The initiative taken in the 15th century by the Lord of Cuéllar to allow building on the Walls of Cuéllar led to the massive construction of buildings attached to it, and in 1587 Juan de Ortelano was authorized to build a house next to the Walls of San Pedro; another authorization came in the mid-17th century to do the same next to the Arch of San Martín. The process of building by loading beams on the walls caused great deterioration to them, because to obtain greater amplitude they were lowered on the inside, and many windows and other spaces were opened, thus breaking the neatness and firmness they had possessed.

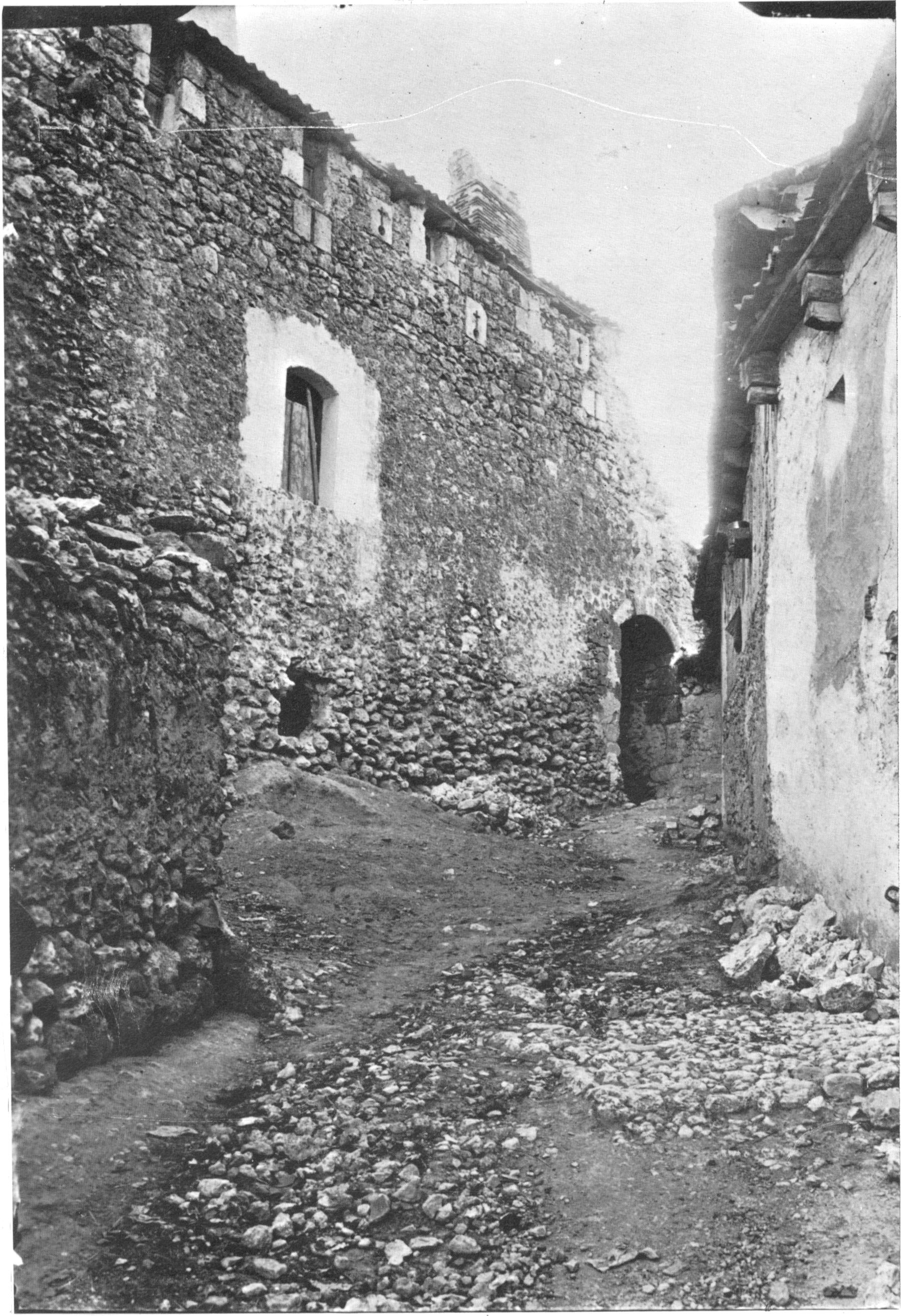
Puerta de la Judería at the end of the 19th century, where we can see the use of the battlements as windows and other openings directly in the wall

In the middle of this century the population dismantled some sections of the wall to reuse the stone in their houses, to which the council responded with lawsuits and fines, as happened in 1649. In the 18th century, the outer arch of the Puerta de Carchena had to be demolished, leaving only the strongest one, the inner one. Also in danger of collapse was the Arch of La Trinidad in 1777, whose wall had already lost its battlements in a previous collapse.

The walls belonged to the Duke of Alburquerque as lord of the town. After the abolition of the lordships in 1811, they remained in the possession of the Ducal House. That same year, the Ducal House underwent one of the most important changes in its history when the 14th Duke died in London without a successor to inherit his House, definitively extinguishing the lineage of La Cueva in the duchy. After a long litigation of nineteen years, the House of Alburquerque fell to the Osorio family, Marquises of Alcañices and Los Balbases, in the person of Nicolás Osorio y Zayas, defender of the Liberal Revolution.

The new Duke of Alburquerque totally disassociated himself from Cuéllar, a land he had inherited from his ancestors but with which he had no sentimental or historical relationship, since he inherited the House through the female line, (Note: Nicolás Osorio y Zayas was recognized as successor to the House of Alburquerque because he was the grandson of María Dominga Spínola de la Cueva, wife of the 14th Marquis of Alcañices, and daughter of Ana Catalina de la Cueva y de la Cerda, 6th Countess of La Torre, daughter in turn of Francisco Fernández de la Cueva, 10th Duke of Alburquerque, and Juana de la Cerda y Aragón, his wife (Portal Grandes de España: Genealogy of the Duchy of Alburquerque).) thus beginning the greatest deterioration of the walls, and causing the most significant blow to the enclosure. In 1842 the wall next to the Estudio de Gramática (Grammar School) threatened to fall into ruin and the town council communicated the situation to the new Duke, who did not want to undertake its restoration. The same year it was agreed to remove the doors of the Arches of San Andrés and Carchena to prevent their weight from contributing to the collapse of the arches. Years later, those of the Arch of La Trinidad were also removed, which were appraised at 320 reales and placed in the corral of the inn.

In 1858 the collapse of another wall next to the Arch of Santiago was reported and, in the same area, there was a collapse in November 1859. These collapses alarmed the town authorities and the legal question of the ownership of the walls came to the forefront of municipal affairs, since if the Duke of Alburquerque, who considered himself the owner of the walls, did not intervene in them, (Note: The Duke of Alburquerque was the one who authorized and prevented the construction of houses attached to the wall, among other functions. (Hernández Montero (2006, p. 47)) the town council had to take a measure to prevent the population from continuing to be in danger. Various jurists were consulted on the legality of the ducal possession of the walls, and their answer was categorical: since the jurisdictional lordships were abolished, the duke could not be considered the owner of the walls and, after various formalities, the duke was obliged to renounce his rights, and from then on the ownership of the walled enclosure passed to the town council.

After this, the provincial authorities intervened in the matter and sent a public works draughtsman to draw up a report on the condition of the wall, in which he pointed out four areas in serious danger: the section between the Arches of Santiago and Las Cuevas; from the Hospital de las Llagas to the Arch of San Martín; from the Arch of Carchena to the Arch of San Pedro and, finally, the area around the Arch of La Trinidad and the Arch of La Trinidad itself. In view of this report, the town council ordered the neighbors who owned the houses attached to these sections of the wall in danger to vacate their homes, as well as the removal of debris. A new report was made in 1868 in which the demolition of the sections of wall that were in danger was ordered, accompanied by an estimate of expenses and the way in which it should be done, although the dismantling of the walls was not done immediately, but was carried out over several years. Finally, in 1873 a section of wall next to the arch of La Trinidad collapsed, with the few remains of its battlements disappearing.

=== Demolition: 20th century ===
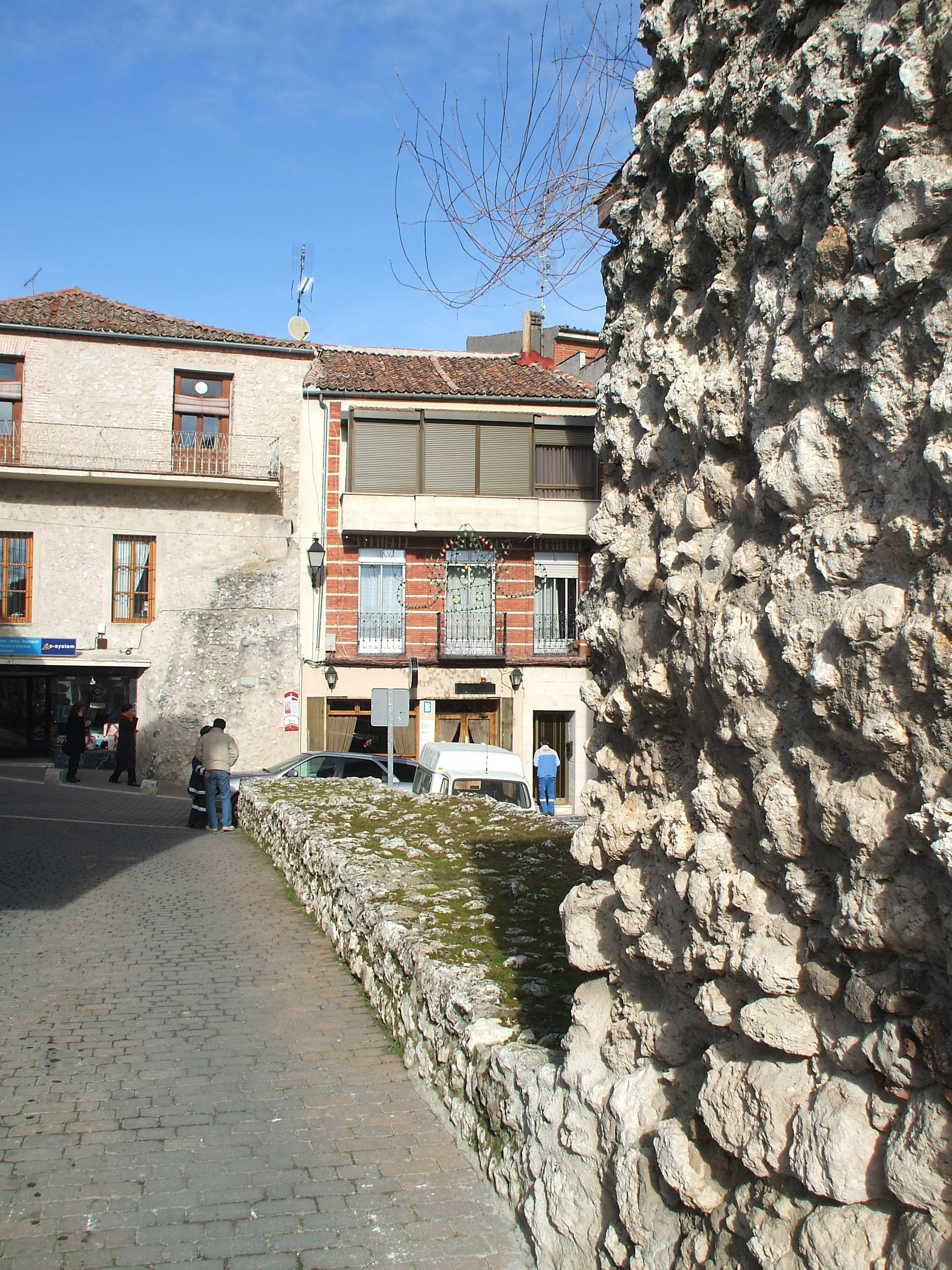
Wall that closed with the Arch of Carchena. You can still see part of its tower attached to the buildings.

The new ownership did not bring any benefit to the monument because, due to the economic scarcity of the city council and the ruinous state of the walls, they did not begin to be restored until the beginning of the 20th century, after the demolitions indicated in the reports were carried out in the last third of the 19th century, due to the fact that the cost of restoration was greater than the cost of demolition. In 1873 the Arch of Carchena was demolished, and a year later part of the wall on the streets of Barrera and Herreros collapsed. A new and spectacular collapse in the area in 1878, in which the large wall that enveloped these streets disappeared for good, brought the state of the walls back into the spotlight. The report pointed out several dangerous points: the stretch of wall next to the Arch of Santiago, the streets of Barrera, Magdalena, San Julián, Herreros and the Arch of La Trinidad. In 1879 the demolition of the wall of Herreros Street began, and on 12 July of the same year the town council agreed to demolish the arch and the wall of Trinidad. (Note: It was agreed that the extracted stone would be used to repair the streets, which were paved (Rodrigo Criado (2002, p. 13)) In 1884 the Arch of Carchena was eliminated, as well as one of the archways of the Arch of San Andrés. On 19 December 1891 it was forbidden to obtain stone and earth from the slope of the wall of the castle, and in 1895 the Arch of San Pedro was demolished, which not only reduced the danger, but also allowed the widening of the street as a matter of ornament and arrangement of the public thoroughfare, as is justified by the municipal records. At that time the Arch of Las Cuevas must also have been demolished, although there is no record of the date.

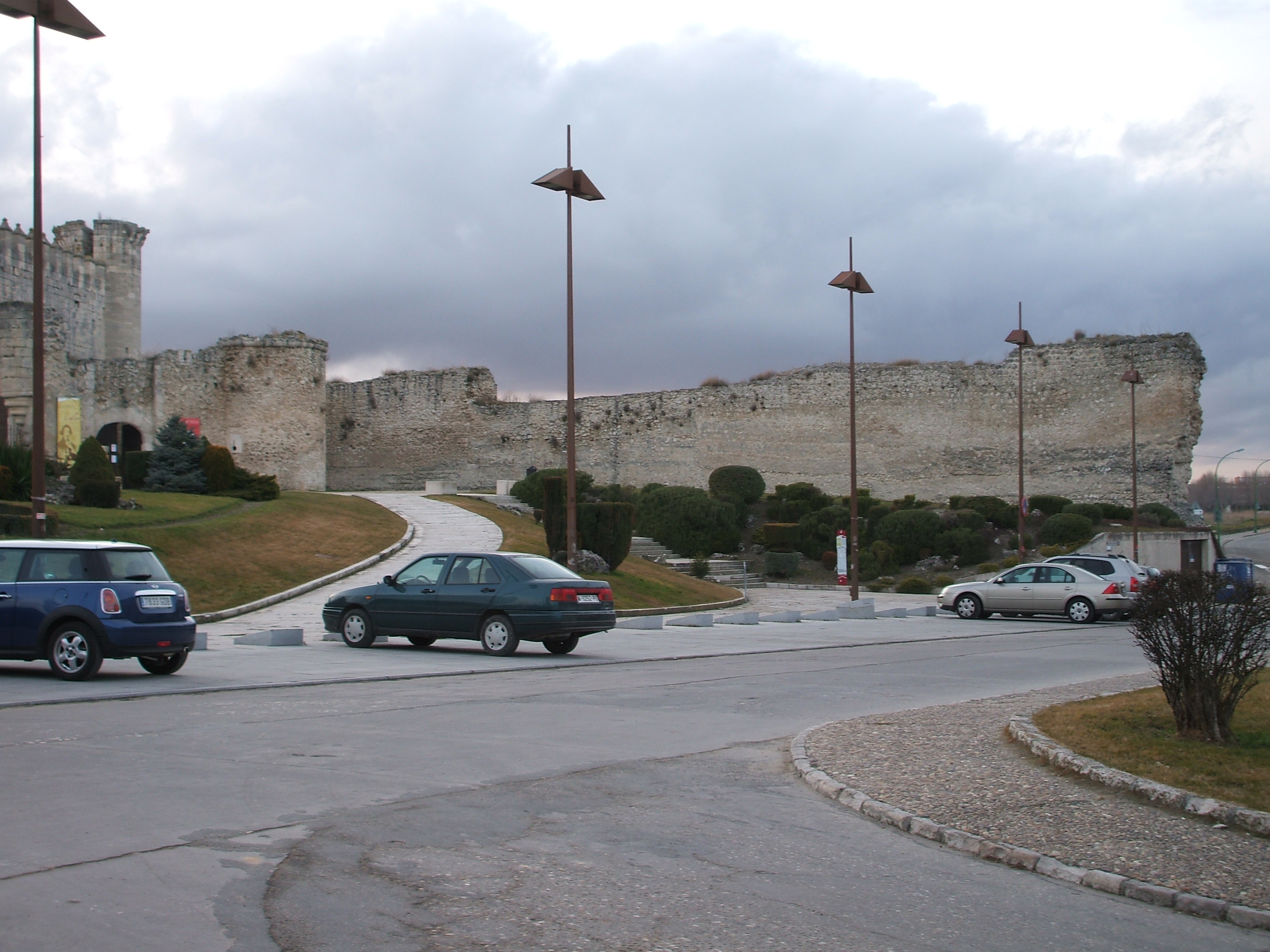
The lowering of the wall next to the castle was carried out by the prisoners in the 1940s to reuse the stone.

During the first decades of the 20th century, the walls began to gradually lose stability. Between 1923 and 1924 the town council began to allocate small sums of money for its restoration, as it did between 1931 and 1932, works that continued after it was declared a Conjunto Histórico-Artístico (Historic-Artistic Grouping) in 1931.

In the 1940s, during the period when the castle was a prison, one of the works of the prisoners consisted of reducing the height of the wall in the northern part of the castle by two meters, overlooking the road to Valladolid, to use the stone for the construction of the disappeared antituberculosis sanatorium located to the south of the castle.

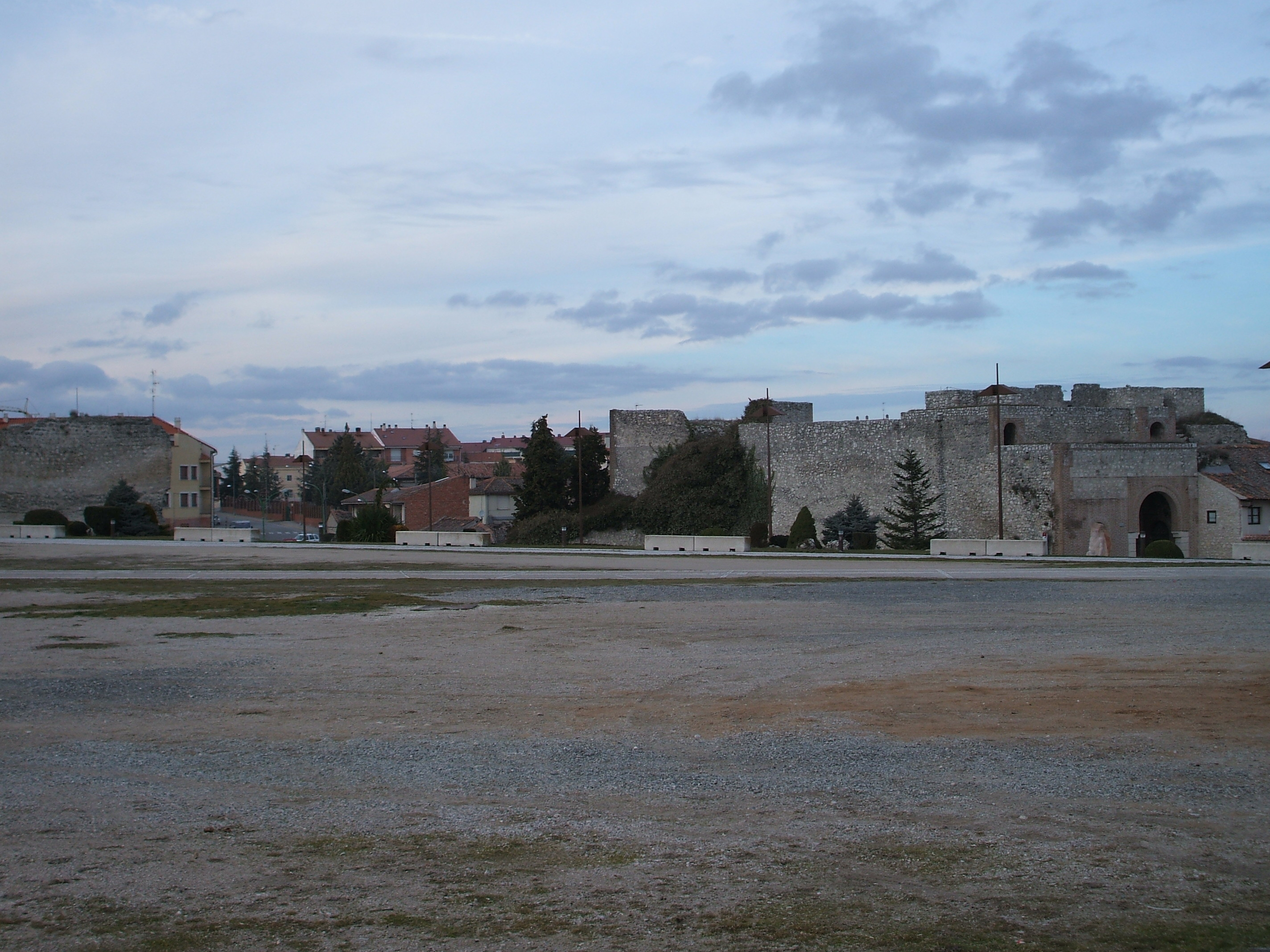
Section of the wall between the castle and the Arch of San Basilio, where you can see the intermediate wall demolished to create a wider access.

In 1955 a large section of the wall between the Arch of San Basilio and the castle was demolished to provide a wider access to Palace Street than that provided by the aforementioned arch. This large-scale intervention was strongly criticized by the residents of the town for several reasons. In the first place, because of the attack on the heritage that the intervention entailed, to which the municipal corporation responded that a small passageway already existed, from a subsidence suffered centuries before, and that it had only been enlarged with a minor demolition, a fact that is corroborated by photographs taken before the demolition, although it was a very narrow passageway at one end and of minimal size, nothing to do with the one visible after the intervention, in which approximately eight meters of wall disappeared. Thousands of cubic meters of earth had to be moved to carry out the intervention, since the ground level inside the citadel was higher than outside.

Public complaints became louder when the neighbors understood the situation: the new open access allowed the entry and exit of large trucks to the esplanade of the castle, where a chicory factory owned by the acting mayor, Felipe Suarez, was located, which caused great commotion in the village. Indeed, the size of the Arch of San Basilio did not allow the entry of large trucks, and it was even common for the smaller ones to get stuck in the door during their attempts. The new entrance allowed the factory to load and unload directly from inside, saving the work of the forklift drivers who until then had had to move the merchandise by hand outside the enclosure to load it.

On 14 December 1960, the Town Council authorized the demolition of a wall panel in the lower part of the town, which closed the enclosure of the city with the disappeared Arch of San Pedro. The demolition also included a manor house belonging to the Hinestrosa family, which at the time was considered the birthplace of Diego Velázquez de Cuéllar, first governor of Cuba.

=== Recovery attempt: 20th century ===
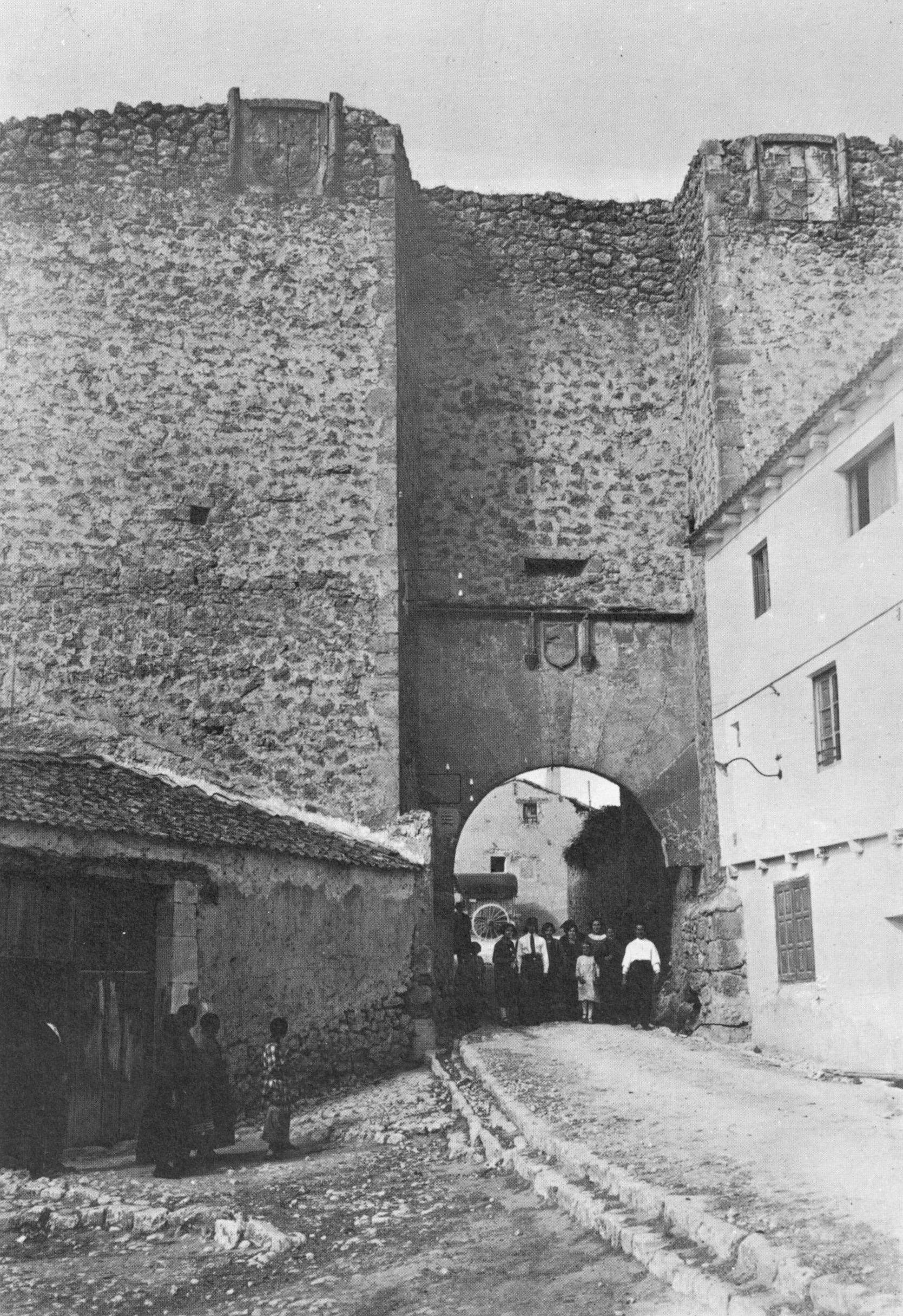
Terraced houses on both sides of the Arch of San Martín at the beginning of the 20th century, removed in 1977

In the 1970s the walls began to recover their historical interest, and the administration showed its concern through successive small-scale restorations. Thus, on 19 February 1972, the financial institution Caja Segovia made a donation of 350,000 pesetas for the restoration of the Arch of San Basilio, a work for which the Provincial Council of Segovia contributed another 100,000 pesetas, which was carried out by a Workshop School through the Cuéllar Town Council.

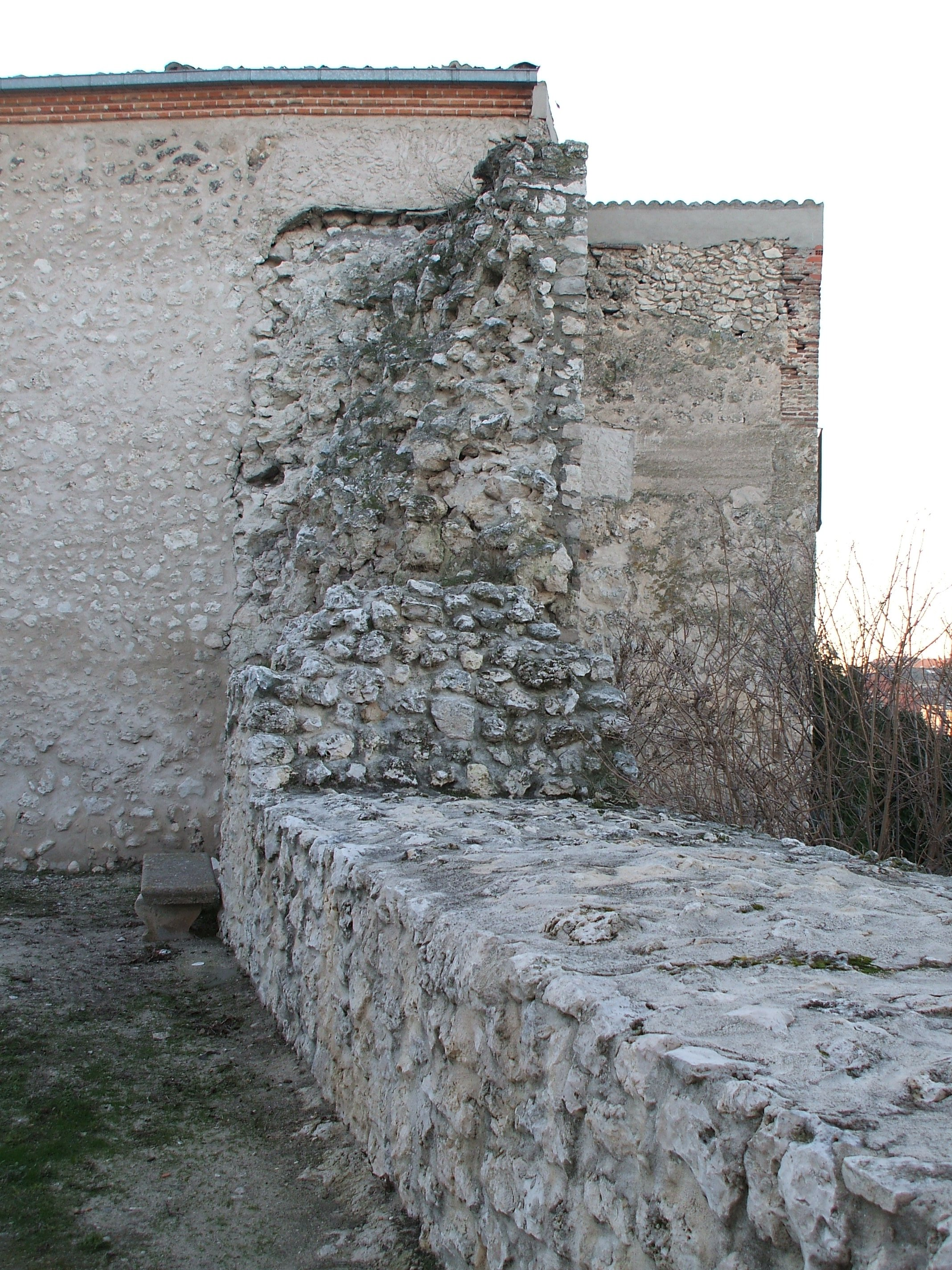
Wall section illegally demolished in front of the Plaza de San Gil in 1998. Behind it, the Torreón de los Daza.

On 4 February 1977, part of the tower of the Arch of Santiago collapsed, and was immediately restored by the General Directorate of Fine Arts, although the criteria used did not restore the tower to its original structure, since its height was considerably reduced. At the same time, the town council acquired some houses attached to the wall on Muralla Street, and another in the same condition next to the Arch of San Martín, to demolish them to expose the corresponding sections of wall. Likewise, the Ministry of Culture, through the General Directorate of Fine Arts, restored the Arch of San Andrés in that decade, and later the interior section of wall that joins the Arch of San Martín with the Arch of Santiago. At the beginning of 1986, the town council again bought another building adjacent to the wall in the southwest area, between Carchena and Los Herreros streets, freeing up another section, although its restoration was controversial, since they only kept one meter of height in the wall, reducing some sections.

Between 1988 and 1989, the Cuéllar Town Council, through a Workshop School, rehabilitated the southern wall of the Huerta del Duque, which had large holes that resembled artillery impacts and threatened to collapse on the park. The work involved 225 m in a surface area of 800 m² for which 630 m³ of stone were used. During the restoration, a Mudéjar postern was discovered, a kind of false door that had not been known about before.

On 2 November 1998, during the works carried out in the Plaza de San Gil, which consisted of eliminating the buildings attached to the wall and subsequently building a new tourist office, a section of wall measuring 11 m long x 4.5 m high x 2.20 m wide was illegally demolished, justified as an accidental collapse, After several reports, it was concluded that the demolition had been provoked, and for this reason the Junta of Castile and Leon opened an administrative file against the town council, which ignored the recommendations of the technicians of the Territorial Heritage Commission months before the works were executed. Finally, the town council was ordered to pay 8 million pesetas, on the grounds that the building had been demolished on its own initiative.

Despite the fact that months later the Heritage Commission approved its restoration to raise the section of the wall again, this was not done, but rather it was used as a lookout, outlining in straight lines the remains that were left. In addition, the height of the section of wall on which the new building was built was reduced by 7 m in length and almost 1.5 m in height, thus extracting more than 13 m³ of stone from the wall.

At the end of the summer of 2002, a major restoration of the Walls of Cuéllar located on Nueva Street, on which the Hospital de la Magdalena is located, was carried out through an agreement between the Town Council of Cuéllar, the Ministry of Labor and the National Institute of Employment, whose works were financed by the European Community through the European Social Fund.

=== 21st century: complete restoration ===
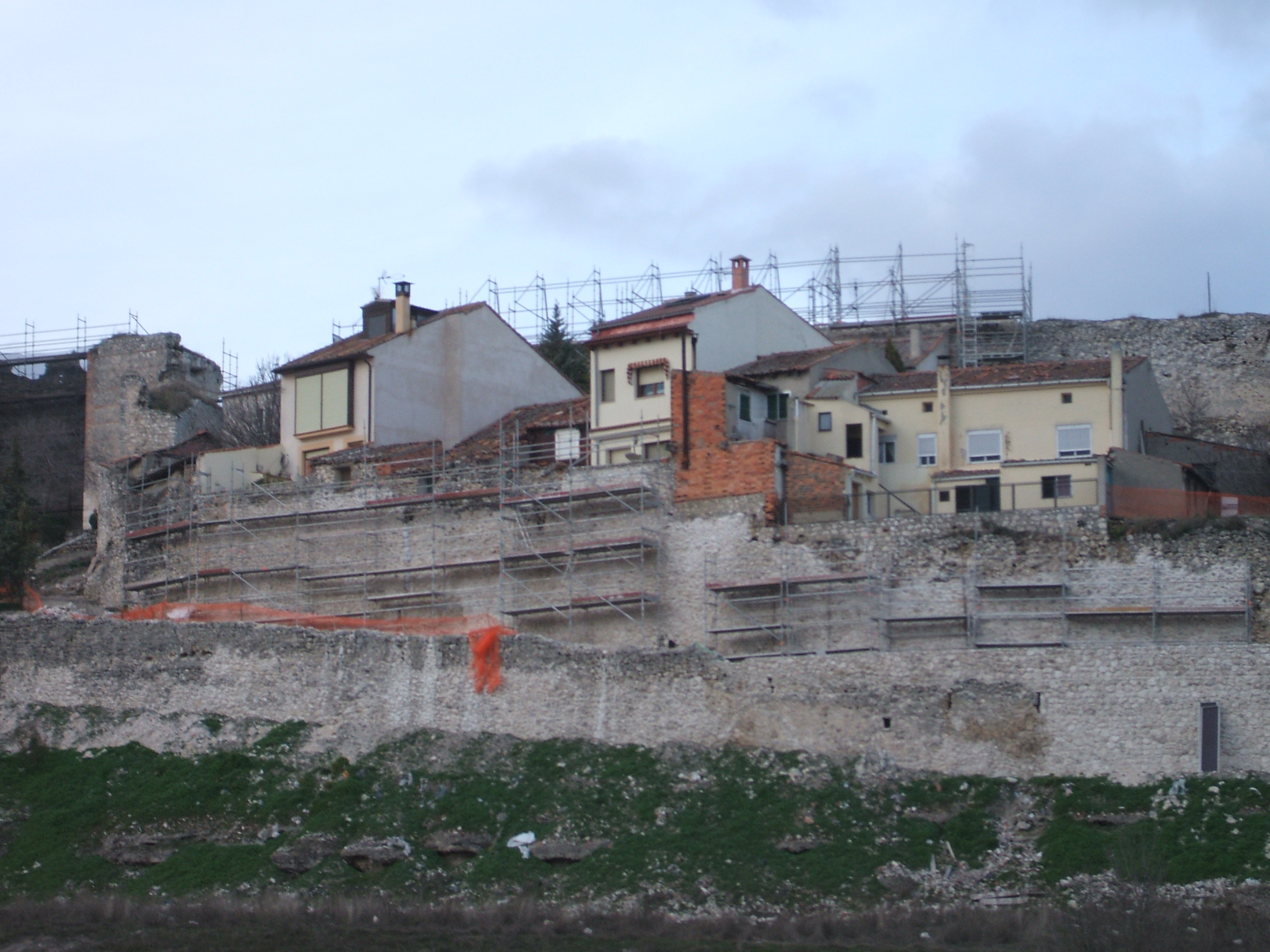
Wall section near the Arch of Las Cuevas in the middle of restoration

In the year 2000, negotiations began to carry out an extensive restoration of the complex, through a project financed by the Spanish Government, which consisted of a strict cataloguing and description of the different wall sections of both enclosures, and pursued a European line of funding, the European Economic Area, through which the viability of the restoration was achieved.

The works were awarded on 15 February 2008 and began two months later, with an approximate budget of 3.4 million euros and an extension during 2009, 2010 and 2011. The project made it possible to undertake the restoration and consolidation of the walled complex in a joint and orderly manner in different phases of action.

Most of the walls were rebuilt, recovering the walkway and the battlements, incorporating accesses and making part of the citadel enclosure accessible to the public, as a tourist attraction. Excavations were carried out in the moat of the castle, to achieve the original levels of the castle, and the citadel wall was closed at both ends in which it is divided, as well as the reconstruction of the wall of the Plaza de San Gil. As part of the same plan, the exterior of the west wing of the castle was restored, and the rehabilitation of the Hospital de la Magdalena as a youth hostel was incorporated into the plan.

To carry out the restoration of some sections of the wall, the Cuéllar Town Council acquired several plots of land and buildings attached to the wall to free it and allow a wider view of the wall. As a general criterion, efforts were made to maintain the original finish whenever possible, since the ultimate goal of the project was to recover the defenses, enhance their value and make them visitable in the most important part of their layout.

The works were completed in the summer of 2011, with a final budget of 3,538,286 euros, contributed in full by the Spanish Ministry of Development through the program for the Recovery of Elements and Enclosures of Defensive Architecture of the Secretary of State for Housing and Urban Actions. Finally, they were inaugurated and opened to the public on 22 November of the same year, and in less than two months more than 5,000 visitors were recorded.

== Description ==
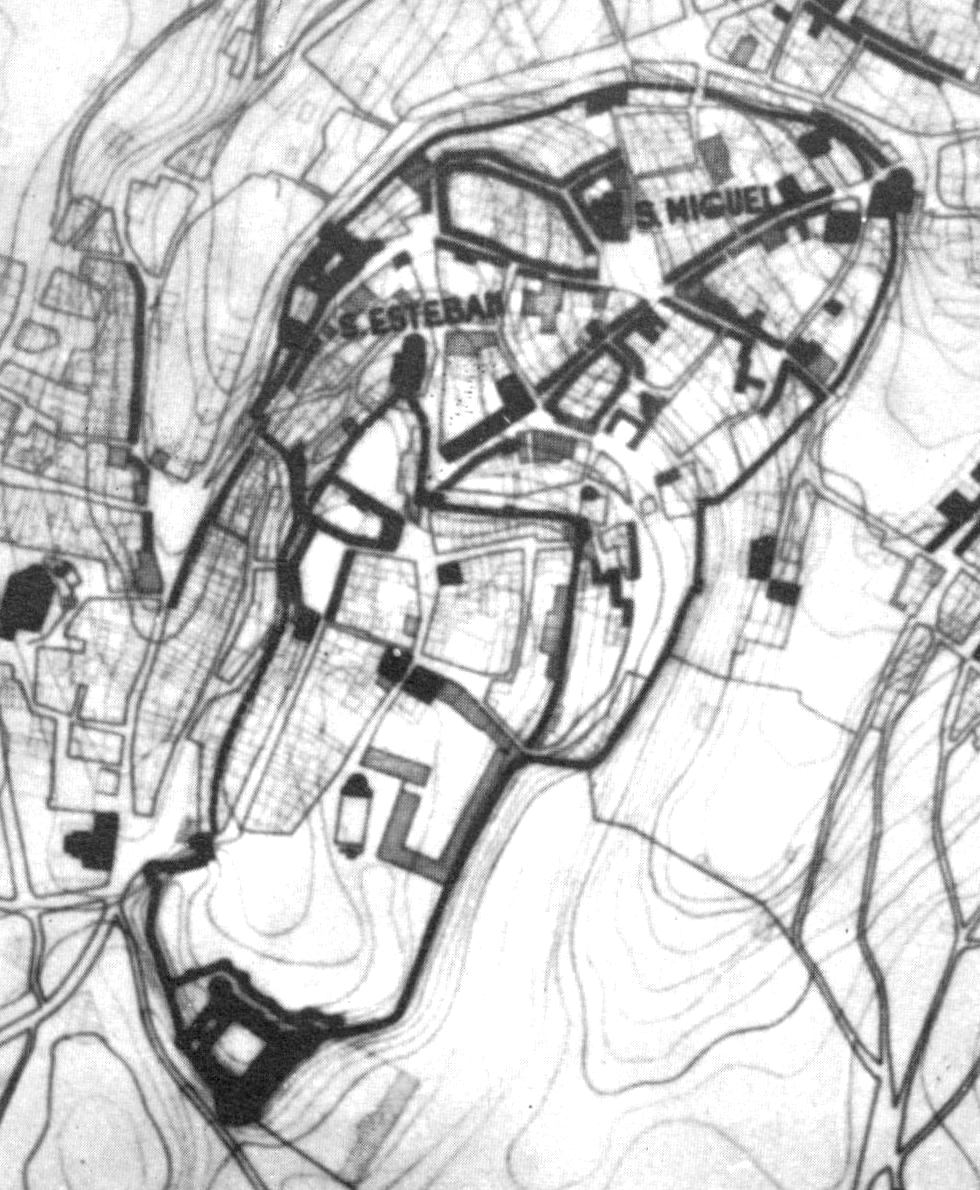
Plan of the walled enclosure of Cuéllar in a 19th-century plan

At present, the wall has a total perimeter that exceeds 1,400 meters, of the more than 2,000 meters of the original wall, so that three-quarters of it are preserved. It delimits an area of approximately 14 hectares, and is perfectly integrated with the castle, which is the main defensive bastion of the town.

The wall is composed of two different enclosures joined together: the citadel and the city. They are approximately one and a half meters thick and more than 5 meters high. The plan that delimits its walls can be likened to an elliptical shape; at its two ends and reinforcing the perimeter in its most vulnerable places, two constructions stand out: to the west the Castle, and on the eastern flank the Church of San Pedro, with its late medieval apse projected outside the walled enclosure, similar to that of the Ávila Cathedral (known there as the cimorro), and with a solid buttressed top.

The materials used are mainly lime and rubble stone, with some Mudéjar touches in the tower of the Arch of Las Cuevas, the Arch of San Andrés, the Tower of the Daza family, the Arch of San Basilio and the south door of the castle. The walls are built with a succession of rows of irregularly shaped stones, not carved, and joined together with lime. At the present time only some sections of the wall conserve their crenellation, and almost all of the chemin de ronde or defense through which the soldiers passed has been lost. There are also remains of arrowslits and machicolations, mainly in the area around the Arch of San Martín. We do not know what the Arches of Las Cuevas (possibly Mudéjar, judging by its tower), La Trinidad and Carchena were like.

The citadel seems to follow the ancient fortifications of the Celtiberian hillfort destroyed by the Romans; on the other hand, it resembles the constructions of the Muslim citadels. As in the defensive complexes of other cities, also in Cuéllar the churches served as a finishing touch to the walls, thus the Church of San Esteban and the Church of Santiago were part of the citadel, and San Pedro was part of the city.

=== Citadel wall ===
In the highest part of the hill on which Cuéllar rises, is located the first walled enclosure, called the citadel, which delimits an area separated from the rest of the village. It is the first walled enclosure of the town, which was later extended downhill as a result of urban sprawl. It covers approximately two-fifths of the total walled area, and is characterized by its higher location, its proximity to the castle, and its lower density of buildings, which is due in part to the extensive esplanade located in front of the castle.

It started from the castle itself, and crossed the Huerta del Duque through a long wall that only lacks the battlement, which was still preserved in the mid-nineteenth century, cut halfway through the Mudéjar gateway of the castle. This wall is topped by a quadrangular tower with Mudéjar decoration, which formed part of the defense of the disappeared Arch of Las Cuevas. It is possible that at this point another gateway was opened to give entrance to the city just in front of the disappeared Arch of Las Cuevas, since it belonged to the citadel.

From Las Cuevas street the wall continued its route to the Arch of Santiago, whose tower was at the same time the belfry of the church of the same name, attached to the wall. From this point started one of the strongest sections of the enclosure that still retains part of its battlements, was defended by an intermediate tower of quadrangular shape that is located in perfect condition, and ended in the very strong Arch of San Martin. Once there, the wall made a break in accordance with the line of the terrain, heading towards the rear of the Church of San Esteban, leaving it outside the enclosure and taking advantage of its apse as a bastion in advance of the wall, which was to be closed behind the Estudio de Gramática. The section of the wall that joins the School with the door of the Judería is one of the best preserved. As was the case with the Arch of Las Cuevas, this is the starting point of the city wall in search of the Arch of San Andrés. From the Judería the wall started again to meet the castle, also strengthened by another tower similar to those mentioned, now dismantled and called Torreón de los Daza, for being attached to the ancestral home of this noble family located in the Plaza de San Gil. The wall reached the Arch of San Basilio through a wall that has practically disappeared today, and from it another wall that was demolished to cross a street in 1955 and that finally died in the castle.

The citadel was almost impregnable, and it was difficult to penetrate the city walls. There were also external defenses that guarded the valley. Within the enclosure were integrated five access doors, through which access was gained from the different suburbs that made up the population; only four are preserved, having disappeared the so-called Arch of Las Cuevas. In addition, the Churches of San Esteban and Santiago became defensive bulwarks to close off this first walled enclosure.

==== Access gates ====
This enclosure contained five interior gates that communicated the citadel with the rest of the city. The Arch of San Basilio is oriented towards the road to Valladolid, Olmedo and Medina del Campo. San Martín, the most central, joined the esplanade of the castle with the important Plaza del Mercado del Pan; the Arch of Santiago allowed access from the La Morería neighborhood to the upper part of the town; further north is the gate of the Judería. Finally, the Arch of Las Cuevas provided access to the southernmost part of the city.

- Arch of San Basilio. Initially called Puerta del Robledo, from the 17th century it adopted the name of the monastery founded in front of it, under the patronage of St. Basil of Caesarea. It is the direct access gate to the citadel enclosure, located in the northwest, and consists of a small fortress flanked by a turned cube and a rectangular keep between which is located the chemin de ronde, over a triple ring arch. Its construction is a combination of masonry and brick, with Mudéjar work in the arcades and the tower, which is similar to the Mudéjar style of Toledo. The door is crowned by a triple armorial composed of the arms of Cueva and Toledo on the sides, and the arms of the Council of Cuéllar in the center.
- Puerta de la Judería. It was so named because it was integrated into the Jewish quarter of the town. It is the gate that communicated both enclosures, and its size is the smallest of all. Unlike the rest that are preserved, this gate does not contain towers or other defensive buildings, and is excavated directly into the wall, without protruding from the wall.
- Arch of San Martín. Located to the east of the wall, it was already called this in 1437, when Frederic, Count of Luna, took possession of the town in front of this arch. The gate is flanked by two rectangular towers bearing the shields of the House of Alburquerque, arms of La Cueva and Toledo. Also noteworthy are the voussoirs under which is framed the coat of arms of the town council, which crowns the door.
- Arch of Santiago. Name adopted from the church next to it. It is, along with the Puerta de la Judería, the smallest of the set, because it is, so to speak, a pedestrian gate, since its small size prevented the passage of the possible enemy cavalry, if it had managed to cross the city wall. Its defensive tower was at the same time the bell tower of the adjacent church, just as the apse of the church allowed the defense of the arch before it was taken. It collapsed in 1977 and was immediately restored, although it lost much of its height.
- Arch of Las Cuevas. The design of its construction is unknown, but judging by the preserved quadrangular tower with Mudéjar decoration, it is possible that this art was extended to the complex. In 1858 it was already in a state of ruin and had to be demolished around 1895.

Furthermore, within the enclosure is located the Portillo del Castillo, which preserves remains of Mudéjar decoration and is located halfway between the wall that connected the castle with the Arch of Las Cuevas, just in front of the tower of the Church of San Martín, open and bridging the gap between 'La Huerta del Duque' and 'La Esplanada del Castillo' by means of stairs after the 2011 restoration. It is a gate for riders that communicated with the glacis. (Note: Initially called campaña, the glacis is a cleared esplanade next to a fortification. In the 17th century its name was replaced by the current one (Mondéjar Manzanares (2007, p. 233))

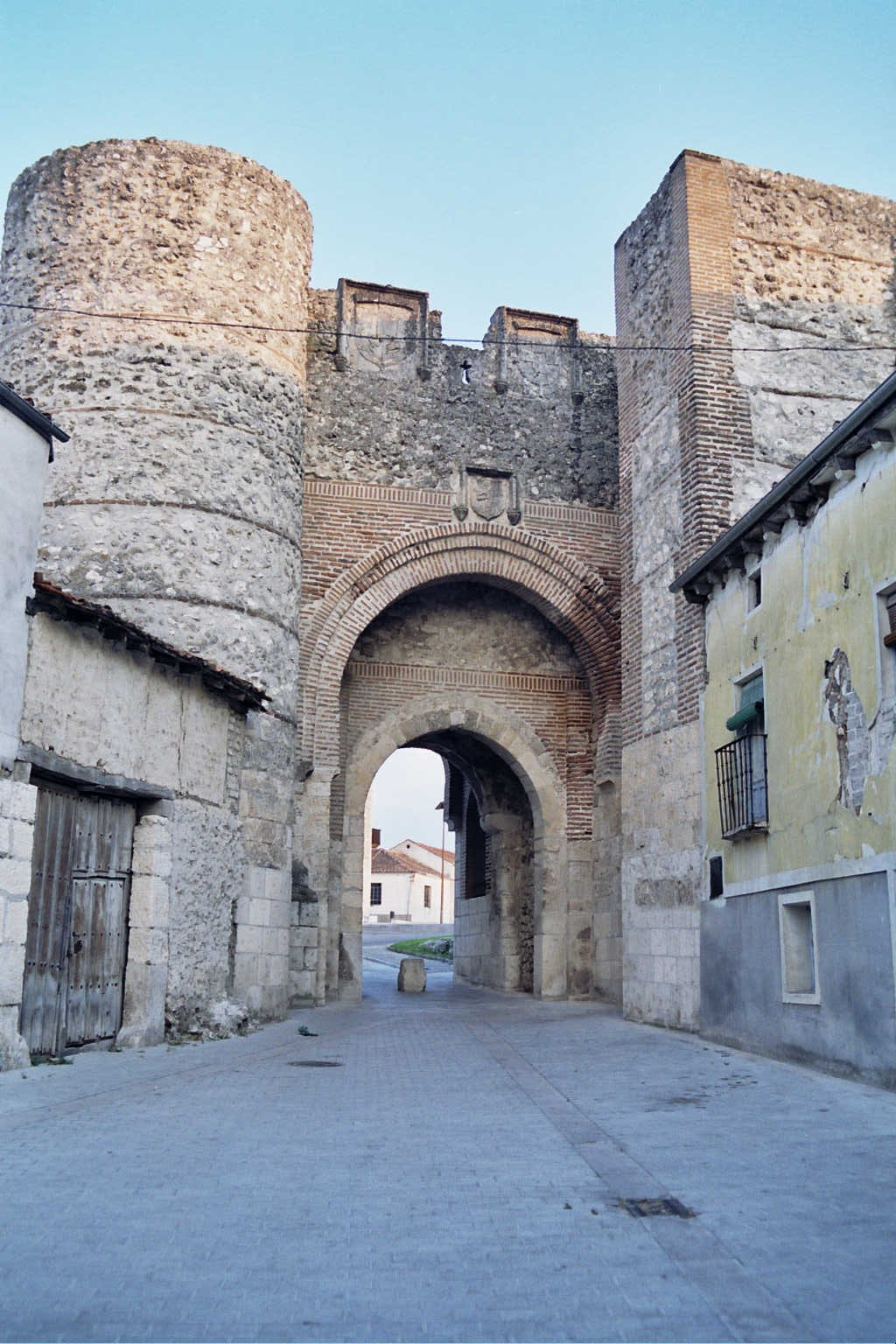
Arch of San Basilio

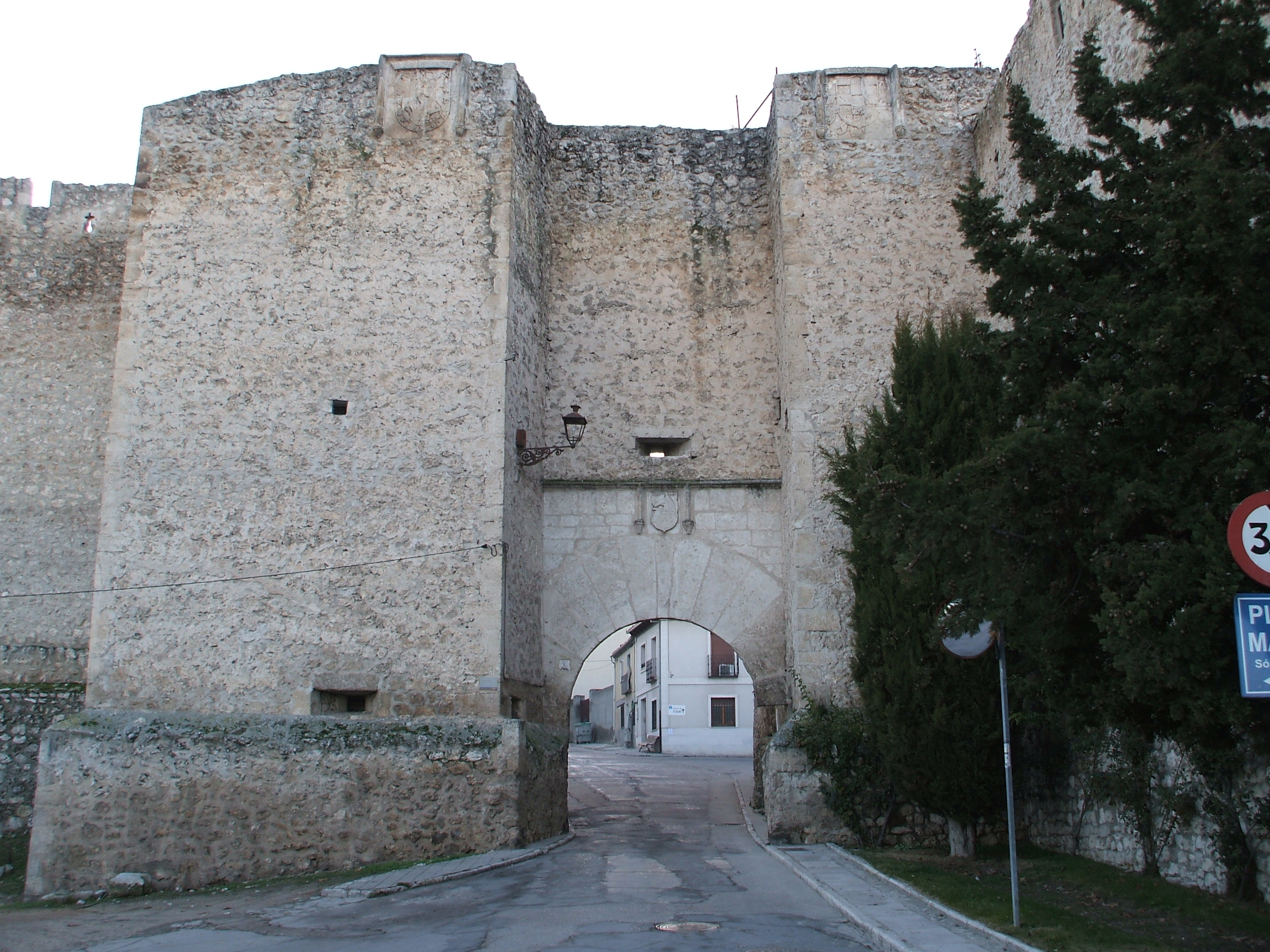
Arch of San Martín

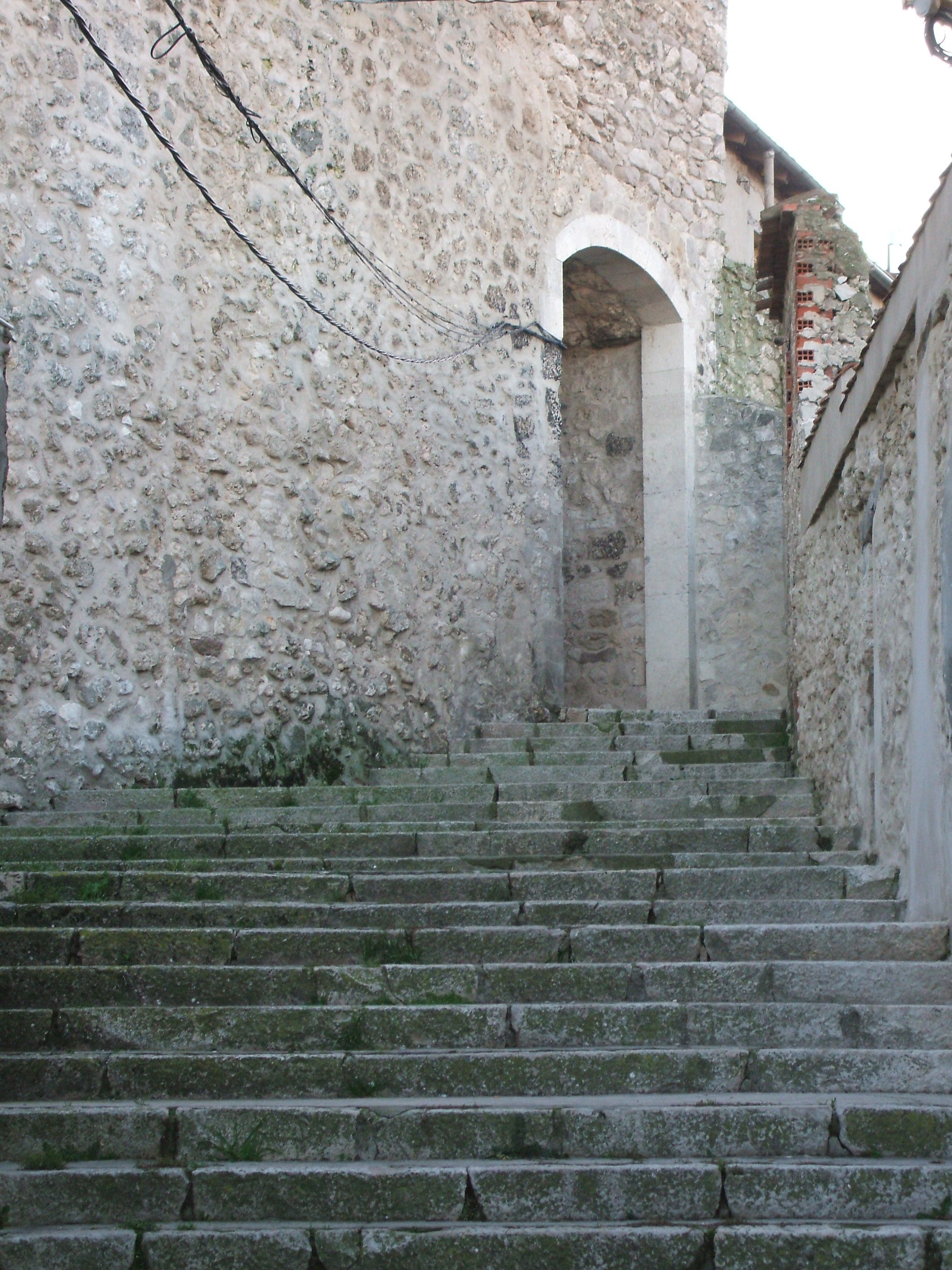
Puerta de la Judería

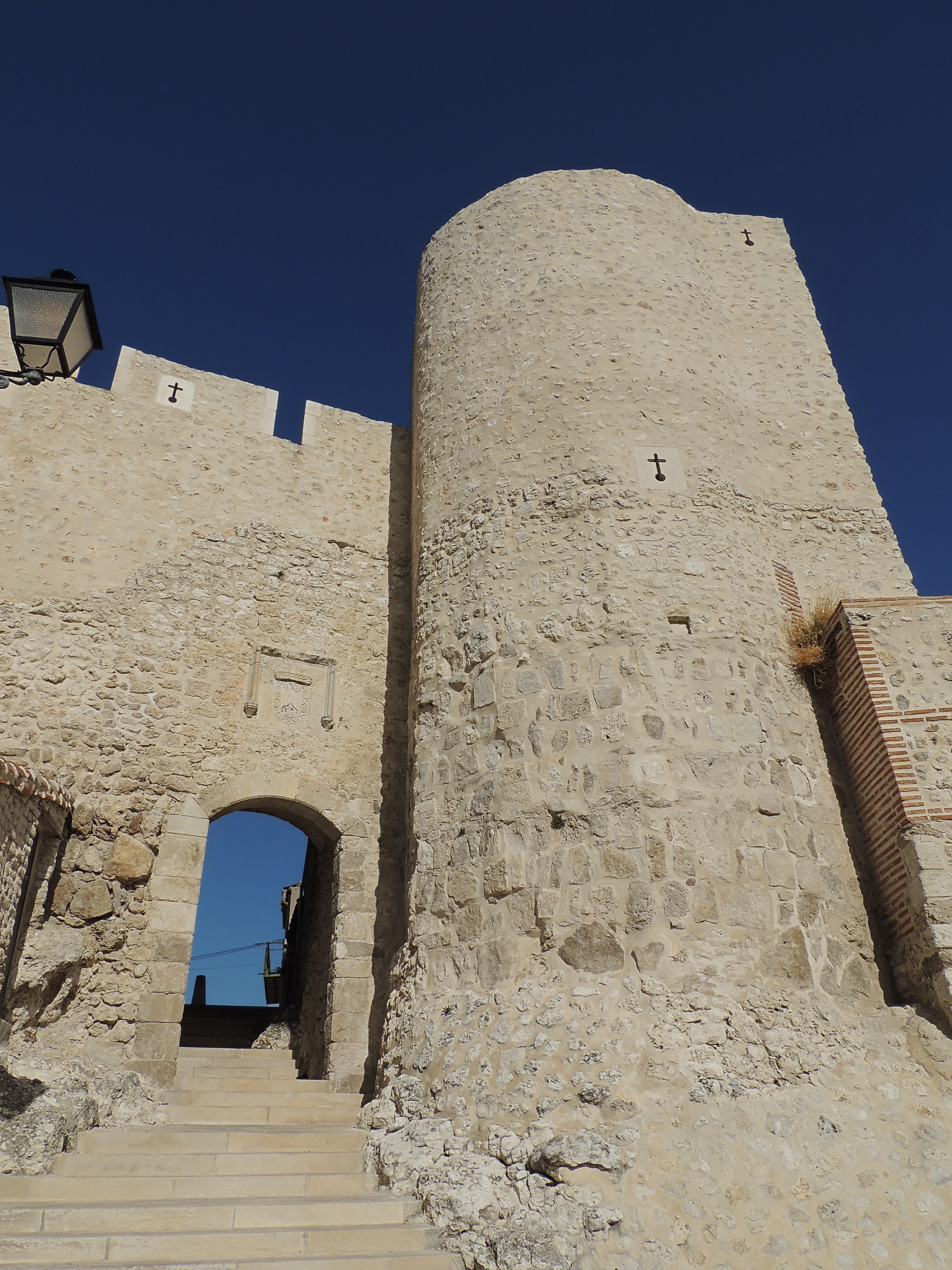
Arch of Santiago

==== Castle ====
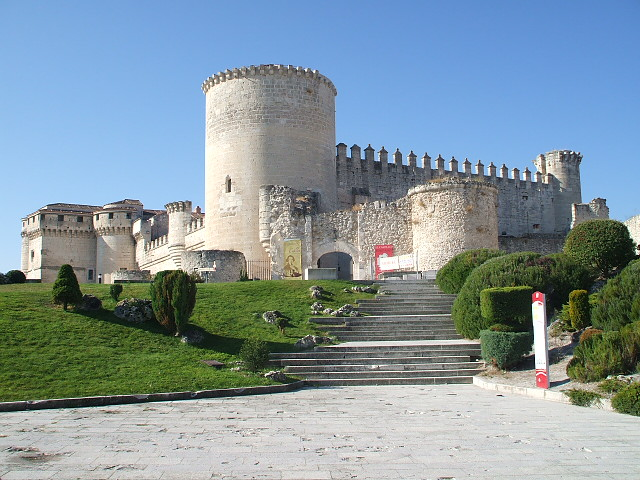
The castle crowned the wall.

The castle is built on the southeast corner of the wall, being its Mudéjar gate an old one of the walls, very similar to the Puerta de San Basilio, although larger. This gate, nowadays called tower-gate, has two lateral turrets slightly turned to not allow a direct front of frontal shot and to produce the rebound of the projectiles; it has a vestibule, in which are located the remains of a double armored door, portcullis and embrasure. Inside the castle there are also remains of a Mudéjar cistern, which would have belonged to the walled complex to supply the guard posts, as well as a gallery of the same style that was the access stairway to one of the towers of the wall, which, when the castle was attached to it, was blinded inside the fortress.

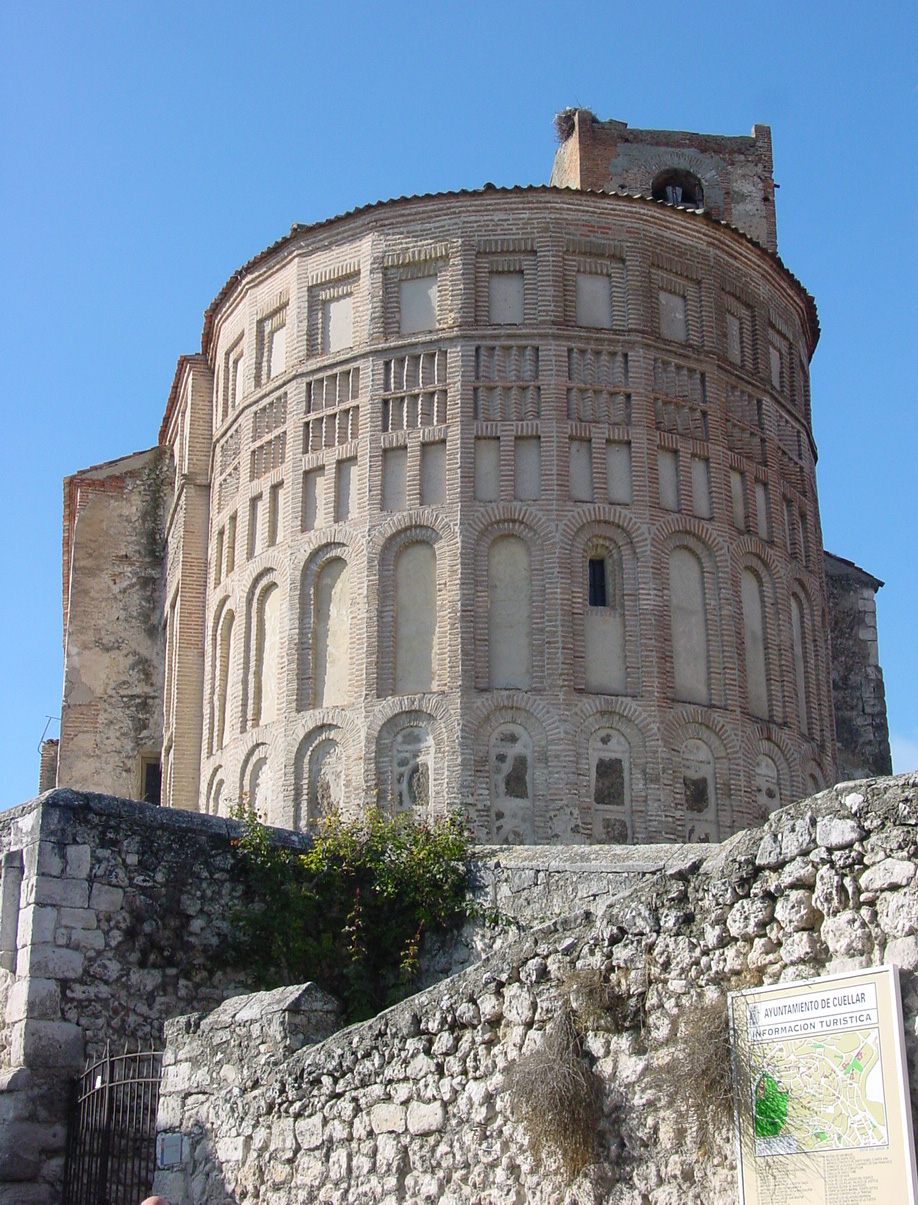
Church of San Esteban

==== Church of San Esteban ====
Located outside the walls of the citadel, as this closed in front of the temple making an abrupt break, its high tower of lime and stone was primarily intended to protect the wall from possible attacks. Surrounding the temple is a system of thick walls that encloses the surroundings, revealing a fortified aspect. What at first sight would have seemed to be the cemetery of the temple, keeps in its base big ashlars, which probably are the only Roman remains that Cuéllar possesses. It is possible that it is an earlier fortification, reused as a defense of the church and as a cemetery.

==== Church of Santiago ====
The Church of Santiago, whose Mudéjar apse and remains of its walls are still preserved today, enjoyed great recognition among the temples of the town, as it was the place where the nobility of Cuellar met and where the House of Lineages had its headquarters. It stood at the top of the citadel wall, also outside the walls of the citadel, and its tower provided greater defense in a vulnerable area. It was attached to the wall, strengthening the adjoining tower of the arch of the same name.

=== City wall ===
Few remains of the outer wall that surrounded the enclosure of the city are preserved. It started from the wall of the citadel, near the Arch of Las Cuevas, where part of the very low starting wall is still preserved. It followed its trajectory towards the convent of La Trinidad, on which the base of a strong tower still stands, continued along the wall, which makes a turn to the south to meet the disappeared Arch of La Trinidad after passing through the Portillo de Santa Marina.

From the Arch of La Trinidad, the wall is barely visible today, as it remains hidden behind the modern buildings, but its route crossed in a straight line until it reached the Church of San Pedro, to which it was attached at the rear to convert the church into a fortress to defend the now disappeared Puerta de San Pedro, located in the most vulnerable part of the town.

The wall continues along the street that bears its name, up to the disappeared Puerta de Carchena, which also formed a large fortified complex. From there the wall crosses the Palace of Santa Cruz, reappearing on its rear façade as the base of a wooden gallery of the palace, continuing north to the Hospital de la Magdalena and ending at the Arch of San Andrés. Once past the arch, the wall headed back to its junction with the wall of the citadel, next to the Puerta de la Judería, guarding in this enclosure the main square and the core of the old city.

==== Access gates ====
The enclosure of the city had four main gates, of which only one is preserved, the one called San Andrés. As can be seen by their layout, the location of the gates coincides with a certain precision with the course of the main roads that cross Cuéllar. Thus, the Arch of San Andrés is close to the road that leads to Valladolid, Olmedo and Medina del Campo; the Puerta de Carchena stands in the direction of Peñafiel, the Arch of San Pedro coincided with the exit for those who took the direction of Segovia and Cantalejo, and the Arch of La Trinidad led to the road to Arévalo.

- Arch of San Andrés. Located on the north side, it is one of the most slender of the complex; it preserves Mudéjar remains and has large voussoirs that frame the council's coat of arms. You can still see the hinges that supported the gates with which it was closed.
- Arch of Carchena. Located in the street of the same name, on the northwest side of the wall, it connected the Franciscan convent area (three monasteries) with the civil administrative center, the main square. It was later known as the "Arch of San Francisco", due to its proximity to this monastery. It is mentioned as being "from Carchena" in 1416, the year in which the Infante John II took possession of the town, through an alderman and at the foot of the arch. (Note: On 31 July Rodrigo Álvarez took possession of it, and as a symbol of possession he was given the keys to this gate.) It was ordered to be demolished for being in ruins in 1873, and although there is no graphic knowledge of its shape and size, a part of what may have been the defensive tower on the north side of the gate is preserved, as well as an important section of the wall and the liza, which corresponds to the current Calle de La Muralla.
- Arch of San Pedro. Located to the southeast of the wall, and next to the church of the same name, it served as the main gate of the town, being the chosen stage for some public manifestations charged with a strong symbolism, such as the changes of ownership of the manor of the Community. (Note: In front of it numerous lords of the town paid homage, opening and closing the gates as a symbolic form of taking possession. This was done in 1445 when the Constable Álvaro de Luna became lord of Cuéllar for the second time.) It was demolished in 1895 and there were rooms and inhabited houses on it.
- Arch of La Trinidad. It was located in the southern corner, and allowed access to the suburb around the Church of El Salvador and at the foot of Santa María de la Cuesta. Its shape and characteristics are unknown, since it was ordered to be demolished between 1879 and 1880 due to its state of ruin. It owes its name to the nearby Convent of La Trinidad, and the start of the arch can still be seen on the façade of one of the modern buildings.

Within this enclosure is located one more gate, the well-known Portillo de Santa Marina, of Mudéjar style, which communicated the space occupied by the old butcher's shops with the orchards adjacent to the Convent of La Trinidad. Its surroundings are known by the name of Dexángel, derived from drainage, since the drains of the butcher's shops and other dirty waters passed under the wall of this area on the way to the Huerta Herrera. It is definitely an access for surveillance.

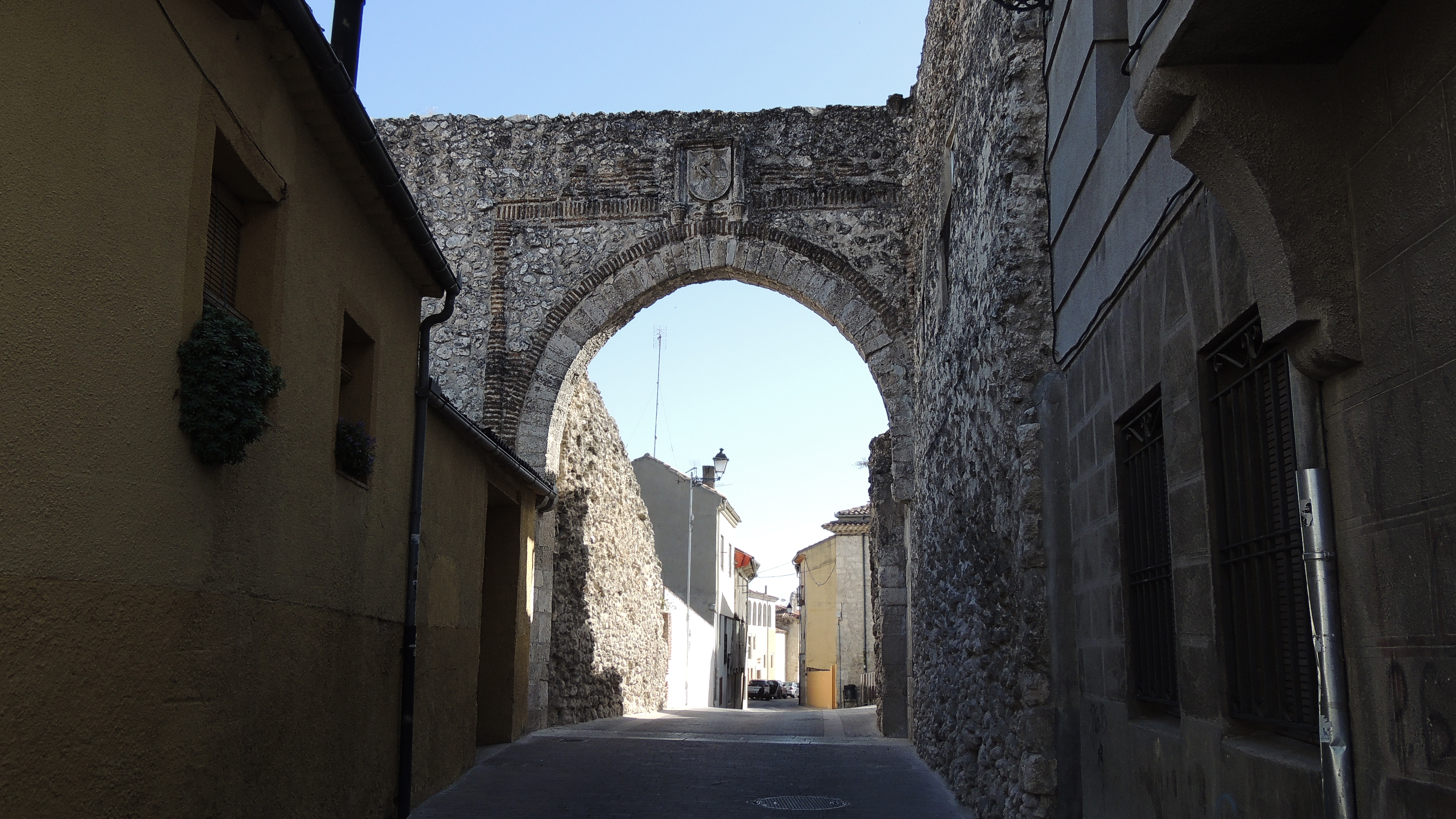
Arch of San Andrés

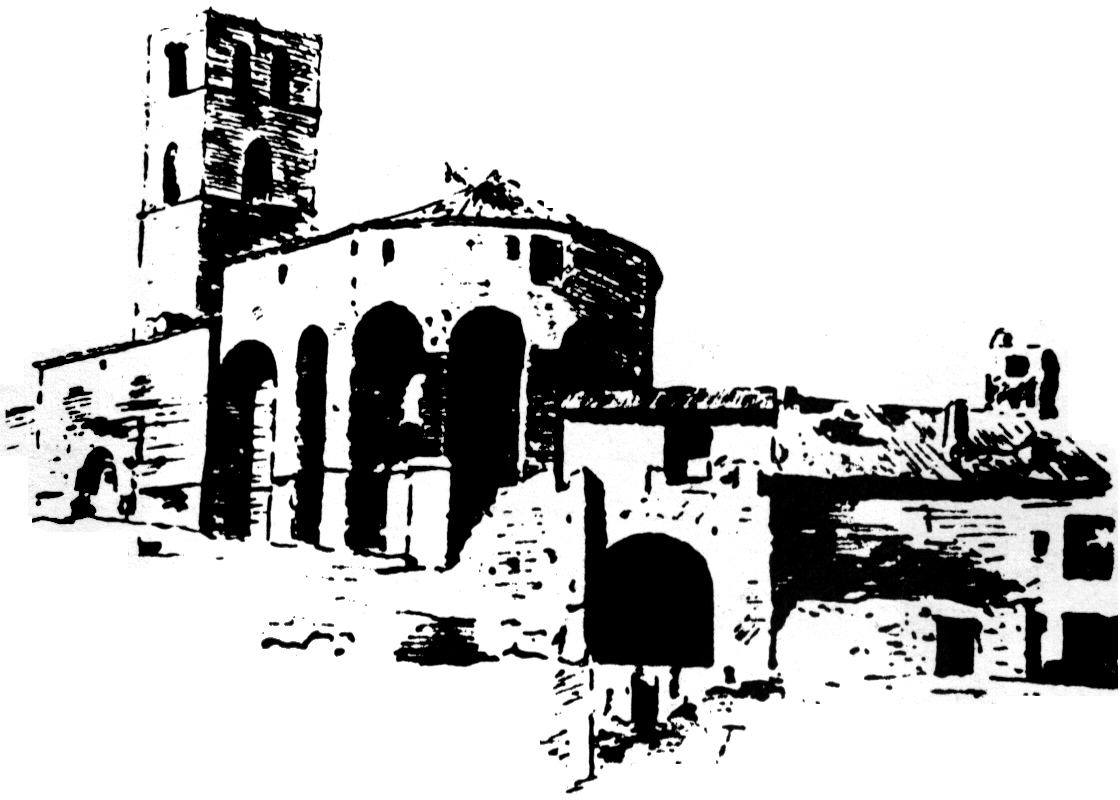
Arch of San Pedro

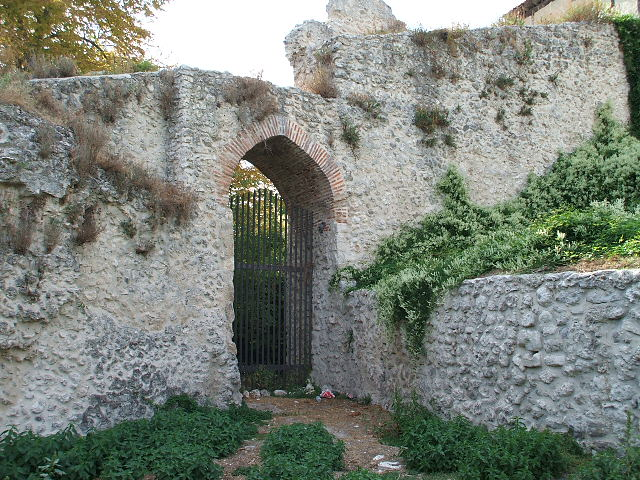
Portillo de Santa Marina

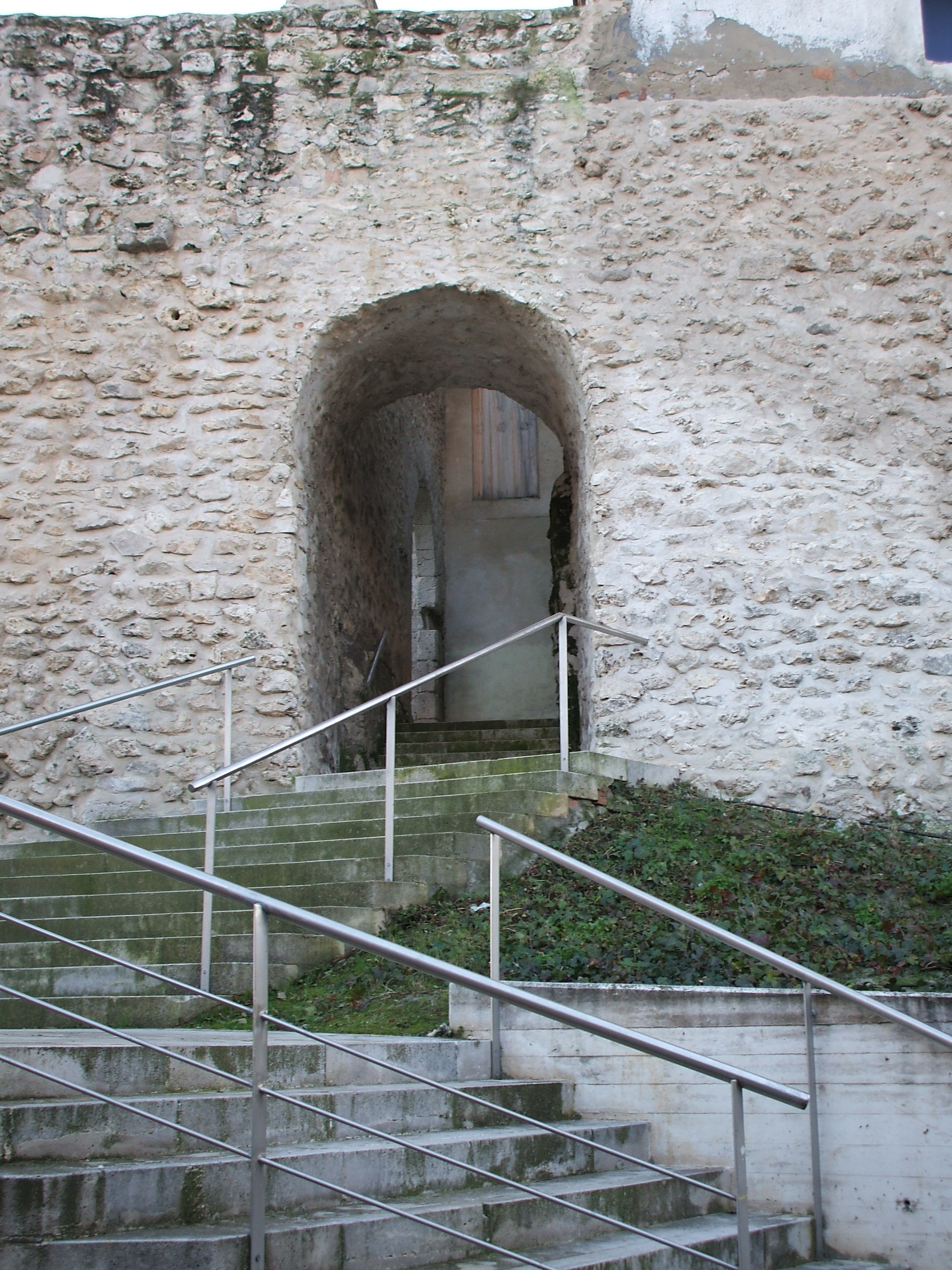
Puerta de La Magdalena

==== Church of San Pedro ====
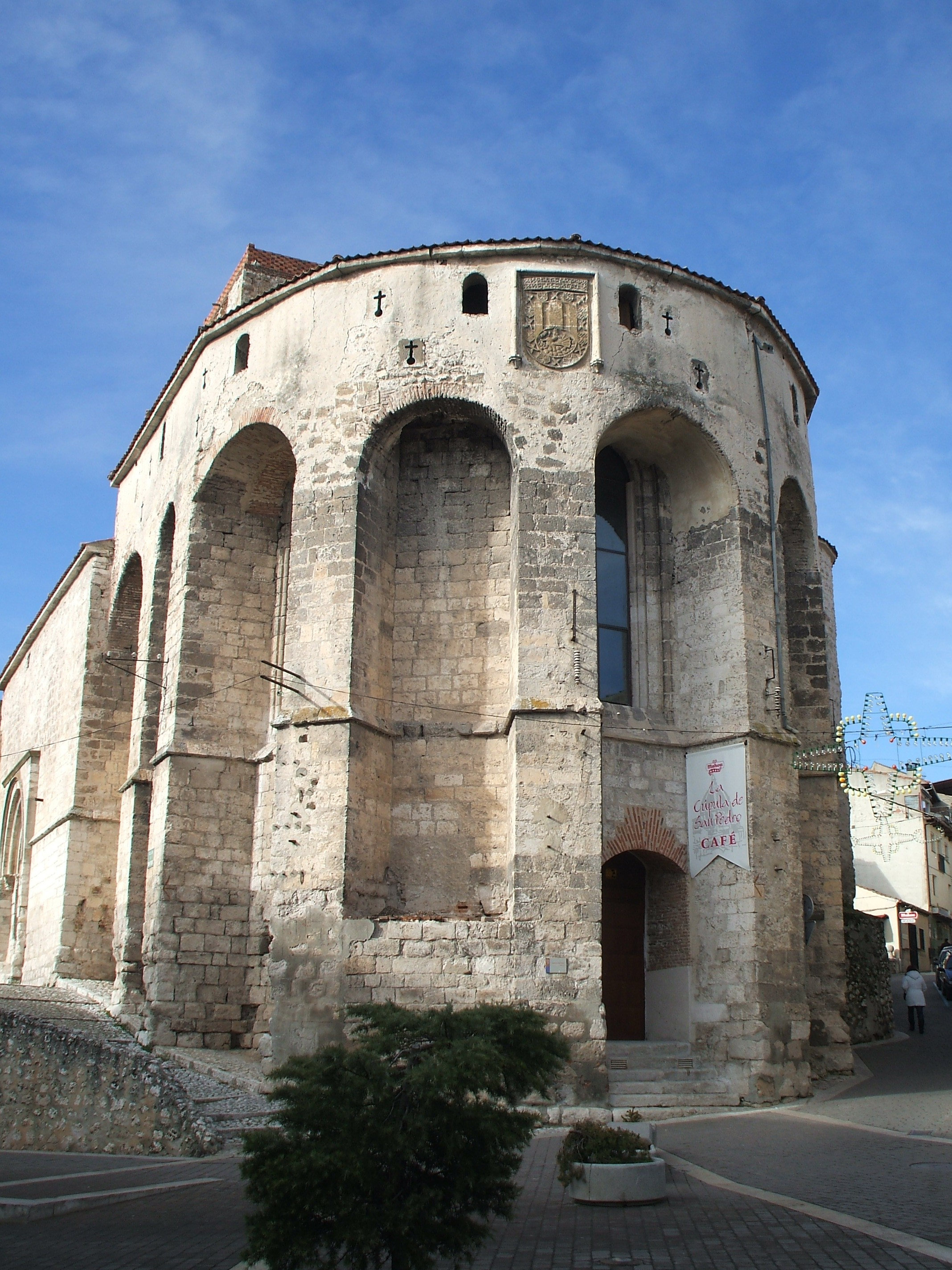
Fortified Church of San Pedro

Located in the southern part of the wall, it topped the most vulnerable point of it, so its construction is a mixture of both characters, religious and military, which gives it the appearance of a fortress. It finished off the wall by means of a stone apse of stone masonry, reinforced with openings of arrowslits in cross, and machicolations, directed by means of a hanging parapet covered on its buttresses, that crosses the apse incorporating it to the layout of the parapet of the wall, which was built by Francisco Fernandez de la Cueva, 2nd duke of Alburquerque in the 16th century. Above the parapet is his coat of arms with two superimposed fireplaces with cross and orb arrow slits and loopholes with a segmental vault.

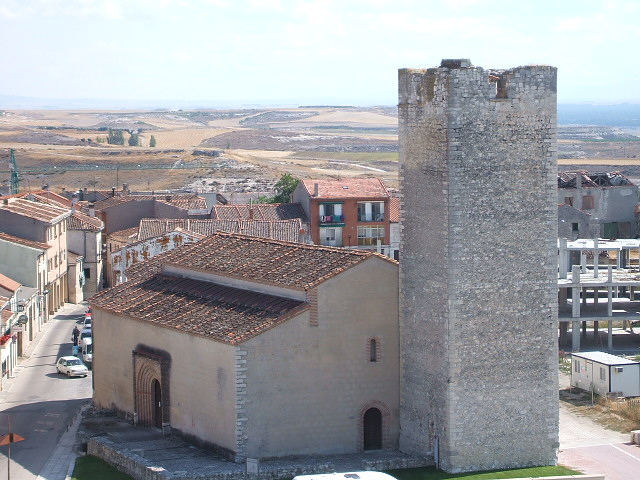
Tower of San Martín, very similar to other towers of the wall

Next to the arch of its name, attached to the apse, the church became a small fortress that provided greater security to the southern part of the wall, across which a wide plain stretched, thus turning the area into a point of risk.

=== Counter wall ===
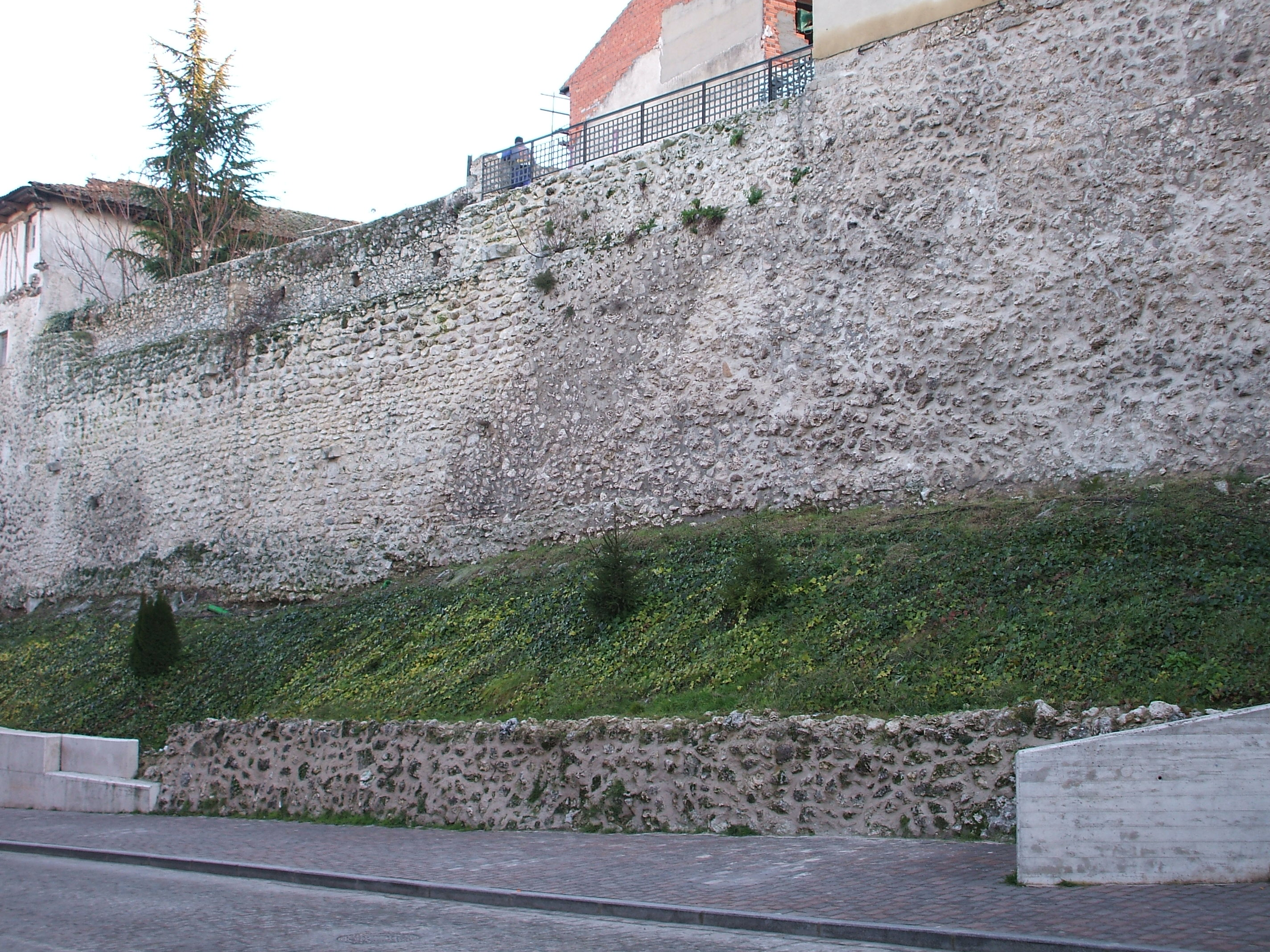
Section of counter wall that is conserved in Nueva Street (lower wall at ground level)

The counter wall, barrier or antemurial was a third enclosure that embraced the two previous ones, and that at the present time is quite deteriorated. It is a bastion of smaller structures but of great importance, and is presented as a barbican in front of the walls of part of the citadel wall and the entire city wall.

Remains are located in front of the walls of the citadel as they pass through the Huerta del Duque, and appear clearly in front of those of the city next to the Convent of La Trinidad, in the vicinity of which are preserved remains of this counter wall very well crenellated, and that continued to the Arch of La Trinidad, unfolding in some sections. It reappears perfectly visible in the vicinity of the Church of San Pedro, behind the modern buildings of the Huerta Herrera, with some crenellated sections. Past the Arch of San Pedro, it continues parallel to Las Parras Street, where its houses are leaning on the counter wall, except for the last ones, for whose construction the counter wall was demolished a decade ago. Remains appear again in Nueva Street, which continue up to the Arch of San Andrés. From there, it continued along La Barrera street (the name it takes from the counter wall), following parallel to the wall up to the Arch of San Basilio. On the other side of it and towards the castle, it reappears up to the great Santo Domingo cube, belonging to the fortress.

=== Disappeared enclosure ===
Recent studies have shown that there was a fourth enclosure, now disappeared, which, starting from the castle, connected with the Arch of San Basilio through a structure of towers, and that a wall emerged from this arch that reached a tower of great complexity, which apparently would later be used as the tower of the Church of San Martín; through a gate the wall continued until it finally joined the citadel This fourth enclosure would further strengthen the castle, turning it into an important and inaccessible bastion.

== Functionality ==
Its role was not limited to the defensive field, but also to the commercial and therefore the economic fields, and above all performed an aesthetic function, because through them the city showed its power. The medieval wall also served as a distinctive element of the urban interior in relation to its surroundings, and the line of the walls marked a jurisdictional boundary, as well as the residence within them differentiated the Villager Knights from the peasants and foreigners.

Over time, its military function ceased to be important, and a commercial value began to prevail, since its presence and isolation factor turned it into a customs office through which access to the city was channeled and regulated, stipulated with the payment of the tariff. This vigilance also facilitated the collection of important taxes and tributes that were applied to the transit of people and merchandise, among which stood out the "portazgo", the "alcabala" or the "cornado de la cerca", a special tribute existing in Castile for this type of construction.

The separation imposed by the wall also served as a sanitary barrier that isolated the towns from the plagues and epidemics that were so frequent in the Middle Ages. Also influencing the healthiness of the interior of the enclosure were certain ordinances that prohibited throwing waste and garbage inside the wall, forcing the population to deposit it outside.

The perception that the people of the time had of cities was linked to their walls, and thus the urban world, delimited within its fortified bastion, offered a dominant aspect that stood out in the surrounding space, and this was the image that Cuéllar offered to the visitor, an image that corresponded to the head of an extensive Comunidad de Villa y Tierra (Community of Towns and Lands), to a city that had to exercise its jurisdictional domination over its surroundings.

== Surveillance and maintenance ==
The money for the construction or repair of walls used to come from the shares called "repartimientos", which were taxes prorated among all the inhabitants of a Comunidad de Villa y Tierra, not only the common people, but also Jews, Muslims, clergymen and nobles.

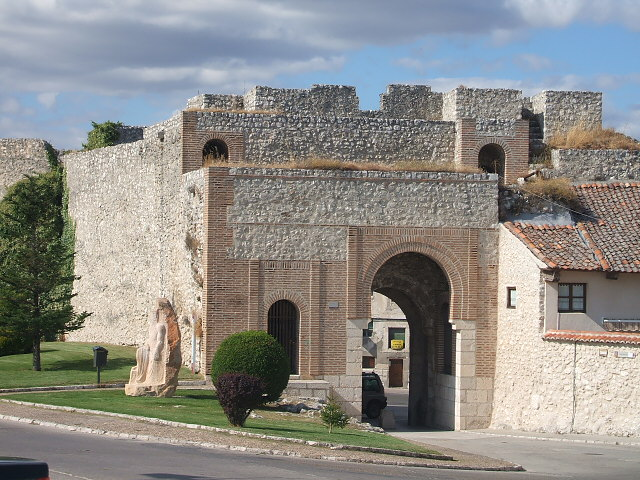
Interior of the Arch of San Basilio, where the structure destined to the keepers can be observed in the upper part

The gates that gave access to the walls of the citadel and the city, were closed with large gates equipped with locks, so that once closed, no one could enter or leave. At the end of the 16th century, several items were paid to put new locks on the gates of La Trinidad, Carchena and San Basilio. In 1551, Mr. Gil González was ordered to guard La Trinidad gate on the day of Santiago de Compostela and Mr. Diego Daza on the day of Santa Ana. Likewise, on 1 September 1564, it was determined that the gatekeepers who had guarded the gates of the town would be paid what they were owed.

From the surnames of the people appointed to guard the doors, it can be deduced that it was the nobility who were to be in charge of the watch. The internal structure of the House of the Lineages seems to corroborate this fact. This noble institution was divided into two parties, the Upper and the Lower, alluding to the division of the town into two-halves: on the one hand the citadel and on the other the city. Within the two parties there were subdivisions in adras and quarters. (Note: The House was composed of eight lineages, four in each party, and they were organized in four adras which in turn were divided into four quarters each. Thus, the adras of the upper party were the Adra de San Martín, which was divided into the quarters of San García, Velasco Andul, García Gómez and Sancho Vela; and the Adra de San Esteban, divided into the quarters of Pedro Muñoz, Santa María, Ortún Velasco and Alonso Muñoz. The Adra de San Pedro, organized into the quarters of San Pedro, San Miguel, Santa Marina and Santo Tomé, and the Adra de Santa Marina, divided into the quarters of San Juan, Don Nieto, El Salvador and Santiago, belonged to the lower part. (Ceballos-Escalera y Gila (1989, pp. 10–11)) The adras were a division of the neighborhood of a city, while the quarters, in addition to representing a territorial division, had a military meaning that alluded to the guard shift between four: one sentry, one guard and two on rest. This military division must have been established at its foundation, which occurred in the 14th century, and was in force until the beginning of the 17th century, when it disappeared and the knights were only settled in lineages and parties, leaving aside the adras and quarters. (Note: The military organization of the House disappears, as it continues to function until approximately 1840, when it is finally extinguished due to the derogation of the distinction of States in 1836, and the spread of the new liberal and egalitarian currents that considered this type of institutions as samples of the darkest feudalism. (Ceballos-Escalera y Gila (1989, p. 12)) The moment of its disappearance also seems to coincide with the time when the walls ceased to function as a defensive system and began to become a barrier of isolation and administrative surveillance.

== Bibliography ==
- Ceballos-Escalera y Gila, Alfonso (1989). La Casa de los Ocho Linajes de la Villa y Tierra de Cuéllar (in Spanish). Madrid: Editorial Ana Moyano y Vital. ISBN 84-404-4987-9.
- Mondéjar Manzanares, Rosario Mª (2007). El Castillo de Cuéllar: Apuntes para la interpretación de un castillo (in Spanish). Segovia. ISBN 978-8-4612-1200-2.
- Olmos Herguedas, Emilio (1998). La Comunidad de Villa y Tierra de Cuéllar a fines de la Edad Media. Poder político concejil, ordenanzas municipales y regulación de la actividad económica (in Spanish). Valladolid. ISBN 84-7762-855-6.
- Rodrigo Criado, Isaías (1994). Cuéllar. Crónicas municipales de la Ilustre villa en este siglo: 1900-1994 (in Spanish). Madrid. ISBN 84-605-5413-9.
- "La Gaceta de Cuéllar". (Cuéllar Gazette) (in Spanish) (21). 1996–2003. ISSN 1136-632X.
- "Revista LA VILLA". (LA VILLA Magazine) (in Spanish) (1, 2, 8, 18, 19, 30, 34). 1998–2008.
- "Revista DECIR". (DECIR Magazine) (in Spanish) (19, 26, 27). 1979–1992.
- Velasco Bayón, Balbino (1996). Historia de Cuéllar (in Spanish) (4th ed.). Segovia. ISBN 84-500-4620-3.
