= Beltrán de la Cueva, 3rd Duke of Alburquerque =

Spanish nobleman

Beltrán de la Cueva y Toledo, 3rd Duke of Alburquerque, (in full, Spanish: Don Beltrán de la Cueva y Álvarez de Toledo, tercer duque de Alburquerque, tercer conde de Ledesma, tercer conde de Huelma, señor de los estados de Cuéllar, la Codesera, Mombeltrán y Pedro Bernardo), (c. 1478 – 11 February 1560) was a Spanish nobleman and military leader.

== Biography ==
He was born in Cuéllar, the son of Don Francisco Fernández de la Cueva, 2nd Duke of Alburquerque and of Francisca de Toledo, daughter of García Álvarez de Toledo, 1st Duke of Alba.

Beltrán de la Cueva was appointed captain general of the Spanish Army, and commander-in-chief of the English Army in France (under queen Mary I of England). He was named a Knight of the Order of the Golden Fleece in 1531, a Viceroy of Aragon in 1535, and a Viceroy of Navarre in 1552, position he held until his death in 1560.

=== Marriage and children ===
He married Isabel Girón y de la Vega, daughter of Juan Téllez-Girón, II Count of Ureña, and had :

- Francisco Fernández de la Cueva, 4th Duke of Alburquerque.
- Juan de la Cueva y Girón.
- Francisca de la Cueva y Girón, married Claudio Fernández Vigil de Quiñones, IV Count of Luna, no issue.
- Gabriel de la Cueva, 5th Duke of Alburquerque.
- Leonor de la Cueva y Girón, married Pedro Fernando Ruiz de Castro Andrade y Portugal, parents of Fernando Ruiz de Castro Andrade y Portugal, VI Count of Lemos.

== Sources ==
- Castro Pereira Mouzinho de Albuquerque e Cunha, Fernando de (1995). Instrumentário Genealógico - Linhagens Milenárias (in Portuguese). pp. 329–30.
- Hobbs, Nicolas (2007). "Grandes de España" (in Spanish).
- Instituto de Salazar y Castro. Elenco de Grandezas y Titulos Nobiliarios Españoles (in Spanish). periodic publication.

Government offices
Preceded by Juan de Lanuza y Torrellas	Viceroy of Aragon; 1535–1539	Succeeded by The Count of Morata de Jalón
Preceded by The Duke of Maqueda	Viceroy of Navarre; 1552–1560	Succeeded by The Duke of Alburquerque
Spanish nobility
Preceded by Francisco I Fernández de la Cueva	Duke of Alburquerque; 1526–1560	Succeeded by Francisco II; Fernández de la Cueva
