= Duke of Alburquerque =

Spanish noble title of royal origin, created in 1464 by Henry IV of Castile

Dukedom of Alburquerque
- Creation date: 20 August 1464
- Created by: Henry IV
- Peerage: Peerage of Spain
- First holder: Beltrán de la Cueva y Alfonso de Mercado, 1st Duke of Alburquerque
- Present holder: Juan Miguel Osorio y Bertrán de Lis, 19th Duke of Alburquerque

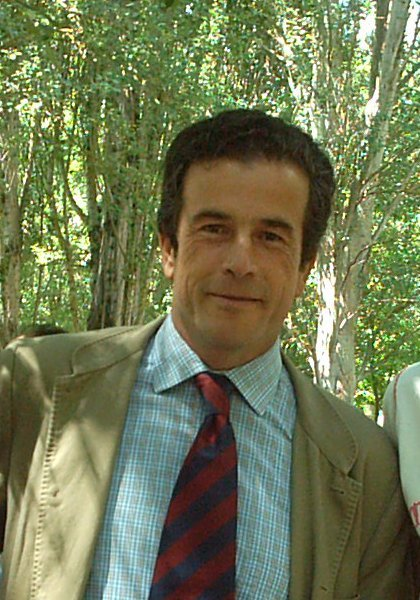
Juan Miguel Osorio y Bertrán de Lis, 19th Duke of Alburquerque

Duke of Alburquerque (Spanish: Duque de Alburquerque) is a hereditary title in the Peerage of Spain, accompanied by the dignity of Grandee and granted in 1464 by Henry IV to Beltrán de la Cueva, his "royal favourite" and grand master of the Order of Santiago. It makes reference to the town of Alburquerque in Badajoz, Spain.

== Dukes of Alburquerque ==
1. Beltrán de la Cueva, 1st Duke of Alburquerque (1464–1492)
2. Francisco Fernández de la Cueva, 2nd Duke of Alburquerque (1492–1526)
3. Beltrán de la Cueva, 3rd Duke of Alburquerque (1526–1560)
4. Francisco Fernández de la Cueva, 4th Duke of Alburquerque (1560–1563)
5. Gabriel de la Cueva, 5th Duke of Alburquerque (1563–1571)
6. Beltrán III de la Cueva y Castilla, 6th Duke of Alburquerque (1571–1612), Viceroy of Aragón
7. Francisco Fernández de la Cueva, 7th Duke of Alburquerque (1612–1637)
8. Francisco Fernández de la Cueva, 8th Duke of Alburquerque (1637–1676), Viceroy of New Spain
9. Melchor Fernández de la Cueva y Enríquez de Cabrera, 9th Duke of Alburquerque (1676–1686)
10. Francisco Fernández de la Cueva, 10th Duke of Alburquerque (1686–1733), Viceroy of New Spain
11. Francisco VI Fernández de la Cueva y de la Cerda, 11th Duke of Alburquerque (1733–1757)
12. Pedro Miguel de la Cueva y Guzmán, 12th Duke of Alburquerque (1757–1762)
13. Miguel de la Cueva y Enríquez de Navarra, 13th Duke of Alburquerque (1762–1803), Viceroy of Aragón
14. José María de la Cueva, 14th Duke of Alburquerque (1803–1811)
15. Nicolás Osorio y Zayas, 15th Duke of Alburquerque (1830–1866)
16. José Osorio y Silva, 16th Duke of Alburquerque (1866–1909)
17. Miguel Osorio y Martos, 17th Duke of Alburquerque (1910–1942)
18. Beltrán Alfonso Osorio, 18th Duke of Alburquerque (1942–1994)
19. Juan Miguel Osorio y Bertrán de Lis, 19th Duke of Alburquerque (born 1958), the current holder of the ducal title.

== See also ==
- List of dukes in the peerage of Spain
- List of current grandees of Spain
