= Francisco Fernández de la Cueva, 4th Duke of Alburquerque =

Spanish nobleman

Francisco Fernández de la Cueva y Girón, 4th Duke of Alburquerque (in full, Spanish: Don Francisco Fernández de la Cueva y Téllez-Girón, cuarto duque de Alburquerque, cuarto conde de Ledesma, cuarto conde de Huelma, primer marqués de Cuéllar, señor de los estados de Mombeltrán y Pedro Bernardo) (c. 1510 – 1563) was a Spanish nobleman.

He was the son of Don Beltrán de la Cueva, 3rd Duke of Alburquerque and of Doña Isabel Girón. He fought in Africa and participated in the siege at La Goletta and the Conquest of Tunis in 1535.

He married Doña Constanza de Leiva, daughter of the principe di Ascoli, and later (1549) Doña María Fernández de la Córdoba, daughter of Luis Fernández de Córdoba, 2nd Marquis of Comares.

== Sources ==
- "Castillo de Cuéllar" (in Spanish). 2007. Archived from the original on 25 February 2009.
- Hobbs, Nicolas (2007). "Grandes de España" (in Spanish).
- Instituto de Salazar y Castro. Elenco de Grandezas y Titulos Nobiliarios Españoles (in Spanish). periodic publication.

Spanish nobility
Preceded by Beltrán de la Cueva	Duke of Alburquerque; 1560–1563	Succeeded by Gabriel de la Cueva
New title	Marquis of Cuellar; 1530–1563	Succeeded by Gabriel de la Cueva
