= Gabriel de la Cueva, 5th Duke of Alburquerque =

Spanish nobleman

The Most Excellent The Duke of Alburquerque GE
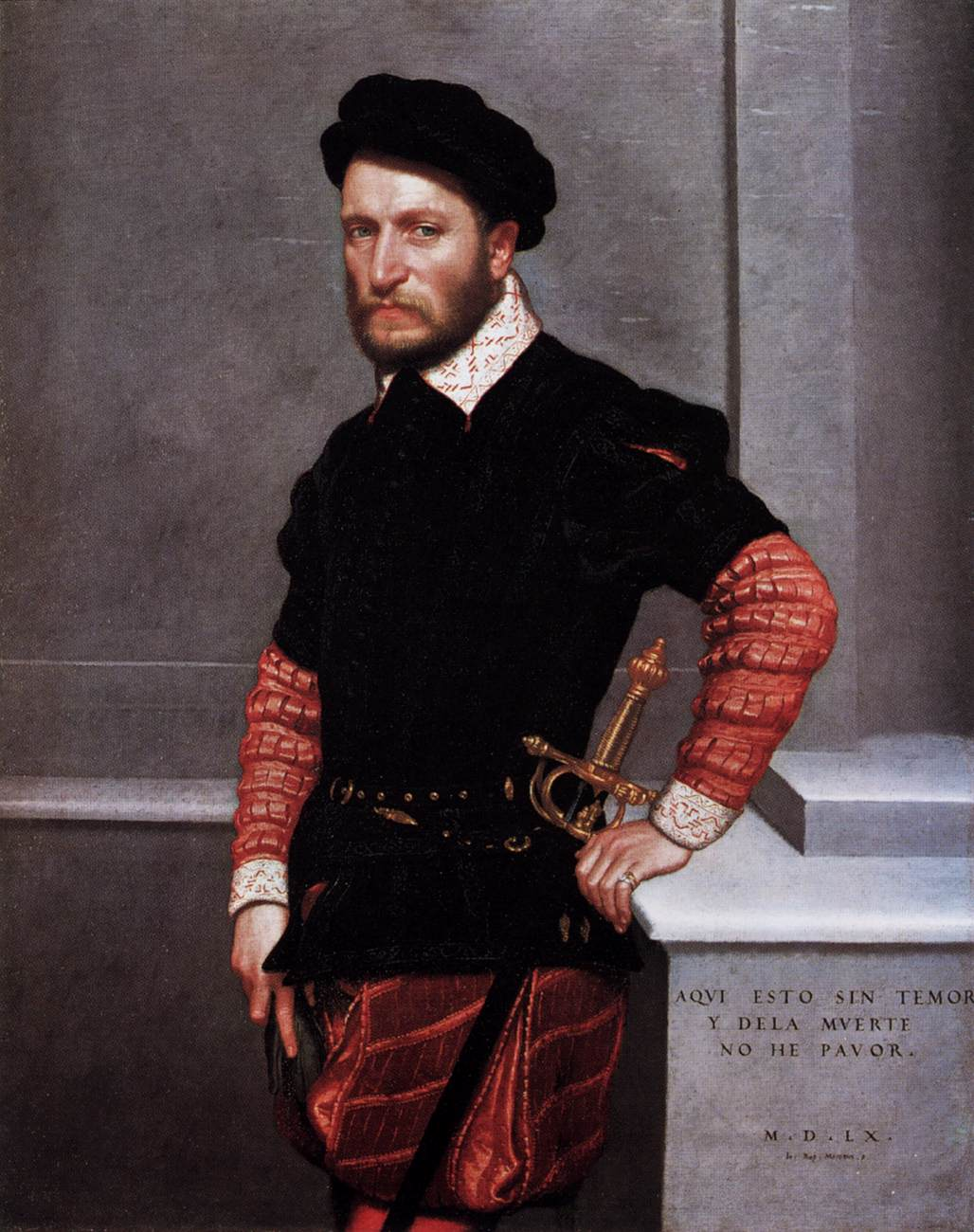
- Portrait by Moroni, 1560

Viceroy of Navarre
- In office January 4, 1560 – 5 September 1564
- Monarch: Philip II
- Preceded by: Beltrán de la Cueva y Toledo
- Succeeded by: Alfonso de Córdoba y Velasco

Governor of Milan
- In office April 1564 – August 1571
- Monarch: Philip II

Personal details
- Born: Gabriel de la Cueva y Girón c. 1515 Cuéllar, Spain
- Died: 1571 Milan, Duchy of Milan
- Spouse: Juana de la Lama y de la Cueva
- Children: María de la Cueva y de la Lama; Ana de la Cueva y de la Lama
- Parents: Beltrán de la Cueva y Toledo; Isabel Girón y de la Vega

Gabriel de la Cueva y Girón, 5th Duke of Alburquerque, 2nd Marquess of Cuéllar, 5th Count of Ledesma, 5th Count of Huelma (c. 1515 – 1571) was a Spanish nobleman and military leader who served as Viceroy of Navarre from 1560 to 1564 and Governor of Milan from 1564 to his death in 1571.

== Biography ==
He was born in Cuéllar, the son of Don Beltrán de la Cueva, 3rd Duke of Alburquerque and of Doña Isabel Girón, and inherited the title from his older brother, Francisco Fernández de la Cueva, 4th Duke of Alburquerque. After leading in 1556 the defense of Oran against the Turks, Gabriel de la Cueva was appointed Viceroy of Navarre in 1560, to replace his father who had died, and later Governor of the Duchy of Milan in 1564, a position that he held until his own death in 1571

Correction to the above paragraph: (Ayes, sic, Gabriel de la Cueva y Giron was the son of don Beltrán de la Cueva, III Duke of Alburquerque and of Doña Isabel Téllez Girón and inherited the title from his grandfather, Francisco Fernández de la Cueva y Mendoza II Duke of Alburquerque and his wife, Francisca Álvarez de Toledo.

Source of proof, Ministry of Culture Spain: Section of Nobility of the National Historical Archive:

Archivo: Sección Nobleza del Archivo Histórico Nacional Signatura: OSUNA,C.4,D.1-2 Código de Referencia: ES.45168.SNAHN/1.6.3.9//OSUNA,C.4,D.1-2 Título:

Capitulaciones matrimoniales hechas entre Francisco Hernández (sic) de la Cueva, [II] Duque de Alburquerque, y Juan Téllez-Girón, II Conde de Ureña, padres de Beltrán de la Cueva, [III Duque de Alburquerque] e Isabel Girón, respectivamente, en razón al matrimonio de sus hijos. Además hay cartas de pago, de dote, de arras, etc. Incluye una cédula de la reina Juana al Duque de Alburquerque y al Conde de Ureña autorizando el casamiento.

Translation, ( Ayes, sic: Record of matrimony between Francisco Fernández, de la Cueva, II Duke of Alburquerque and Juan Téllez-Girón, 2nd Count of Ureña, fathers of Beltrán de la Cueva, III Duke of Alburquerque and Isabel Girón, in the marriage of their children. Includes letters of payment, marriage contract, includes the royal decree of the queen, Juana to the Duke of Alburquerque and the Count of Ureña authorizing the marriage.)

Document continues with the date of creation:

Fecha Creación: 1508-03-15 Cuéllar (Segovia) / 1510-04-24 Cuéllar (Segovia) Signatura Histórico: OSUNA, LEG.4,D.1; OSUNA, LEG.4, D.63 OSUNA, C.4, D.1-2 Contiene: Documento 1: Contiene los originales de: - Dos originales de las capitulaciones de casamiento. Cuellar, 1508, marzo, 15 (con sellos de placa). - Carta de pago de Beltrán de la Cueva. Cuéllar, 1508, abril, 4. - Carta de Francisco Hernández de la Cueva y Beltrán de la Cueva. Cuéllar, 1508, junio, 10. - Carta de pago de Beltrán de la Cueva. Cuéllar, 1508, junio, 10. - Carta de poder de Francisco Hernández de la Cueva. Cuéllar, 1508, agosto, 30. - Carta de poder de Juan Téllez-Girón. Peñafiel, 1508, septiembre, 19. - Carta de Beltrán de la Cueva a la reina Juana. Cuéllar, 1508, agosto, 30. - Cédula de la reina Juana dando licencia para el casamiento. Sevilla, 1508, diciembre, 8. (con autógrafo y sello de placa). - Traslado de la cédula de la reina Juana a Juan Téllez-Girón. Cuéllar, 1509, marzo, 26. - Carta de pago de Beltrán de la Cueva. Peñafiel, 1510, abril, 12. - Carta de Beltrán de la Cueva. Peñafiel, 1510, abril, 24. Documento 2: Contiene: - Copias simples de los documentos anteriores y más. Estado de Conservación: Bueno Lengua/Escritura de la Documentación: Español Cortesana y humanística

He married his niece Doña Juana de la Lama, 4th Marchioness of la Adrada, only daughter of Gonzalo Fernández de la Lama and Isabel de la Cueva y Portocarrero.
During his reign in Milan, Doña Juana received from Pope Pius V the Golden Rose, normally only given to Kings and Emperors.
They had two daughters :

- María de la Cueva y de la Lama, died young.
- Ana de la Cueva y de la Lama (*Milán), Marchioness of la Adrada, married Juan de la Cerda y Aragón, 6th Duke of Medinaceli.

Gabriel was succeeded by his cousin Beltrán de la Cueva.

== Sources ==
- Castro Pereira Mouzinho de Albuquerque e Cunha, Fernando de (1995). Instrumentário Genealógico - Linhagens Milenárias (in Portuguese). pp. 329–30.
- Hobbs, Nicolas (2007). "Grandes de España" (in Spanish).
- Instituto de Salazar y Castro. Elenco de Grandezas y Titulos Nobiliarios Españoles (in Spanish). periodic publication.

Sola, J. Emilio - Equipo CEDCS (2020). Glosa para la corte del cerco de Oran por los turcos de 1556 (PDF) (in Spanish). Archivo de la Frontera, Feb 18, 2020.

Government offices
Preceded by The Duke of Alburquerque	Viceroy of Navarre; 1560–1563	Succeeded by The Count of Alcaudete
Preceded by Gonzalo; Fernández de Córdoba	Governor of the Duchy of Milan; 1564–1571	Succeeded by Álvaro de Sande
Spanish nobility
Preceded by Francisco; Fernández de la Cueva	Duke of Alburquerque; 1563–1571	Succeeded by Beltrán de la Cueva
