= Francisco Fernández de la Cueva, 10th Duke of Alburquerque =

Spanish duke, namesake of Albuquerque (city), USA

The Most Excellent Francisco Fernández de la Cueva 10th Duke of Alburquerque GE
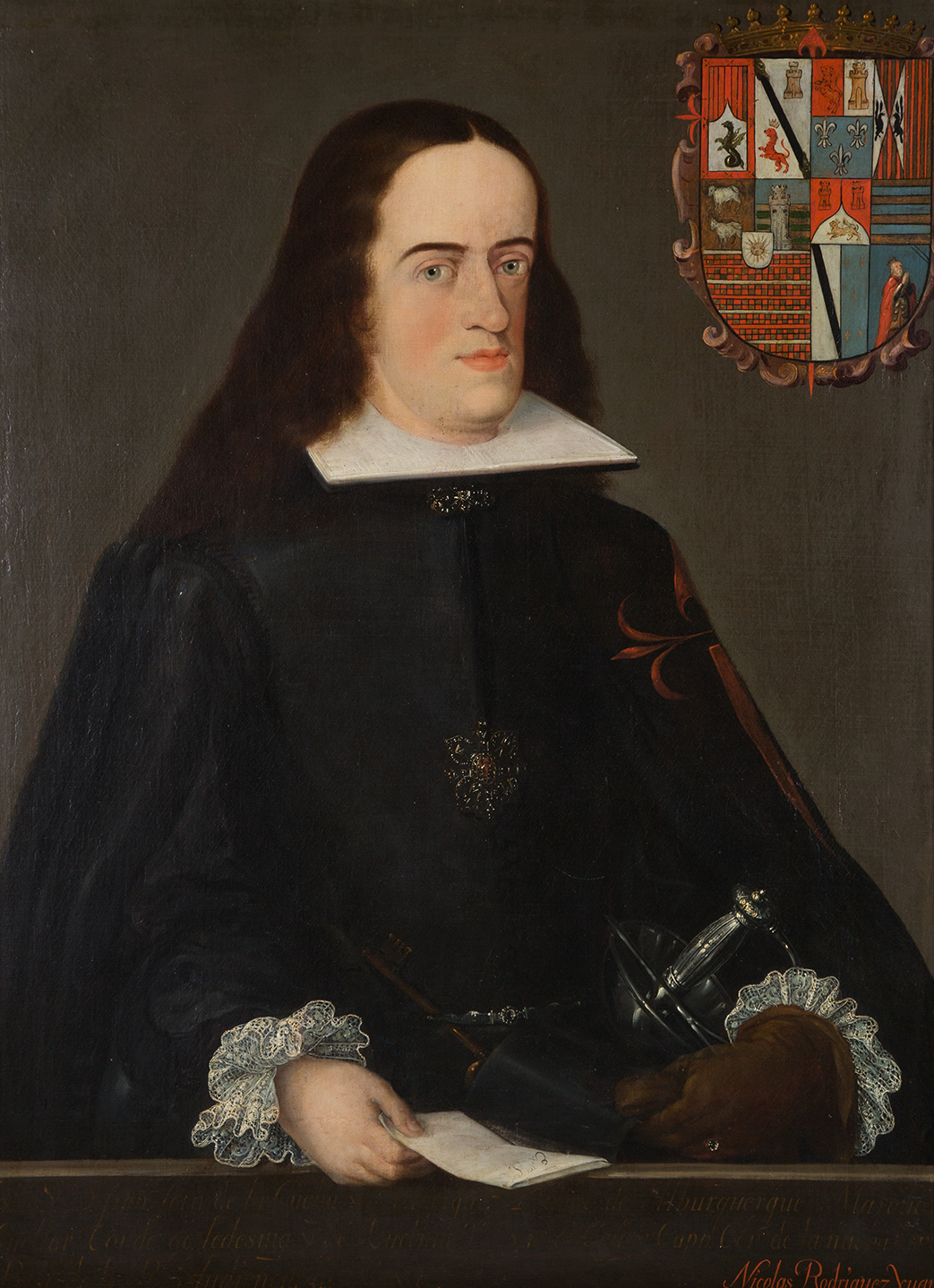

34th Viceroy of New Spain
- In office 27 November 1702 – 13 November 1710
- Monarch: Philip V
- Preceded by: Juan Ortega
- Succeeded by: The Duke of Linares

Personal details
- Born: 17 November 1666 Genoa, Italy
- Died: 28 June 1724 (aged 57) Madrid, Spain

Francisco Fernández de la Cueva y Fernández de la Cueva, (Genoa, Italy, 17 November 1666 – Madrid, Spain, 28 June 1724) was the 10th Duke of Alburquerque, a Grandee of Spain, a Knight of the Order of the Golden Fleece from 1707, and Viceroy of New Spain from 27 November 1702 to 13 November 1710. He was viceroy during the War of Spanish Succession and his tenure as Viceroy of New Spain is commemorated in the namesake of Albuquerque, New Mexico.

He was the nephew of Francisco IV Fernández de la Cueva – Colonna, (* Barcelona, 1618/1619 – † Madrid (Palacio Real) 27 March 1676), 8th Duque de Alburquerque and many other lesser titles, also a Viceroy of New Spain, (1653–1660), and Viceroy of Sicily, (1667–1670), and the son of the 9th Duke of Alburquerque, and many other lesser titles, the cadet brother of the 8th Duke, and inheritor of the titles, Melchor Fernández de la Cueva (* Madrid, 2 March 1625 – † Madrid 12 October 1686).

His father, Melchor, the 9th Duke, had married in 1665 his niece Ana Rosolea Fernández de la Cueva, the 3rd Marchioness of Cadreita, Navarre, daughter of the 8th Duke of Alburquerque Francisco IV Fernández de la Cueva and Juana Francisca Díez de Aux y Armendáriz, herself daughter of Lope Díez de Armendáriz, Viceroy of Mexico (1635–1640).

This Spanish – Equatorian, Francisco Fernández de la Cueva y Fernandez de la Cueva, 10th Duke, was thus family connected through paternal and maternal links with 2 former Viceroys of New Spain, Viceroys of México, his uncle Francisco IV, the 8th Duke of Alburquerque and Lope Díez de Armendáriz.

He was captain general of the Kingdom of Granada and captain general of the coast of Andalusia.

== His administration ==
The French had received a concession of ten years for their establishment, in Veracruz, of a French trading post dealing in black slaves. Upon his arrival in Veracruz he enforced Spanish law, and allowed their stay, until their concession was over. After which point, the French trading post was to stop operating within the slave trade, as it was illegal to openly operate such facilities within Spanish territory.

He arrived in Chapultepec in November, 1702 and made his formal entry into Mexico City on 8 December 1702. He was a fervent supporter of the Bourbon monarchy and of King Philip V of Spain, and he worked in New Spain to suppress any kind of discontent that could result in support for the Habsburg party.

This viceroy's administration was known for its luxury and magnificence. On 6 January 1703 the palace guards in the viceregal palace appeared in uniforms of the French mode for the first time, three-cornered hats and all. This attracted much attention, and fashions at the court and beyond quickly followed along the same lines. This was a fashion of luxury, starkly contrasted with the poverty of the majority of the people.

== Marriage ==
He married in Madrid, 6 February 1684, 18-year-old Juana de la Cerda y de Aragón-Moncada (* Puerto de Santa María, 27 March 1664 – † Madrid 28 June 1724), a daughter of Juan Francisco II Tomás Lorenzo de la Cerda 8th Duke of Medinaceli, 8 Duke of Alcalá de los Gazules, a Knight of the Order of the Golden Fleece, and many other lesser titles.

Their first son, inheritor of the titles, was named Francisco VI Fernández de la Cueva (* Madrid 28 September 1692 – † Hortaleza, 23. June 1757), 11th Duke of Alburquerque and many other lesser titles, who married in 1734 Agustina de Silva, deceased 10 years later, a daughter of Juan de Dios de Silva y Mendoza, (1672–1737), 10th Duque del Infantado, and María Teresa, a daughter of Francisco Domingo Gutiérrez de los Ríos, from Cordoba and Ambassador in France.

== Military affairs ==
During his tenure as viceroy, Alburquerque significantly expanded New Spain's coast guard to counter piracy in the region. During the War of the Spanish Succession, he directed the military of New Spain to prevent English and Dutch inroads into the Gulf Coast. After St. Augustine, Florida was besieged by English forces under the command of James Moore Sr., Alburquerque sent military reinforcements and supplies to the settlement, which forced Moore to lift the siege. Alburquerque also confiscated the property owned by English and Dutch subjects in New Spain, using the proceeds from selling them to fund the Spanish war effort. He also devoted military resources to protect Spanish missions in Mexico, including missions in Baja California.

During the conflict, Alburquerque also devoted significant efforts to raising money within New Spain for the war effort as well. He demanded that New Spain's clergy turn over one tenth of their tithes to the colonial government, which Juan Ortega y Montañés strongly objected to. When Alburquerque's term in office was extended, in gratitude he remitted two million pesos to the Spanish Crown. To raise it, he resorted to illegal methods such as selling government offices. Alburquerque's remittances to the Crown were so large that the colonial government found itself unable to pay the salaries of many law enforcement officers and other government employees, and they were laid off. As a result, much of New Spain's streets and highways became infested with brigands.

== Crime and rebellion ==
In 1701 the Tribunal de la Acordada (literally, Court of Agreement) was founded. It received this name as the result of a proposal agreed to by the Audiencia. It was an organization of volunteers intended to capture and quickly try bandits. From its creation to the beginning of the Mexican War of Independence in 1810, the Acordada delivered 57,500 verdicts to 62,850 accused. Of those, 35,058 were freed, 888 were hanged, 1,729 were whipped; 19,410 were sentenced to prison for one or two years and 263 to labor on public works; 777 were banished to camps in the north, and the remainder were sent on to regular judges. Three hundred forty died in hospitals and 1,280 in prison.

In 1704 the viceroy suppressed a rebellion of the Pima Indians in Nueva Vizcaya, using bloody methods. The Indians were terrorized and submitted, but in the long run this was a bad result for the Spanish. The Indians became distrustful and resisted evangelization and integration into the society of the viceroyalty.

== Reputation ==
The Duke of Alburquerque was the namesake of the Villa de Alburquerque, in Nuevo México (now New Mexico), which was founded under his administration on 23 April 1706. On 12 October 1709 San Francisco de Cuéllar (now the city of Chihuahua) was founded. Also in 1709 the Church of Santa María de Guadalupe was established.

The Duke of Albuquerque turned over the government on November 13, 1710, to his successor, Fernando de Alencastre, 1st Duke of Linares. Afterwards, he departed New Spain on January 1713, dying in Madrid on October 23, 1733.

Government offices
Preceded by Juan Ortega	Viceroy of New Spain; 1702–1711	Succeeded by The Duke of Linares
Spanish nobility
Preceded by Melchor; Fernández de La Cueva	Duke of Alburquerque; 1686–1724	Succeeded by Francisco; Fernández de La Cueva
