= Francisco Fernández de la Cueva, 2nd Duke of Alburquerque =

Spanish nobleman

Francisco Fernández de la Cueva, 2nd Duke of Alburquerque (in full, Spanish: Don Francisco Fernández de la Cueva y Mendoza, segundo duque de Alburquerque, segundo conde de Ledesma, segundo conde de Huelma, señor de los estados de Cuéllar, Mombeltrán y Pedro Bernardo) (25 August 1467 – 4 June 1526) was a Spanish nobleman.

He was the son of Don Beltrán de la Cueva, 1st Duke of Alburquerque, by first wife Doña Mencía Hurtado de Mendoza y Luna. He served the Catholic Monarchs Isabella I of Castile and Ferdinand V of Castile in the Wars of Granada along with his father.

He married before January 1485 Dona Francisca Álvarez de Toledo, daughter of García Álvarez de Toledo, 1st Duke of Alba and sister of his first stepmother, and among two other sons and two other daughters he had the oldest daughter Dona Mencía de la Cueva y Alvarez de Toledo, who married as his second wife Don Pedro Fajardo y Chacón Manrique de Lara, 1st Marquess of los Vélez.

He was the paternal grandfather of the 1st Marquess of Cuéllar in 1562, Don Francisco de la Cueva y Téllez-Girón, Alvarez de Toledo y de la Vega.

== Sources ==
- "Castillo de Cuéllar" (in Spanish). 2007. Archived from the original on 25 February 2009.
- Castro Pereira Mouzinho de Albuquerque e Cunha, Fernando de (1995). Instrumentário Genealógico - Linhagens Milenárias (in Portuguese). pp. 329–30.
- Hobbs, Nicolas (2007). "Grandes de España" (in Spanish).
- Instituto de Salazar y Castro. Elenco de Grandezas y Titulos Nobiliarios Españoles (in Spanish). periodic publication.

Spanish nobility
Preceded by Beltrán de la Cueva	Duke of Alburquerque; 1492–1526	Succeeded by Beltrán de la Cueva
