= Diego Enríquez de Guzmán =

Diego Enríquez de Guzmán, 5th count of Alba de Liste (circa 1530 – 1604), Viceroy of Sicily (1585–1591), a Knight of the Order of the Golden Fleece since the year 1600, was the son of Enrique Enriquez, 4th count of Alba de Liste (circa 1500 – 1562), and Maria Alvarez de Toledo y Pimentel (circa 1510 – ), one daughter of Garcia Alvarez de Toledo, 2nd duke of Alba (circa 1490 – 29 August 1510) and of Beatriz Pimentel, a daughter of the 4th count and 1st duke of Benavente since January 1473, Rodrigo Alfonso Pimentel.

This count title of Alba de Liste dates from the middle of the fifteenth century, being awarded to Enrique Enriquez y Mendoza. Alba de Liste, a.k.a. Alba de Aliste, is a castle, absolutely ruined today, located near some 300 inhabitants, Losacino, 41°41′N, 6°05′W in the province of Zamora, Spain.

His mother Maria Alvarez de Toledo y Pimentel was the maternal half-sister of Catalina, the wife of widower (previously left with 7 male and 7 female children), Diego Enriquez, 3rd count of Alba de Liste (circa 1490 – 1550), and therefore we can conclude that as both sisters came from the 2nd duke of Alba, Garcia, deceased aged around 20, there was no great difference of age between them and then, probably, the 5th count, Diego, son of the 4th count, Enrique, eldest son of 7 males/7 females gotten by Diego Enriquez, 3rd count, was named Diego, for keeping remembrance of his grandfather Diego, the 3rd count.

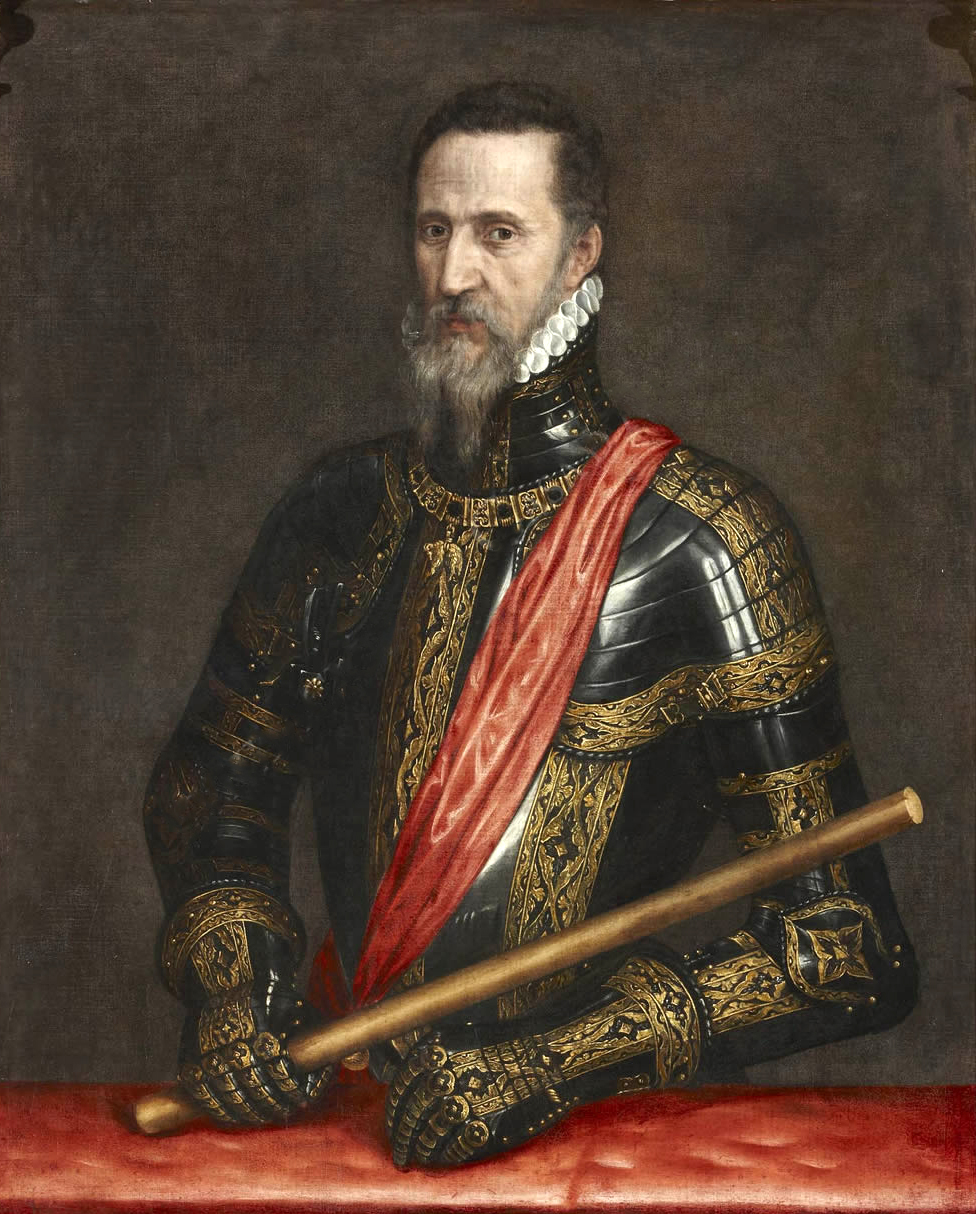
Fernando Álvarez de Toledo, 3rd Duke of Alba

Furthermore, as both sisters, Maria and Catalina, were daughters of the 2nd duke of Alba, they were also maternal half-sisters of the famous 3rd duke of Alba, Fernando Álvarez de Toledo, 3rd Duke of Alba, (Ávila, Piedrahíta, 19 October 1507 – Lisbon, Portugal, 11 November 1582), a.k.a. "The Iron Duke", who married Maria Enriquez, daughter of the 3rd count of Alba de Liste, being thus the sister of the 4th count Enrique and the aunt of the 5th count, mentioned here as Diego Enríquez de Guzmán, 5th count of Alba de Liste.

Then, it can also be deduced that the "Iron Duke", the 3rd Duke of Alba, Fernando, mentioned thereto, who married María Enriquez de Guzmán, a.k.a. Maria Enriquez, daughter of the 3rd count of Alba de Liste, was the sister of the 4th count, Enrique, and the aunt of the 5th count, mentioned here as Diego Enríquez de Guzmán, 5th count of Alba de Liste.

This 5th count married Maria de Urrea, but, apparently, there was no adult male issue. The title thus reverted to his uncle, Fadrique Enriquez, a name quite frequent in the Spanish medieval history and requiring thus extra care with delving in his life who was the 6th count of Alba de Liste, born around 1530, who married a Guiomar de Vilhena, perhaps a Portuguese woman.

Some genealogists say however the 6th count was a certain Antonio Enriquez, deceased 1610, no issue. There were court cases on who inherited then the title. Then they say a Fadrique Enriquez became the 7h count after 1617 but died in 1632. New court cases gave the title of 8 count in 1633 to a Luis Enriquez, 2nd count of Villaflor, deceased, no issue, in 1667.

Luis Enríquez de Guzmán, 9th Count of Alba de Liste, a.k.a. Luis Enrique de Guzman y Coresma (circa 1610 – circa 1680), was the 9th count of Alba de Liste, Viceroy of Mexico (1650–1653) and 17th Viceroy of Peru (1655–1661).

Then, new court cases again in 1709 gave the title, 13, Count of Alba de Liste, in a sentence of 1713, to the 10th count-duke of Benavente Antonio Francisco de Pimentel, deceased 1743, a.k.a. Antonio Francisco Pimentel de Zúñiga y Vigil de Quiñones, XIII count of de Benavides, XV count of Mayorga, XIII count of Luna, VI marquis of Jabalquinto, V marquis of Villareal de Perullena, also XIII count of Alba de Liste, who married first Maria Ignacia de Borja y Aragón, daughter of the 10th Duke of Gandía hija del X duque de Gandía etc. and then with Marie Philippe de Horne, daughter of the count of Houtekerche.

New legal fights because of the inheritance of titles to be held by the 12th Duchess of Benavente who had however already no less than six dukedoms and a number of other lesser titles, (marquess, countess, Vicomtesse) and the blocking of inheritance of this title at that time for some females gave them in 1772 to the transfer of the title to the "Fernández de Velasco" family, dukes of Frías.

Then, it was used by the "Téllez-Girón" family, dukes of Osuna, reaching later, in the case of the 21st Count, the "Martorell" family, through Gabino de Martorell y Téllez-Girón, 17th duke of Escalona, (Madrid, 22 October 1894 – deceased Madrid, 13 November 1918) changing family name, finally, because of a marriage between a Martorell female, 23rd Countess, and the "Viñamata" family, Luis Viñamata y Emmanueli, deceased on 30 November 1981, well inside the second half of the 20th century.

== See also ==
- List of viceroys of Sicily
- List of knights of the Golden Fleece
