= Fernando Enriquez de Ribera y de Moura, 6th Marquis of Tarifa =

Spanish noble

Fernando Enriquez de Ribera y de Moura, 6th Marquis of Tarifa (1614–1633), no issue, dead before his father, was the son of Fernando Afán de Ribera, 3rd Duke of Alcalá de los Gazules, 5th Marquis of Tarifa, Viceroy of Sicily, 1632–1635, and Portuguese-Spanish Lady Beatriz de Moura y Corte-Real, daughter of Portuguese nobleman Cristóbal de Moura y Távora, a.k.a. Cristóvão de Moura, (1538–1613), 1st Marquess of Castelo Rodrigo, Viceroy of Portugal, 1603–1607, and a Grandee of Spain.

Because he died before his father died and not having issue either, the titles of 7th Marchioness of Tarifa and 4th Duchesse of Alcalá de los Gazules were inherited by his sister, Ana Giron y Enriquez de Ribera, as a sign of respect towards her grandmother, something not unusual for women of the High Spanish Nobility then and/or brothers serving the Catholic Church as hierarchies.

Ana Girón y Enriquez de Ribera was married to Viceroy of Sicily, 1644–1647, Pedro Fajardo de Zúñiga y Requesens, 5th Marquis of Los Vélez since 1631 till 1647, (Mula, region of Murcia, 1602 - Palermo, Sicily, 1647), Viceroy of Valencia, 1631–1635, Viceroy of Navarre, 1638–1640, dismissed Viceroy of Catalonia, 1640–1642, and as from 1644, 9 years after the death of his brother in law, also a Viceroy of Sicily, 1644–1647, dying there, too, at Palermo, Sicily, 3 November 1647.

There was no issue either from this marriage between Ana Girón and Viceroy Pedro Fajardo de Zúñiga y Requesens. An elder sister of Fernando and Ana, Maria Enriquez Afán de Ribera y de Moura, became then in 1636 when the father of these 3 siblings died, 4th duchess of Alcalá de los Gazules, but she died only 2 years later, in 1638.

She had married on 27 November 1629, Luis Guillermo de Moncada, 7th Duke of Montalto and many other lesser titles, also a Grandee of Spain, Viceroy of Sardinia, (1644–1649), Viceroy of Valencia (1652–1659), a Knight of the Order of the Golden Fleece, who after another marriage became a priest and then a Cardinal of the Roman Catholic Church.

There was no issue either and consequently, after Maria's death in 1638 the inheritances and titles attached to the 4th dukedom of Alcalá de los Gazules passed to another woman, family related to the Enriquez de Ribera, but she would be dead by 1645. Her name was "Ana Francisca Luisa Portocarrero", (Sevilla, Spain, September 1613 - married 1625 aged 12 or 13 - Sanlúcar de Barrameda, Spain, 21 June 1645, aged only 32), 3rd marchioness of Alcalá de la Alameda and other lesser titles, married to Antonio de la Cerda, 7th Duke of Medinaceli, (1607-1671) becoming this integrated in the impressive list of titles and lands, at that time, of the ducal House of Medinaceli .
