= Francisco Fernández de la Cueva =

Francisco Fernández de la Cueva may refer to:

- Francisco Fernández de la Cueva, 2nd Duke of Alburquerque (1467 – 1526)
- Francisco Fernández de la Cueva, 4th Duke of Alburquerque (1510 - 1563)
- Francisco Fernández de la Cueva, 7th Duke of Alburquerque (1575 – 1637)
- Francisco Fernández de la Cueva, 8th Duke of Alburquerque (1619 - 1676)
- Francisco Fernández de la Cueva, 10th Duke of Alburquerque (1666 – 1724)
- Francisco Fernández de la Cueva, 11th Duke of Alburquerque (1692 - 1757)
