= Castillo de Alba, Zamora =

Town in the province of Zamora, Spain

Castillo de Alba
- Town
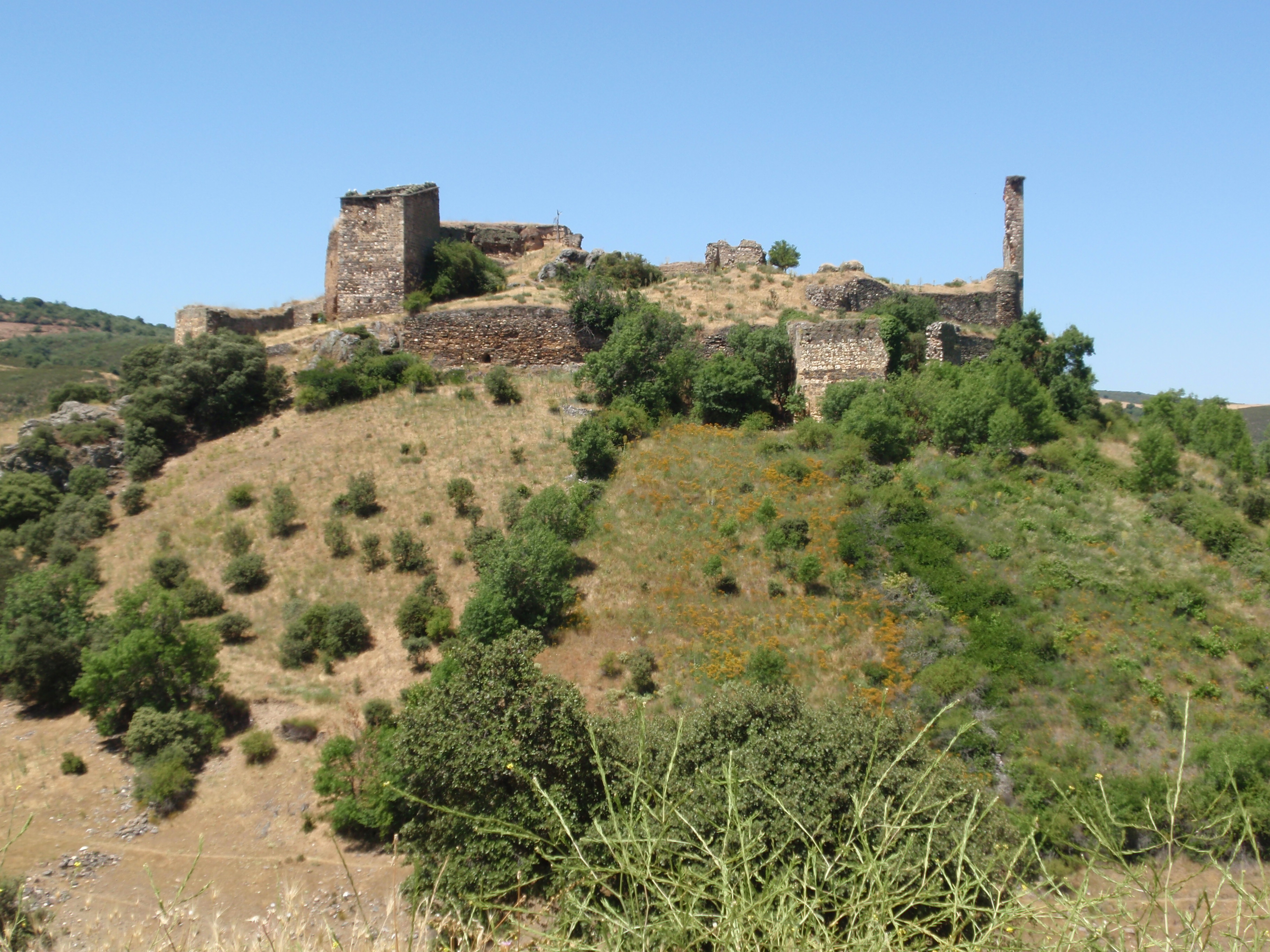

- Location within Province of Zamora Location within Spain
- Coordinates: 41°39′35″N 06°03′53″W
- Country: Spain
- Autonomous community: Castile and León
- Province: Zamora
- Comarca: Tierra de Alba
- Municipality: Losacino
- Elevation: 745 m (2,444 ft)

Population (2016)
  - Total: 5
- Postal Code: 49543

Castillo de Alba is a Spanish town in the municipality of Losacino in the province of Zamora, in the autonomous community of Castile and León.

== Geography ==
The town is located in the Alba Comarca, northwest of the city of Zamora. It is situated on the hillside of a castle, like its parish church, along the Aliste River. Its average elevation is 745 meters (2,444 ft).

== History ==
The origin of the fortress that gives the town its name can be traced back to a pre-Roman fort, which was populated later in Roman times. During the Reconquista, the area came under the control of the Kingdom of León. The current castle was originally ordered to be built by king Ferdinand II of León, and it was later reinforced by Alfonso IX and the Knights Templar.

After the independence of Portugal from the Kingdom of León in 1143, the fortress and adjacent town became the subject of several conflicts as León and Portugal both fought for control of the border.

In 1220, King Alfonso IX of León granted Castillo de Alba to the Knights Templar. For the next two centuries, the region remained part of the Templar of Alba.

During the Modern Age, Castillo de Alba was integrated into Carbajales de Alba, Zamora. In the 1833 territorial division, the town remained as part of Zamora, within the Region of León. In 1834, it was integrated into the Judicial District of Alcañices. In 1850, the old municipality of Castillo de Alba was integrated into the municipality of Losacino. In 1983, the status of Alcañices was downgraded, and Castillo de Alba was integrated into the Judicial District of Zamora along with the rest of Alcañices.
