= List of titles and honours of the Brazilian Crown =

This List of titles and honours of the Brazilian Crown sets out the titles of the monarchs of the Empire of Brazil while the monarchy was still in place.

== The titles of Brazilian emperors during the Brazilian Empire ==
Great Coat of Arms belonging to Pedro II as Emperor of Brazil

=== The full title ===
Brazilian Portuguese Version	English Translation
Sua Majestade Imperial, Dom Pedro II, Pela Graça de Deus, e Unânime Aclamação dos Povos, Imperador Constitucional, e Defensor Perpétuo do Brasil.	His Imperial Majesty, Dom Pedro II, by the Grace of God, and the Unanimous Acclamation of the People, Constitutional Emperor, and Perpetual Defender of Brazil.

=== The short title ===
Brazilian Portuguese Version	English Translation
Sua Majestade Imperial, o Imperador Pedro II do Brasil.	His Imperial Majesty, the Emperor Pedro II of Brazil.

== Titles held by the monarch of the Empire of Brazil ==
=== Empire ===
- Emperor of Brazil

== Titles held by the heir apparent of the Empire of Brazil ==
=== Principalities ===
- Prince Imperial of Brazil
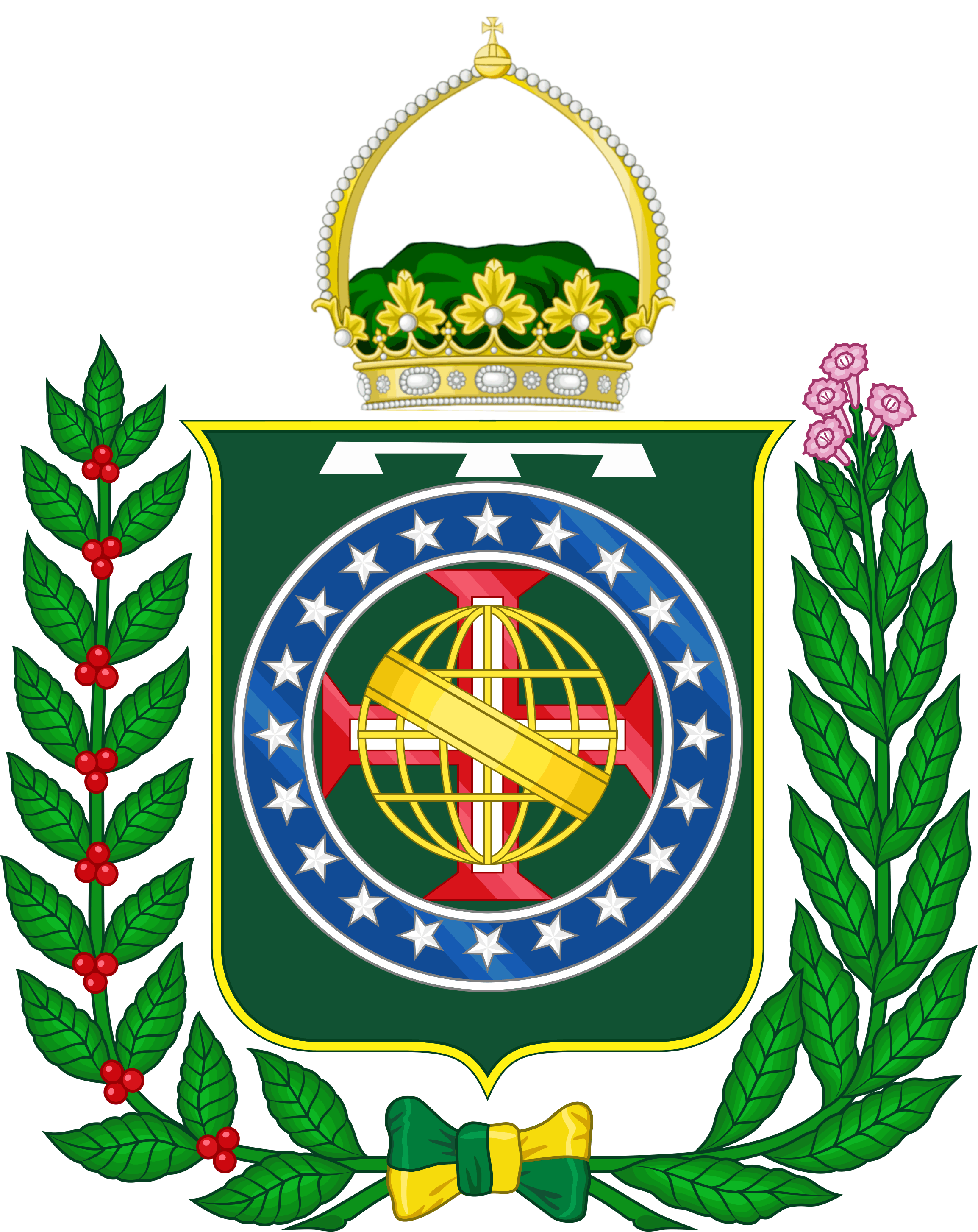
- Prince of Grão-Pará
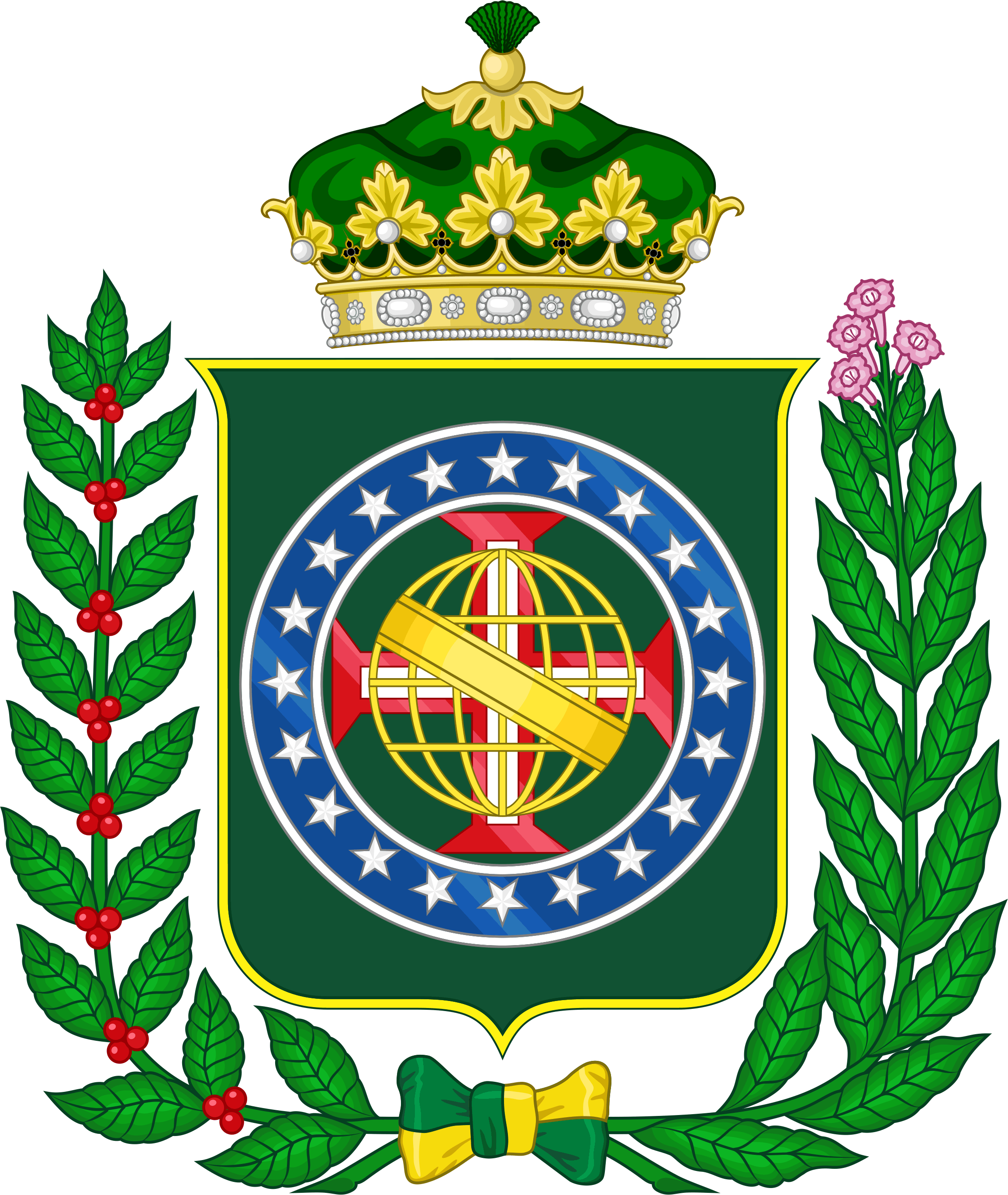
- Prince of Brazil
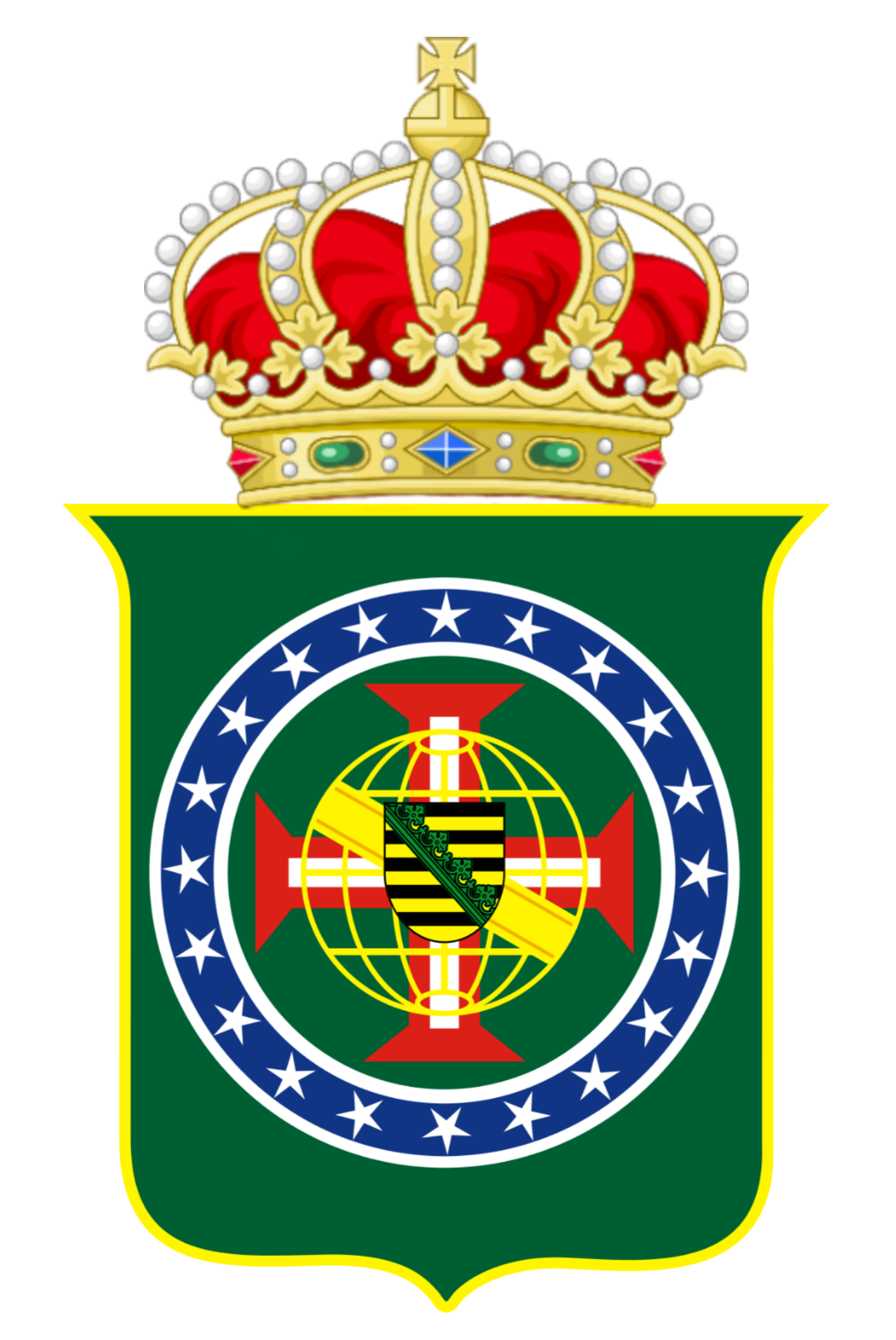
- Prince of Saxe-Coburg and Gotha
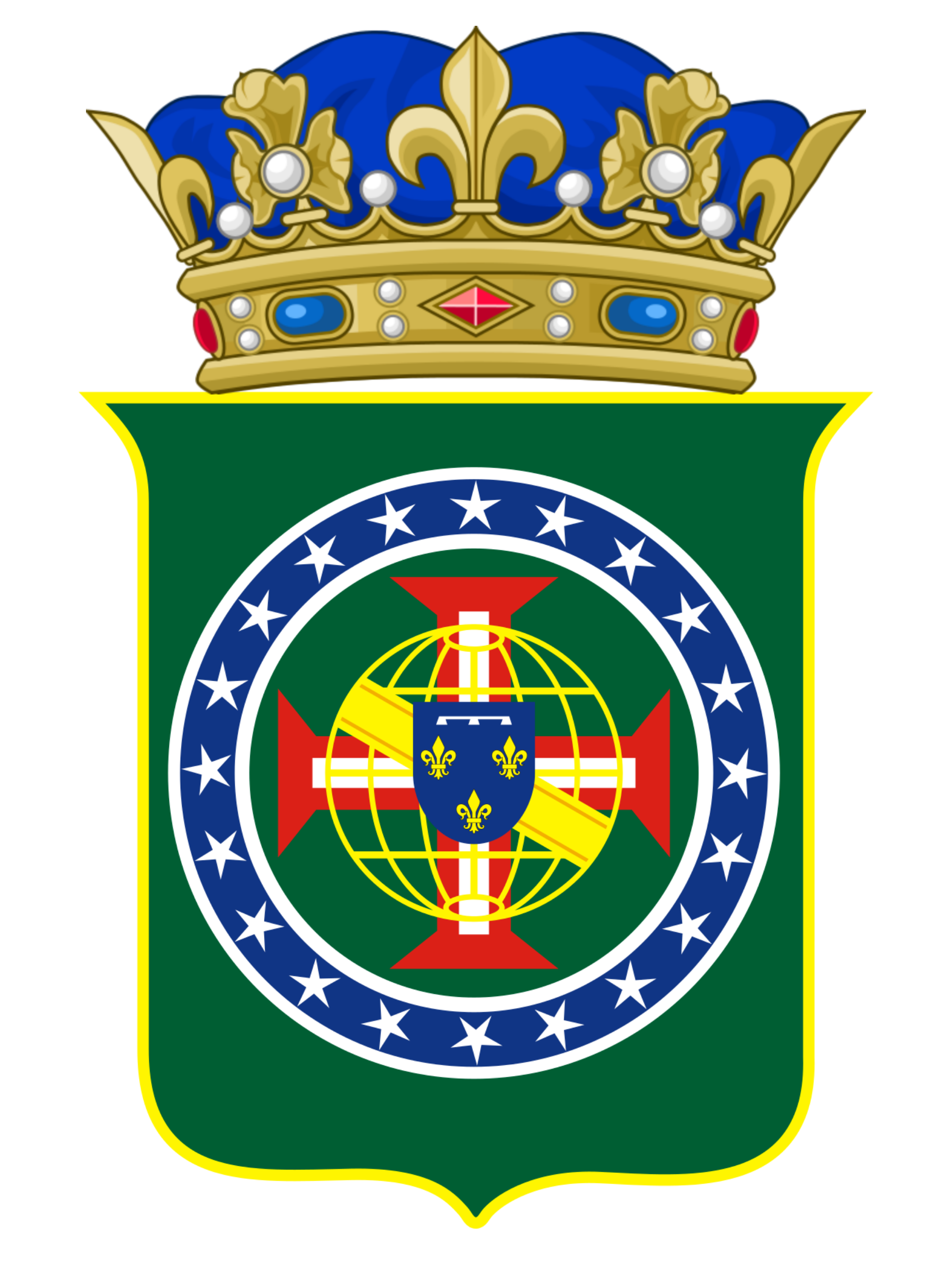
- Prince of Orléans-Braganza

=== Duchies ===
- Duke of Saxony

=== Counties ===
- Count of Aquila
- Count of Eu

=== Hereditary Orders ===
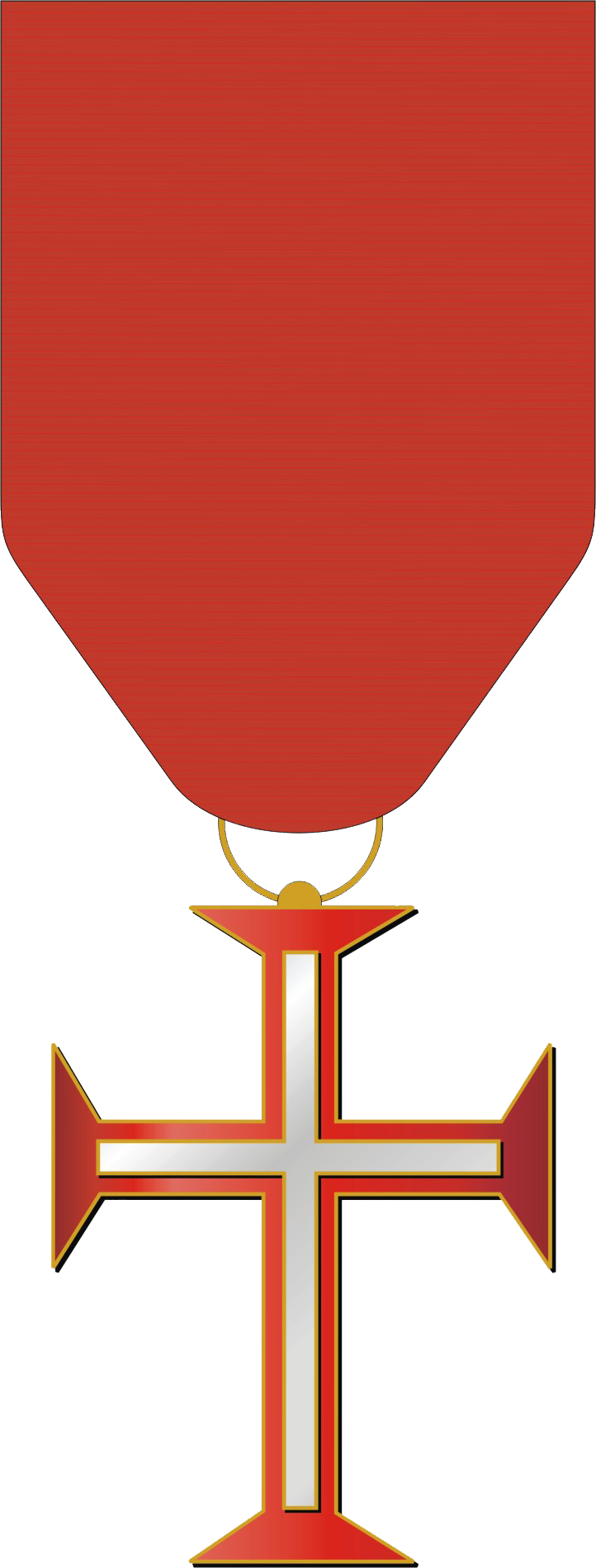
- Grand Cross of the Imperial Order of Christ
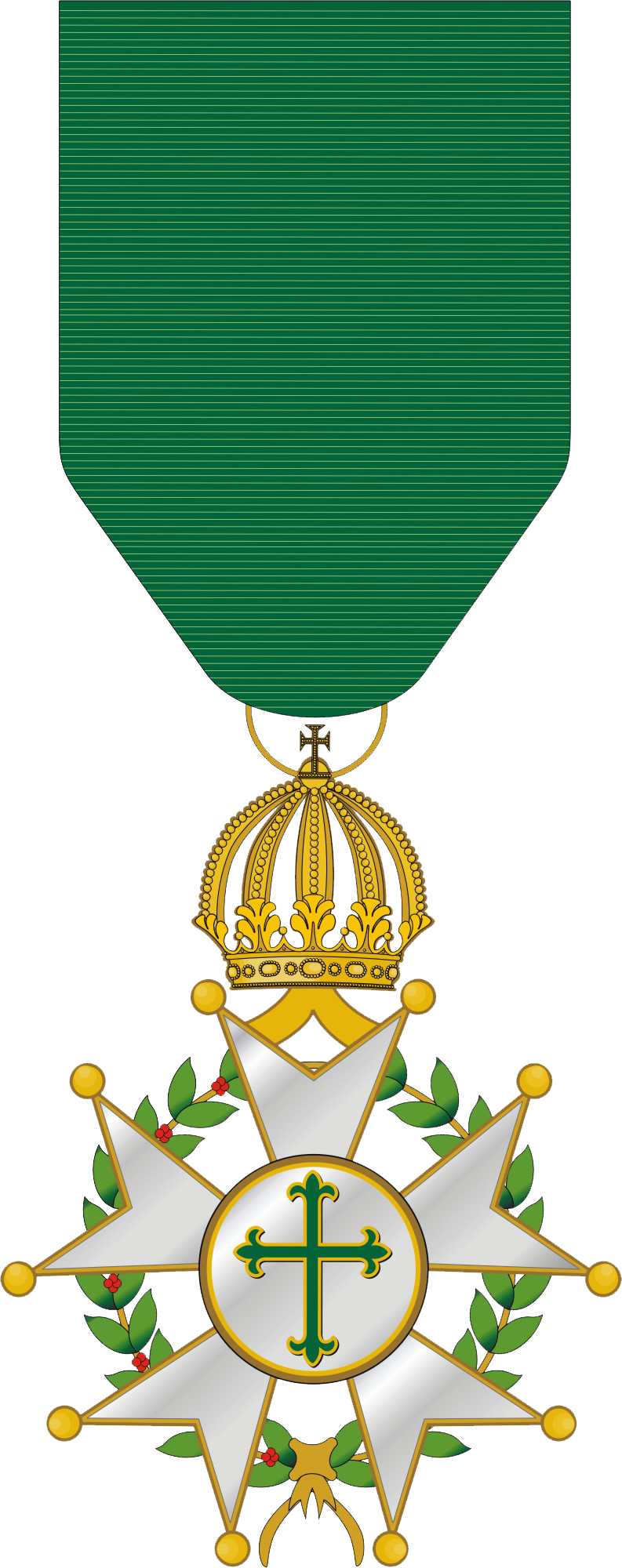
- Grand Cross of the Imperial Order of Aviz
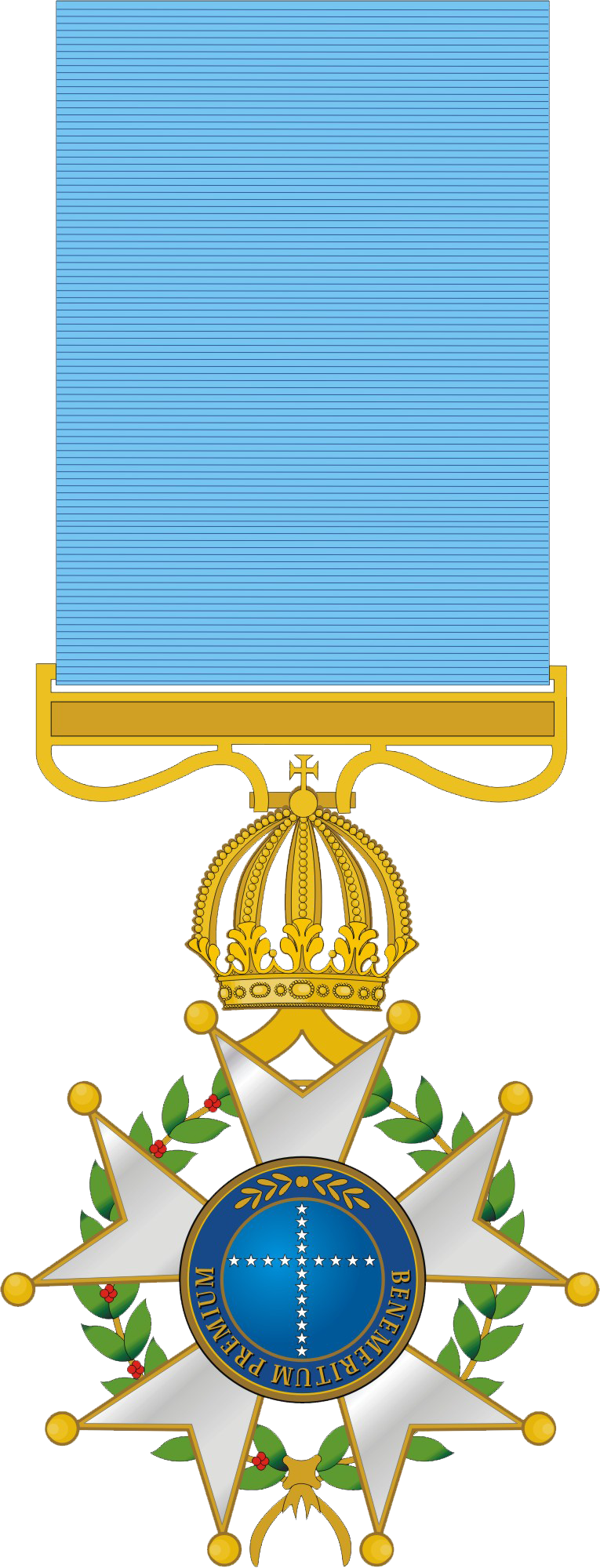
- Grand Cross of the Imperial Order of the Cross
- Grand Cross of the Imperial Order of Saint James of the Sword
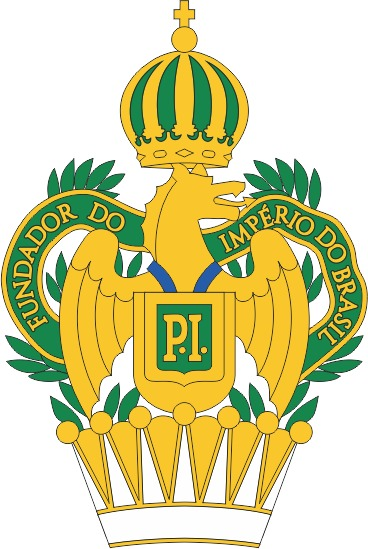
- Grand Cross of the Imperial Order of Pedro I
- Grand Cross of the Imperial Order of the Rose

== Titles held by the heir apparent to the heir apparent of the Empire of Brazil ==
=== Principalities ===
- Royal Prince of Two Sicilies
- Prince of Ligne
- Prince of Joinville

=== Duchies ===
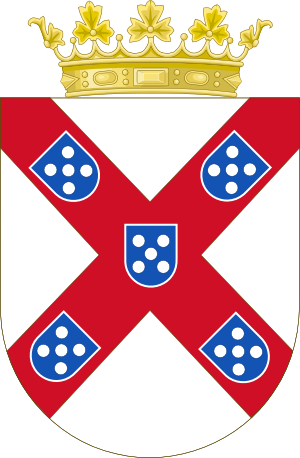
- Duke of Braganza

=== Counties ===
- Count of Paris
- Count of Nicolaÿ

== See also ==
- Brazilian nobility
