= Centelles (surname) =

Centelles is a Spanish surname. Notable people with the surname include:

- Agustí Centelles (1909–1985), Catalan photographer
- Álex Centelles (born 1999), Spanish footballer
- Francisco Centelles (1961–2025), Cuban high jumper
- Gilabert de Centelles y de Cabrera (born c. 1400), a Viceroy of Sicily
- Girolamo Centelles, Roman Catholic Archbishop of Reggio Calabria (1529–1535)

== See also ==
- Andrea Di Giovanni y Centellés (1742–1821), Sicilian nobleman of Spanish descent
- Francisco Antonio de Borja-Centelles y Ponce de Léon (1659–1702), Spanish cardinal
