= Villaflor =

Villaflor may refer to:

== Places ==
- Villaflor, Ávila, a municipality in Spain
- Villaflor, Zamora, a town in the municipality of Muelas del Pan, Spain

== People with the surname ==
- Arron Villaflor (born 1990), Filipino actor
- Azucena Villaflor (1924–1977), Argentine activist
- Ben Villaflor (born 1952), Filipino boxer
