= Princess of Ligne =

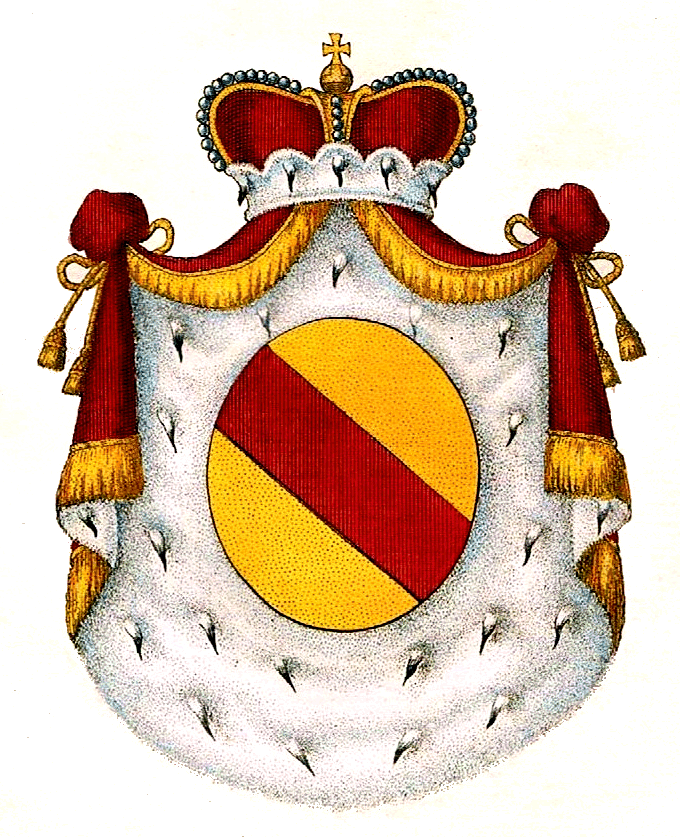
Princely arms of Ligne

Princess of Ligne is a title that is used by the wife of a Prince of Ligne.

== Baroness of Ligne ==
- 1120–?: Marguerite de Fontaines-l'Eveque (wife of Thierry I)
- 1176–?: Elisabeth d'Antoing (first wife of Thierry II)
- ?–1190: Andeline d'Havre (second wife of Thierry II)
- 1190–?: Mahaut de Mons (wife of Wauthier I)
- 1229–1234: Marguerite de Fontaines-l'Eveque (first wife of Wauthier II)
- ?–1245: Alide de Rumigny (second wife of Wauthier II)
- 1245–1245: Julianne de Rosay (first wife of Wauthier III)
- ?–?: Unnamed (second wife of Wauthier III)
- 1248–1290?: Alix d'Aspremont (third wife of Wauthier III)
- 1290–1300?: Isabelle van Strjen-Sevenbergen (wife of Jean I)
- 1305–?: Jeanne de Conde (first wife of Fastre)
- ?–1337?: Marguerite de Gavere (second wife of Fastre)
- 1340–1345?: Anne d'Antoing (wife of Michel I)
- ?–1371?: Eleonore de Lalaing (wife of Michel II)
- ?–1387: Berthe von Schleiden (wife of Guillaume)
- 1387–1435: Eustachie de Barbancon (first wife of Jean II)
- ?–1442?: Isabelle van Strjen-Sevenbergen (second wife of Jean II)
- 1442–1469: Bonne d'Abbeville (wife of Michel III)
- 1472–1486: Jacqueline de Croy (wife of Jean III)
- 1501–1525: Philipotte de Luxembourg (wife of Antoine)
- 1532–1545: Maria van Wassenaer, Burgravine van Leiden (first wife of Jacques)

== Countess of Ligne ==
Picture	Name	Father	Birth	Marriage	Became Countess	Ceased to be Countess	Death	Spouse
	Maria van Wassenaer, Burgravine van Leiden	Johannes II van Wassenaer, Burgrave van Leiden	–	9 September 1527	1545; Created Countess	1544		Jacques
	Jeanne van Hallewyn	–	–	1545		1552 husband's death	–	Jacques
	Marguerite de Lalaing	Philip de Lalaing, 3rd Count of Lalaing	–	27 March 1559		1583 husband's death	1598	Philippe
	Anne-Marie de Melun, Princess of Epinoy	Hugues II de Melun, 1st Prince of Epinoy (Melun)	–	7 September 1584		1601; Raised to Princess	25 July 1634	Lamoral

== Princess of Ligne ==
Picture	Name	Father	Birth	Marriage	Became Princess	Ceased to be Princess	Death	Spouse
	Anne-Marie de Melun, Princess of Epinoy	Hugues II de Melun, 1st Prince of Epinoy (Melun)	–	7 September 1584	1601 became Princess	6 February 1624 husband's death	25 July 1634	Lamoral
	Claire-Marie of Nassau-Siegen	John VIII, Count of Nassau-Siegen (Nassau-Siegen)	17 October 1621	27 November 1634		1 May 1641 husband's death	2 September 1695	Albert Henri
	Claire-Marie of Nassau-Siegen	John VIII, Count of Nassau-Siegen (Nassau-Siegen)	17 October 1621	May 1643		21 December 1679 husband's death	2 September 1695	Claude Lamoral I
	Juana Monica de Aragon y Benavides de Cordona y de Cordoba	Luis de Aragón y Fernández de Córdoba, 6th Duke of Segorbe	4 May 1663	12 January 1677	21 December 1679 husband's accession	18 January 1691		Henri
	Clara de Hocht	–	–	6 April 1700		8 February 1702 husband's death	–	Henri
	Maria Franziska of Liechtenstein	Prince Emanuel of Liechtenstein (Liechtenstein)	27 November 1739	6 August 1755	7 April 1766 husband's accession	13 December 1814 husband's death	17 May 1821	Charles-Joseph
	Amélie Mélanie de Conflans	Charles Louis Gabriel de Conflans, Marquis d'Armentieres (Conflans)	18 June 1802	12 May 1823		31 January 1833		Eugène
	Nathalie de Trazegnies	Georges Philippe, Marquis de Trazegnies (Trazegnies d'Ittre)	7 September 1811	28 July 1834		4 June 1835		Eugène
	Jadwiga Lubomirska	Henryk Lubomirski (Lubomirski)	29 June 1815	28 October 1836		20 May 1880 husband's death	14 February 1895	Eugène
	Elisabeth de la Rochefoucauld	Sosthène de la Rochefoucauld, 4th Duke of Doudeauville (La Rochefoucauld)	4 August 1865	24 July 1884		1907 divorced	9 November 1946	Louis
	Diane de Cosse-Brissac	Roland de Cossé, Marquis de Brissac (Cossé-Brissac)	19 December 1869	4 January 1887	27 August 1918 husband's accession	23 June 1937 husband's death	10 April 1950	Ernest
	Philippine de Noailles	François de Noailles, Prince de Poix (Noailles)	23 August 1898	28 February 1917	23 June 1937 husband's accession	26 June 1960 husband's death	13 August 1991	Eugène II
	Alix of Luxembourg	Prince Felix of Bourbon-Parma (Bourbon-Parma)	24 August 1929	17 August 1950	3 March 1985 husband's accession	21 August 2005 husband's death		Antoine
	Eleonora of Orléans-Braganza	Prince Pedro Henrique of Orléans-Braganza (Orléans-Braganza)	20 May 1953	10 March 1981	21 August 2005 husband's accession	INCUMBENT		Michel
