= Fernando Afán de Ribera, 3rd Duke of Alcalá de los Gazules =

Spanish noble and diplomat

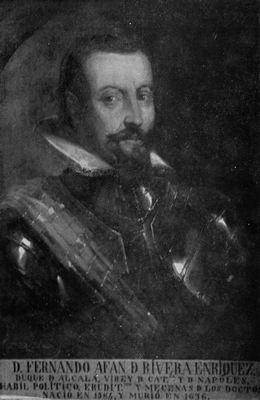
Fernando Afán de Ribera, 3rd duke of Alcalá de los Gazules

Arms of Fernando Afán de Ribera

Fernando Afán de Ribera y Téllez-Girón (10 May 1583 in Sevilla – 28 March 1637 in Villach) was a Spanish noble and diplomat.

== Biography ==
He was the 3rd Duke of Alcalá de los Gazules, 8th Count of los Molares and 5th Marquis of Tarifa. His father was Fernando Enríquez de Ribera y Cortés, 4th Marquis de Tarifa and his mother Ana Téllez-Girón, daughter of Pedro Téllez-Girón, 1st Duke of Osuna.

He was ambassador to the Holy See and vicar general of Italy during the reign of Pope Urban VIII. He was also successively viceroy of Catalonia, Naples, Sicily and Governor of Milan.

A lover of art and literature, he was a patron of several artists, including Jusepe de Ribera and Artemisia Gentileschi, and he gathered an impressive art collection in his Sevillian residence, the casa de Pilatos.

He died in 1637 in Villach, on his way to Cologne on a diplomatic mission, sent by King Philip IV of Spain as Plenipotentiary to negotiate an end to the Thirty Years' War. His remains were returned to Spain and buried in the Monastery of Santa Maria de las Cuevas.

== Family ==
He married Beatriz de Moura, daughter of Cristóbal de Moura and had 5 children :

- Fernando Enríquez (1614–1633), 6th Marquis of Tarifa, married Ana de Mendoza Sandoval, no issue.
- Margarita Enríquez, died young.
- María Enríquez (died 1639), 4th Duchess of Alcalá de los Gazules, 7th Marqueses of Tarifa, married Luis Guillermo de Moncada, 7th Duke of Montalto, no issue.
- Ana Girón Enríquez de Ribera, married Pedro Fajardo de Zúñiga y Requesens, no issue.
- Fernando Enríquez de Ribera.

He also had several illegitimate children, including

- Payo Enríquez de Rivera, who became Archbishop of Mexico and viceroy of New Spain.

Government offices
Preceded by Francisco Fernández de la Cueva, 7th Duke of Alburquerque	Viceroy of Catalonia; 1619–1622	Succeeded by Juan Sentís, Bishop of Barcelona
Preceded by Antonio Álvarez de Toledo, 5th Duke of Alba	Viceroy of Naples; 1629–1631	Succeeded by Manuel de Acevedo y Zúñiga
Preceded by Francisco Fernández de la Cueva, 7th Duke of Alburquerque	Viceroy of Sicily; 1632–1635	Succeeded by Luis Guillermo de Moncada, 7th Duke of Montalto
Preceded by Diego Felipez de Guzmán, 1st Marquis of Leganés	Governor of the Duchy of Milan; 1636–1636	Succeeded by Diego Felipez de Guzmán, 1st Marquis of Leganés
Spanish nobility
Preceded by Fernando Enríquez de Ribera	Duke of Alcalá de los Gazules; 1594–1637	Succeeded by María Enríquez de Ribera
