= Raimundo Perellós =

Ramón de Perellós, also known as Viscount of Perellós (title of 1391, province of Zaragoza, Spain) was a nobleman of the Kingdom of Aragon, Viceroy of Sicily, 1441–1443, and probably, the son of another Raymond Perellós, a.k.a. Ramón Perellós, member of the Council of king John I of Aragon, (1350–1396), who was awarded the title of 1st Viscount of Perellós, on 13 February 1391.

== The political influence of the Aragonese Viscounts of Perellós and Rueda in Italy ==
This king John I of Aragon, deceased 1396, from the House of Aragón, had one daughter Yolande of Aragon, (Zaragoza, Spain, 1384–1443), married in 1400 king Louis II of Anjou, a.k.a. king Louis II of Naples, (1377 – 29 April 1417).

Yolande of Aragon had been betrothed through Ramón Perellós earlier diplomatic missions in France in 1390 to Louis II of Anjou.
