= Francesco Caetani, 8th Duke of Sermoneta =

Italian nobleman

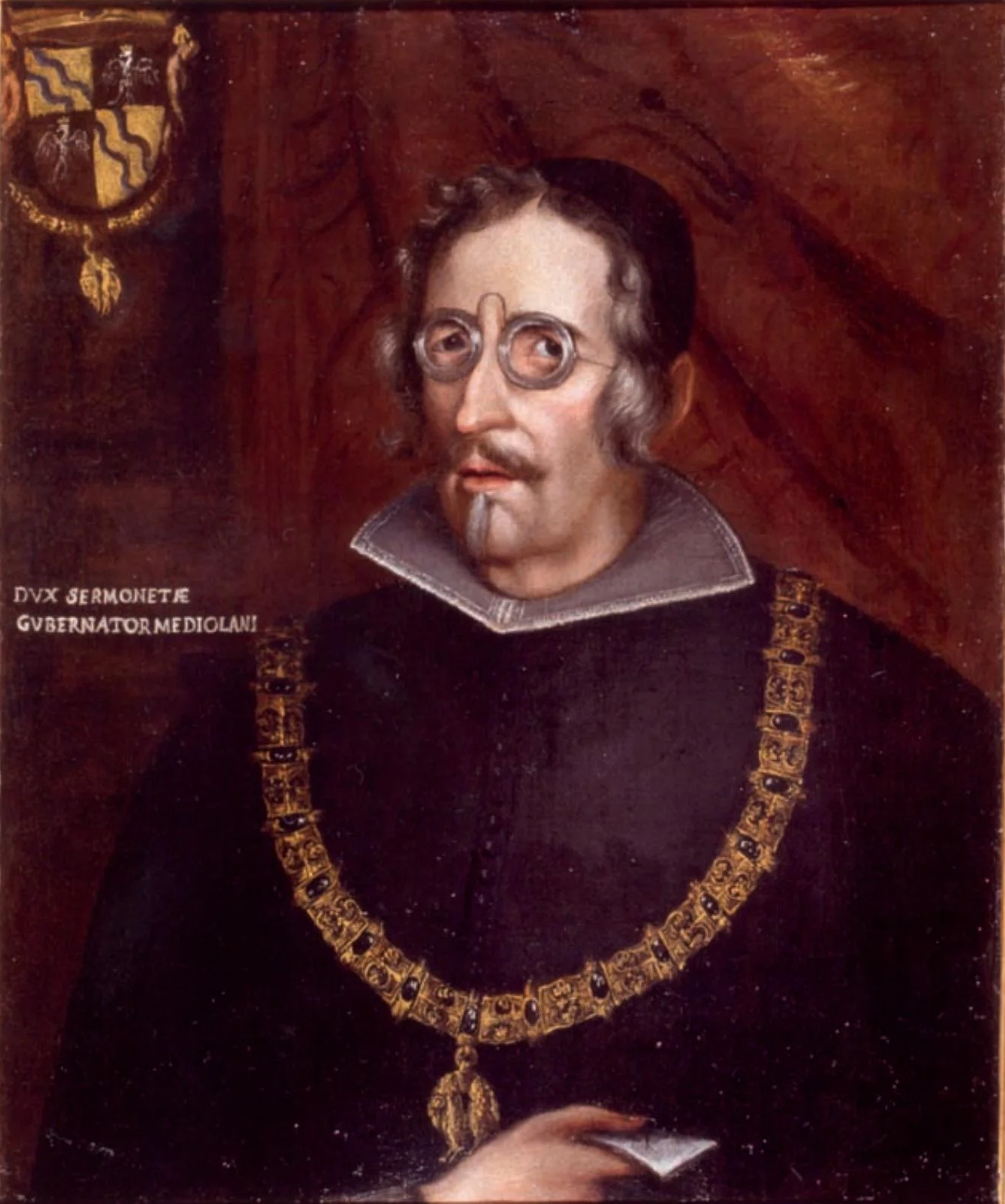
Portrait of Francesco Caetani, VIII Duke of Sermoneta, Order of the Golden Fleece

Francesco Caetani, 8th Duke of Sermoneta, (11 March 1594 – 9 October 1683) was an Italian nobleman in the service of the King of Spain.

== Biography ==
He was born in the noble Roman Caetani family as son of Filippo Caetani, VII Duke of Sermoneta and his wife, Camilla Caetani of Aragon of the Dukes of Traetto.
Aged 15, he came to Spain with his uncle, cardinal Antonio Caetani (iuniore), where he was a royal page. In 1617 he became a Grandee of Spain and returned to his estates in Italy, which were in serious financial problems. In 1626, he became a Gentleman of the chamber of King Philip IV.
After the death of his first wife Anna Acquaviva d'Aragona in 1659, he was engaged and later married Leonor Pimentel Moscoso y Toledo, daughter of Antonio Pimentel Enríquez de Guzmán y Toledo. The support of his future wife and her influential family played a decisive role in Caetani's career. He became a Knight in the Order of the Golden Fleece in 1659, Governor of the Duchy of Milan from March 1660 to September 1662, and Viceroy of Sicily from September 1662 to April 1667.

Political offices
Preceded by Alfonso Pérez de Vivero	Governor of the Duchy of Milan; 1660–1662	Succeeded by Luis de Guzmán Ponce de Leon
Preceded by Fernando de Ayala	Viceroy of Sicily; 1663–1667	Succeeded by Francisco Fernández de la Cueva
