= Pedro de Alba y Astorga =

Pedro de Alba y Astorga (c. 1601 – 1667) was a Friar Minor of the Strict Observance, and a voluminous writer on theological subjects, generally in defense of the Immaculate Conception. He was born at Carbajales and died in Belgium. He took the Franciscan habit in Peru.

He lectured on theology, was Procurator-General of the Franciscans, in Rome, and Qualificator of the Holy Office. He was an indefatigable traveller. His principal opponents were the Dominicans. His polemic had such a personal tone and was so violent that he was sent to the Low-Countries. Two editions of his work, "Nodus indissolubilis de conceptu mentis et conceptu ventris" (Madrid, 1661, 1663), are on the Index of prohibited books. His writings fill forty folio volumes. The most important is his "Armentarium Seraphicum pro tuendo Immaculatae Conceptionis titulo" (Madrid, 1648). In this he collaborated with the best theologians of the Friars Minor. A notable work also written by Pedro is “Naturae Prodigium Gratiae Portentum (Prodigy of Nature, Portent of Grace).”
