= Alfonso Pérez de Vivero, 3rd Count of Fuensaldaña =

Spanish soldier, nobleman and officeholder

Maestre de campo Alfonso Pérez de Vivero y Menchaca
- 3rd Count of Fuensaldaña; 7th Viscount of Altamira de Vivero; Lord of Barcial de la Loma, Valdesandinas, Urueña, Torrelobatón y Gema, of Merindades de Galdo y Villajuán and other more
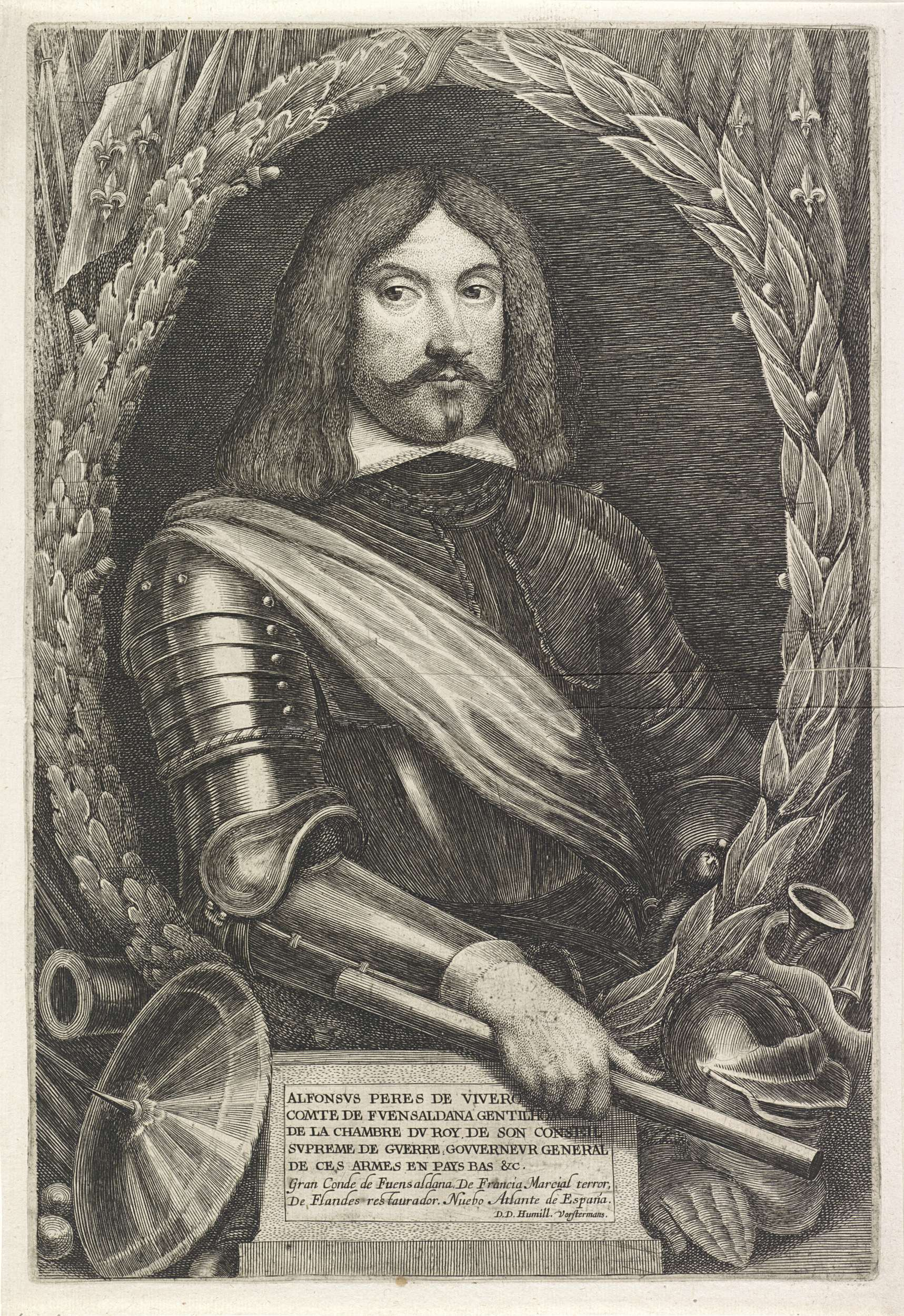
- Engraved portrait of the Count of Fuensaldaña by Lucas Vorsterman (I), produced c. 1640–1661
- Born: 1603; Valladolid, Crown of Aragon, Spanish Empire
- Died: 21 November 1661 (aged 57–58); Cambrai, Spanish Netherlands
- Father: Juan Pérez de Vivero
- Mother: María de Menchaca y Velázquez
- Occupation: Commander and statesman

Governor of the Duchy of Milan
- In office 13 January 1656 – 26 February 1660
- Monarch: Philip IV
- Valido: Luis de Haro
- Preceded by: Gian Giacomo Teodoro Trivulzio
- Succeeded by: Francesco Caetani

Military service
- Allegiance: Spanish Empire
- Branch/service: (Spain) Spanish Army (Spain) Army of Flanders
- Years of service: 1632–1660
- Rank: Maestre de campo
- Battles/wars: Thirty Years' War: Franco-Spanish War; Battle of Les Avins; Siege of Cateau-Cambrésis; Battle of Rocroi; Battle of Lens; Battle of Arras; Portuguese Restoration War

Alfonso Pérez de Vivero (Valladolid, 1603 – Cambrai, 21 November 1661), Count of Fuensaldaña, was a Spanish soldier, nobleman and officeholder.

In 1632, when in his late twenties, he went to Flanders with a commission as captain of a company in the Army of Flanders. In 1635 he became governor of the citadel of Cambrai, and in 1636 maestre de campo. He was general of artillery on the French front in 1640–1641, general of cavalry on the Dutch front in 1643, general of infantry on the French front 1644–1646, and governor of arms (second-in-command of the whole army) 1648–1656. He was Governor of Milan from 1656 to 1660. In 1660 he retired from public life, withdrawing to Cambrai, where he died.

== Sources ==
- Fernando González de León, The Road to Rocroi: Class, Culture and Command in the Spanish Army of Flanders (History of Warfare 52; Brill, Leiden, 2009)

Political offices
Preceded by Cardinal Teodoro Trivulzio	Governor of the Duchy of Milan; 1656–1660	Succeeded by Francesco Caetani, 8th Duke of Sermoneta
