= Lope Ximénez de Urrea y de Bardaixi =

Spanish-Italian noble

Lope III Ximénez de Urrea y de Bardaixi, Viceroy of Sicily, fought during the Italian Wars and was involved in the Conquest of Naples, Italy.

== Family ==
His first marriage was to Beatriz Ruiz de Liori. He later married Catalina de Centelles y de Cabrera. They had two children: 1) Beatriz Ximenez de Urrea y de Centelles who married Francisco Gilabert de Centelles y Queralt, her cousin; and 2) Lope IV Ximénez de Urrea y de Centelles, 1st Count of Aranda.
