= Luis Guillermo de Moncada, 7th Duke of Montalto =

Spanish nobleman and Roman Catholic cardinal

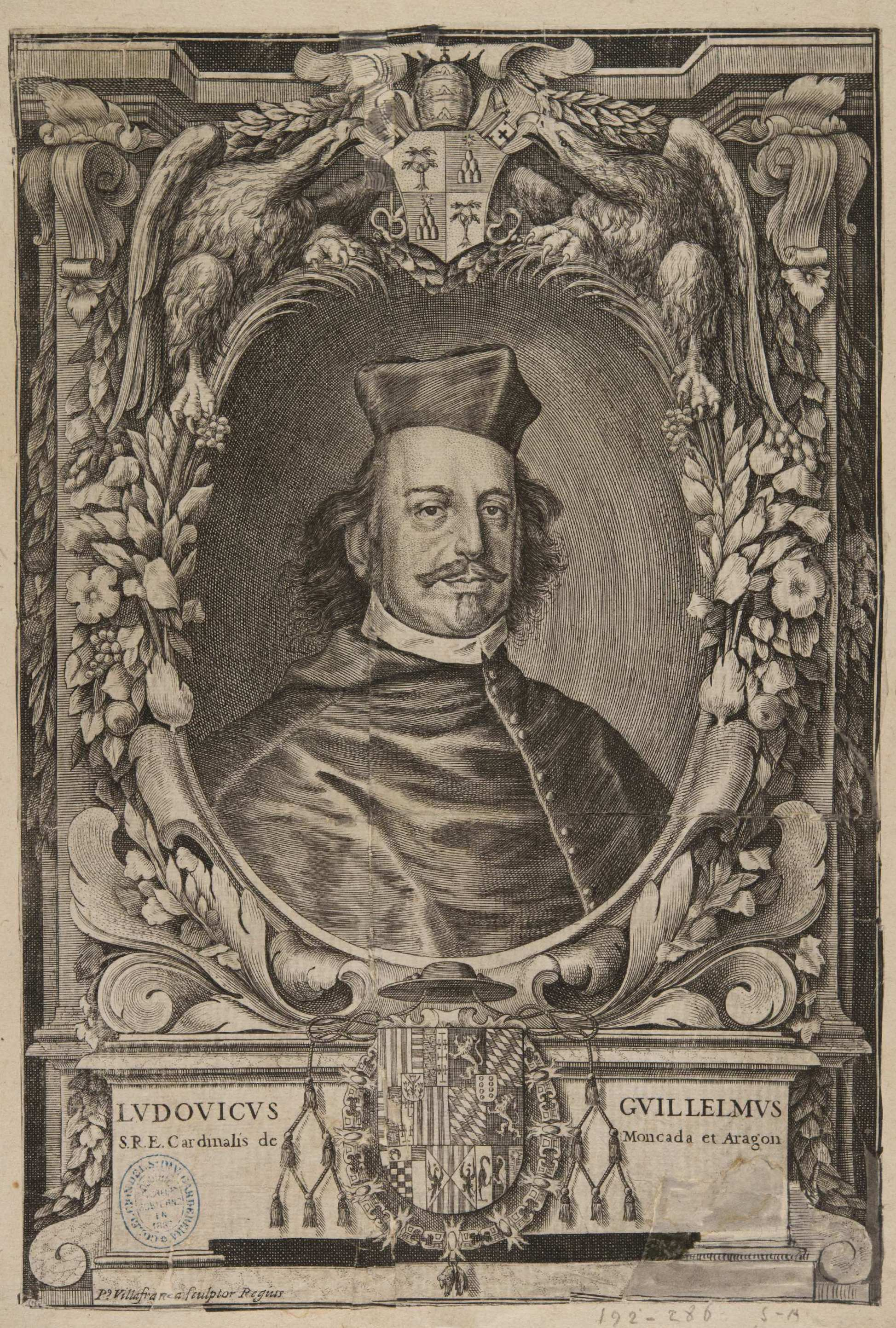
Cardinal Luis de Moncada y Aragón

Luis Guillermo de Moncada Aragon Luna y Cardona (Collesano, 1 January 1614 - Madrid, 4 March 1672) was a Spanish nobleman and Roman Catholic cardinal. He was a Knight of the Military Order of Alcantara in 1630, Viceroy of Sicily 1635 -1639, Captain General and Viceroy of Sardinia (1644), Viceroy of Valencia in 1652 and a Knight of the Order of the Golden Fleece in 1651.

== Biography ==
Born at Collesano on 1 January 1614, as a son of Antonio de Aragón y Moncada, 6th Duke of Montalto, he was a cadet brother of Antonio de Moncada, 4th Duke of Bivona, 5th Prince of Paternò, 7th Duke of Montalto and a Grandee of Spain, who by his own rights had renounced to his "Ducal vanities" in 1631, leaving to Luis, aged 17, his titles and honours.

First he married Maria Enriquez Afan de Ribera y de Moura (IV duchesse of Alcalà de los Gazules), daughter of Fernando Afán de Ribera, duke of Alcalá de los Gazules, who died without children in 1638.

He remarried Catalina de Moncada y de Moncada y de Castro y Alagon, (21 August 1611 - deceased 1660), the daughter of Francisco de Moncada, 3rd Marquis of Aitona (1586-1635), with whom he had one son, Fernando de Aragón y Moncada (1644 - 1713).

When his second wife, Catalina, died towards the end of 1660, he became a priest around 1662, aged 48, being promoted to the honor of Cardinal without title of the Holy Roman Church on 7 March 1667, under the protection of Pope Clement IX. He was the highest representative of the Papal States in Madrid until his death.

He died 4 May 1672 in Madrid, and was buried in the tomb of the duke of Alcalá de los Gazules, his first father in law, in the Capuchin convent of San Antonio, Madrid.

His remains were transferred in 1674, according to his will, to the church of San Domenico Maggiore in Naples.
