= Henri, 4th Prince of Ligne =

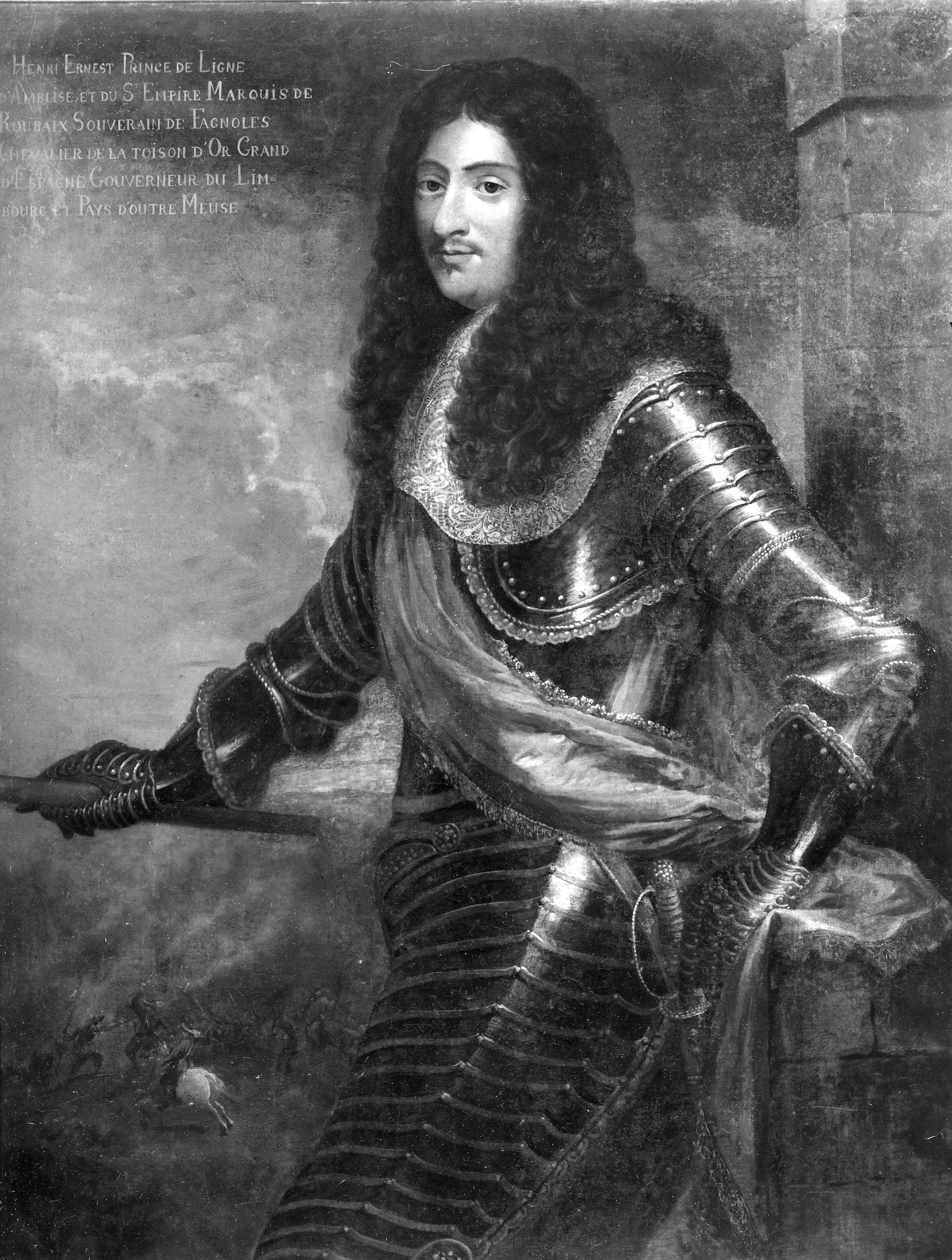
Portrait of Prince Henri Louis Ernest de Ligne, Marquis de Roubaix (1644-1702)

Henri Louis Ernest of Ligne (2 February 1644 – 8 February 1702) was a Southern Netherlands nobleman from the House of Ligne and the 4th Prince of Ligne, Amboise, and Épinoy.

== Biography ==
He was born to Claude Lamoral, 3rd Prince of Ligne and Clara Maria of Nassau-Siegen. As the eldest son, he bore the title Marquis of Roubaix and accompanied his father on his mission to Charles II of England in 1660.

In 1657, he was made a Knight of the Order of Calatrava, followed in 1684 by the Order of the Golden Fleece (certificate no. 532). In 1685, he succeeded his maternal uncle, John Francis Desideratus, Prince of Nassau-Siegen, as Stadtholder of Limburg.

According to the memoirs of his grandson Charles-Joseph de Ligne, he died while hunting, waiting for a wild boar.

=== Marriage and children ===
He married in Madrid in 1677 the Spanish Doña Juana Monica de Aragon y Benavidez (†1691), daughter of the 6th Duke of Segorbe. The couple had the following children :

- Marie Anne Antoinette (1680-1720) married in 1694 Philippe Emmanuel, Prince of Hornes
- Antoine Joseph Ghislain (1682-1707), 5th Prince of Ligne
- Claude Lamoral (1685-1766), 6th Prince of Ligne and Imperial Field marshal
- Ferdinand (1686-1757), Imperial Colonel in 1717, General and Field marshal (1754) under Maria Theresa
- Hubert (c. 1688-1695)
- Ernest Henri Philippe (1688-1710)
- Gaspar Melchior Balthazar (1691-1702)

Henri, 4th Prince of Ligne House of Ligne Born: 2 February 1644 Died: 8 February 1702
Regnal titles
Preceded by Claude Lamoral	Prince of Ligne; 1679–1702	Succeeded by Antoine
Government offices
Preceded by Prince of Nassau-Siegen	Stadtholder of Limburg; 1685–1702	Succeeded by Franz Sigismund of Thurn und Taxis
