= Francisco Fernández de la Cueva, 7th Duke of Alburquerque =

Spanish diplomat (1575-1637)

Francisco Fernández de la Cueva y de la Cueva, 7th Duke of Alburquerque (in full, Spanish: Don Francisco Fernández de la Cueva y de la Cueva, séptimo duque de Alburquerque, séptimo conde de Ledesma, séptimo conde de Huelma, cuarto marqués de Cuéllar, señor de los estados de Mombeltrán, Pedro Bernardo, La Codosera y otros) (Cuéllar, 1575 – Madrid, 18 July 1637) was a Spanish nobleman, military and politician.

== Biography ==
He was the son of Don Beltrán III de la Cueva y Castilla, 6th Duke of Alburquerque and Isabel de la Cueva y Córdoba.

In 1617, he was appointed Viceroy of Catalonia, a function in which he became known as "one of the toughest, most rigorous, and successful of the viceroys of Catalonia...and had specialized in the suppression of disorder." To suppress "banditism", he didn't hesitate to clash with the local authority, the Principality of Catalonia, and to restrict the Catalan constitution.

Between 1627 and 1632, he was Viceroy of Sicily, where he had 2 bronze statues erected of Kings Charles I and Philip IV. He was also a member of the Spanish Council of State and the War Council under King Philip IV. He served as Ambassador to the Holy See and finally was President of the Council of Italy and Council of Aragon.

== Marriage and children ==
Francisco Fernández de la Cueva married 3 times and had 10 children.

First he married with Doña Antonia de Toledo-Beaumont, sister of Antonio Álvarez de Toledo, 5th Duke of Alba, who died without children.

He married again with Ana María de Padilla, daughter of Martín de Padilla y Manrique, who deceased before 1614. Their only son, Beltran, died on 12 December 1617, aged 17.

In his 3rd marriage, the Duke married in 1614 with Ana Enríquez de Cabrera y Colonna, daughter of the Duke of Medina de Rioseco and had:

1. Francisco Fernández de la Cueva y Enríquez de Cabrera (1618–1676), 8th Duke of Alburquerque.
2. Gaspar de la Cueva y Enríquez de Cabrera, General of the artillery in the Army of Extremadura during the war with Portugal.
3. Melchor Fernández de la Cueva y Enríquez de Cabrera (1625–1686), 9th Duke of Alburquerque. Who married his niece, the daughter of the 8th Duke.
4. Baltasar de la Cueva, Count of Castellar (1627–1686), Viceroy of Peru.
5. José de la Cueva y Enríquez, Canon (priest).
6. Isabel de la Cueva y Enríquez, married firstly with Jorge de Cárdenas y Manrique de Lara and secondly with Pedro Nuño Colón de Portugal y Castro, Viceroy of New Spain.
7. Ana de la Cueva y Enríquez, married Juan Enríquez de Borja y Almansa.
8. María de la Cueva y Enríquez, died young.
9. Victoria de la Cueva y Enríquez, died young.

== Sources ==
Government offices
Preceded by Francisco Hurtado de Mendoza y Cárdenas	Viceroy of Catalonia; 1617–1619	Succeeded by Duke of Alcalá de los Gazules
Preceded by Enrique Pimentel	Viceroy of Sicily; 1627–1632	Succeeded by Duke of Alcalá de los Gazules
Spanish nobility
Preceded by Beltrán III de la Cueva y Castilla	Duke of Alburquerque; 1612–1637	Succeeded by Francisco IV Fernández de la Cueva
