= Carbajales de Alba =

Coordinates: 41°39′N 6°00′W

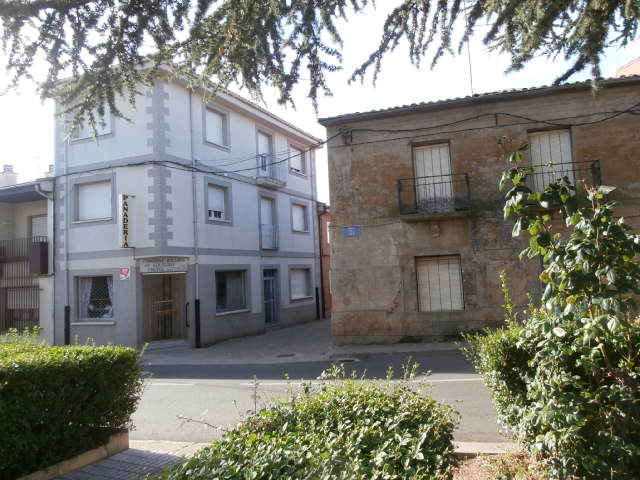

- Flag Coat of arms
- Interactive map of Carbajales de Alba
- Country: Spain
- Autonomous community: Castile and León
- Province: Zamora
- Municipality: Carbajales de Alba

Population (2025-01-01)
  - Total: 463
- Time zone: UTC+1 (CET)
  - Summer (DST): UTC+2 (CEST)
- Website: www.carbajales.com

Carbajales de Alba is a village and municipality located in the northwest of the province of Zamora in the autonomous community Castile-Leon of Spain. Carbajales' population is approximately 700.

== Notable people ==
- Pedro d'Alva y Astorga
