= Claude Lamoral, 3rd Prince of Ligne =

Claude-Lamoral
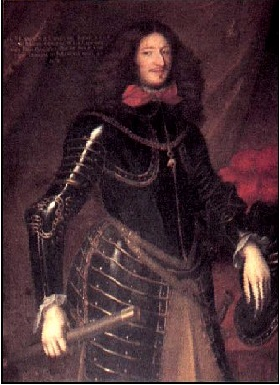

Prince of Ligne
- Reign: 1 May 1641 – 21 December 1679
- Predecessor: Albert Henri
- Successor: Henri
- Born: 8 October 1618; Château de Belœil
- Died: 21 December 1679 (aged 61); Madrid
- Spouse: Countess Claire Marie of Nassau-Siegen
- Issue: Henri, 4th Prince of Ligne; Louise Claire, Duchess of Aveiro; Prince François Albert; Prince Nicolau; Claude Lamoral Alphonse, Count of Faucquenberg; Princess Marie Henriette; Princess Francisca; Procope Hyacinthe, Marquis of Moÿ; Princess Ernestina Francisca; Charles Joseph, 2nd Marquis of Arronches; Prince Vitor
Names
- Claude Lamoral de Ligne
- House: House of Ligne
- Father: Florent, 1st Prince of Amblise
- Mother: Louise de Lorraine, Lady of Busigny
- Religion: Roman Catholicism

Claude Lamoral, 3rd Prince of Ligne, Prince of Epinoy, Marquis of Roubaix and Count of Fauquemberg (8 October 1618 – 21 December 1679), was a nobleman from the Spanish Netherlands, a soldier and diplomat in the service of Philip IV of Spain and Charles II of Spain.

== Biography ==
Born at Belœil, he succeeded his brother Albert Henry (1615–1641), as third Prince of Ligne. He married in 1642 his brother's widow Claire Marie of Nassau-Siegen, countess of Nassau (Brussels, October 1621 – Belœil, 2 September 1695). He was a Prince of the Holy Roman Empire, Grandee of Spain and Knight in the Order of the Golden Fleece (1646).

Between 1649 and 1669, he was Captain General of the Spanish Cavalry in the Spanish Netherlands, which was the third highest military position after Captain General and Governor of the Arms.

In 1660, he was sent as representative of the Spanish King to the Royal court of Charles II of England as first foreign recognition of the newly restored English monarchy.

He became Viceroy of Sicily (1670–1674), where he fortified the coastal defences against Turkish pirates, who attacked the local population to abduct and sell them into slavery.

Later he was appointed Governor of the Duchy of Milan (1674–1678).

Claude Lamoral, and after his death, his wife Claire Marie, enlarged the Chateau of Belœil and its spectacular French-styled 25 hectare garden, which has a 6 hectare lake in front of the castle. Today the gardens are partially open to the public.

== Children ==
From his marriage to Claire Marie of Nassau-Siegen, daughter of John VIII of Nassau-Siegen, he had 11 children, 5 of whom reached adulthood :

- Henri, 4th Prince of Ligne (1644–1702)
- Procope-Hyacinthe (1659-1723), marquis de Moy, baron de La Fauche, married Anne Catherine de Broglie (1663-1701), had issue
- Charles-Joseph (pt) (1661-1713), Grandee of Portugal, married Mariana de Sousa, Marchioness of Arronches, had issue
- Louise Claire, married in 1664 the Portuguese nobleman Raimundo de Lencastre (1631-1666). She remarried with the Spanish nobleman Iñigo Manuel Velez Ladrón de Guevara y Tassis (1642–1699). Had issue by her second marriage.
- Marie (died 1675).

== Ancestry ==
Ancestors of Claude Lamoral, 3rd Prince of Ligne

16. Jacques, Count of Ligne
8. Philippe, Count of Ligne
17. Maria van Wassenaer, Burgravine van Leiden
4. Lamoral, 1st Prince of Ligne
18. Philipp de Lalaing, Count of Hoogstraeten
9. Margarethe de Lalaing
19. Anna von Rennenberg
2. Florent, 1st Prince of Amblise
20. François de Melun, Count of Epinoy
10. Hugues II de Melun, 1st Prince of Epinoy
21. Louise de Foix-Candale
5. Anne-Marie de Melun, Princess of Epinoy
22. Pierre de Barbançon-Werchin, Lord of Werchin
11. Yolande de Barbançon-Werchin, Lady of Roubaix
23. Hélène de Vergy
1. Claude Lamoral, 3rd Prince of Ligne
24. Antoine, Duke of Lorraine
12. Nicolas de Lorraine, Duke of Mercœur
25. Renée de Bourbon
6. Henri de Lorraine, Count of Chaligny
26. Claude de Guise, Duke of Aumale
13. Catherine Romula de Lorraine
27. Louise de Brézé, Lady of Anet
3. Louise de Lorraine, Lady of Busigny
14. Charles, 1st Marquis of Moy
7. Claude de Mouy, Marquise of Mouy, Countess of Cerny
15. Catherine de Suzanne, Countess of Cerny

Gallery
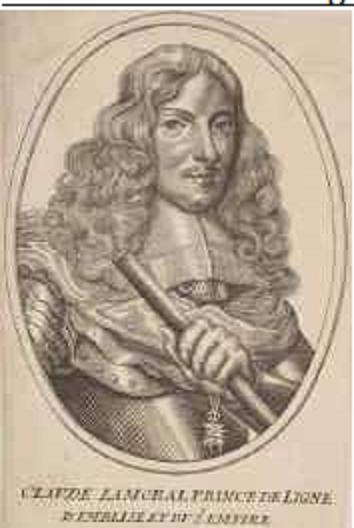
Claude Lamoral, Third Prince de Ligne, Belgian diplomate in the service of Philip IV and Charles II of Spain

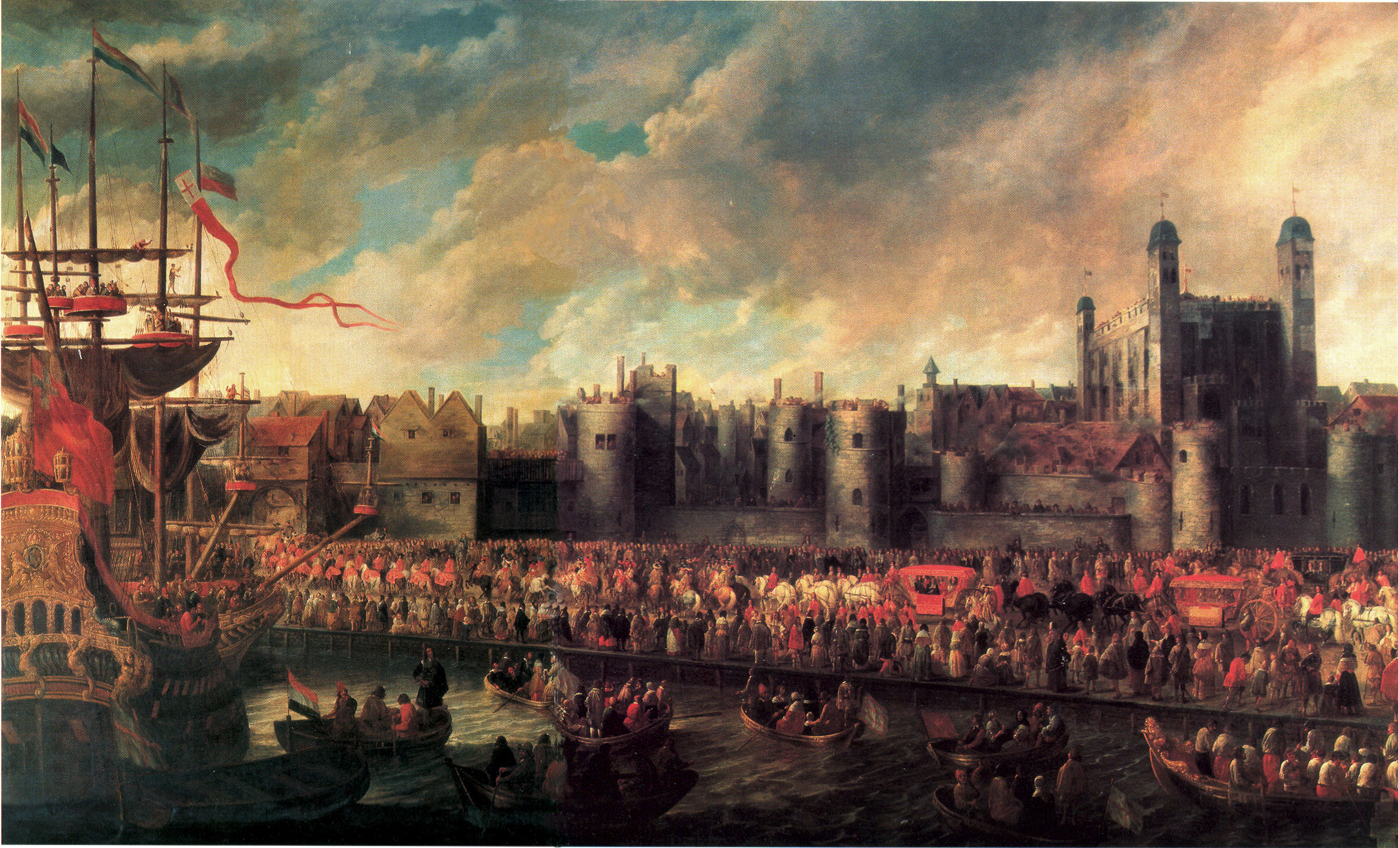
Painting by François Duchatel commemorating the entry of Lamoral in London in 1660

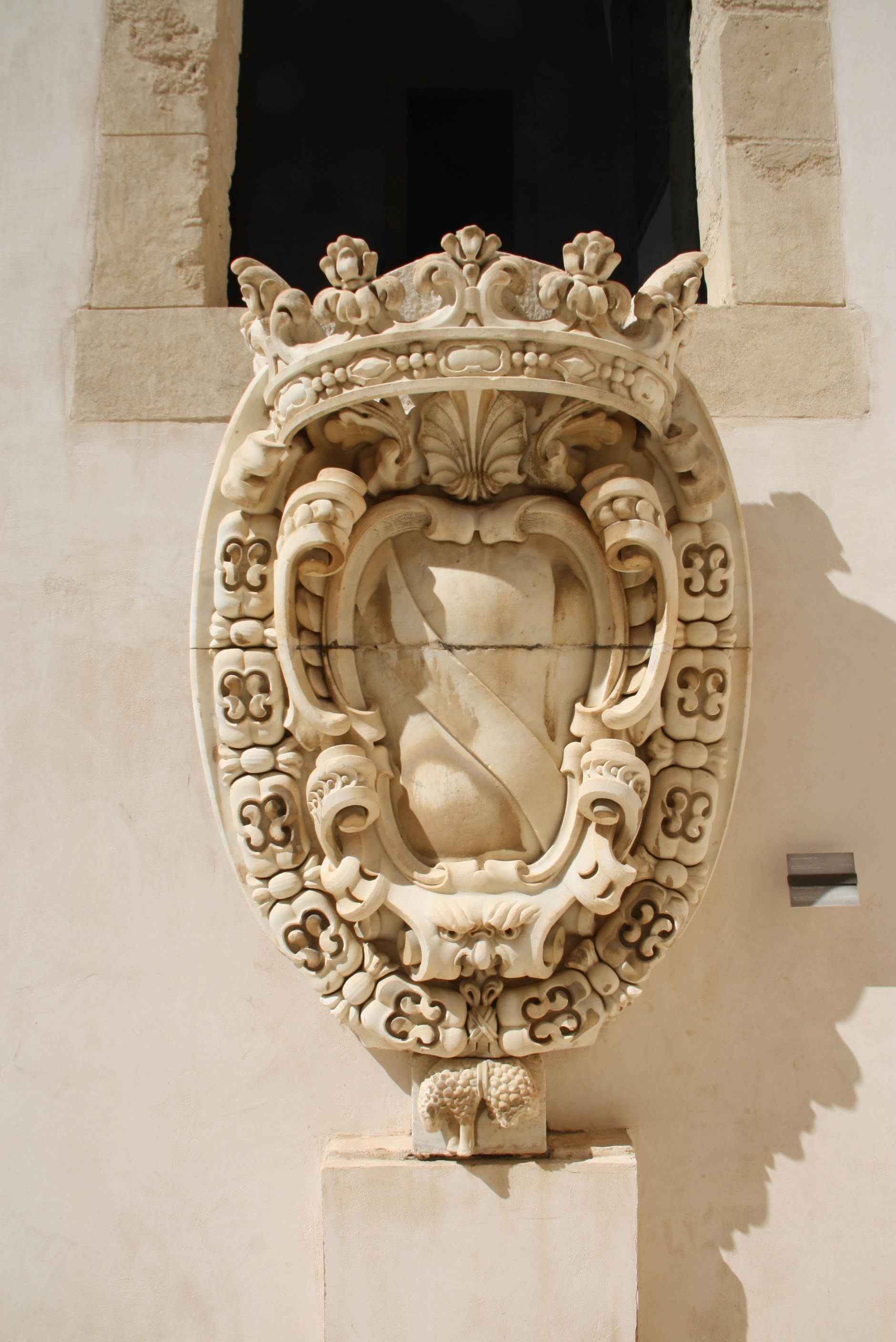
Coats of arms of Claude Lamoral de Ligne as Viceroy of Sicily, in Syracuse.

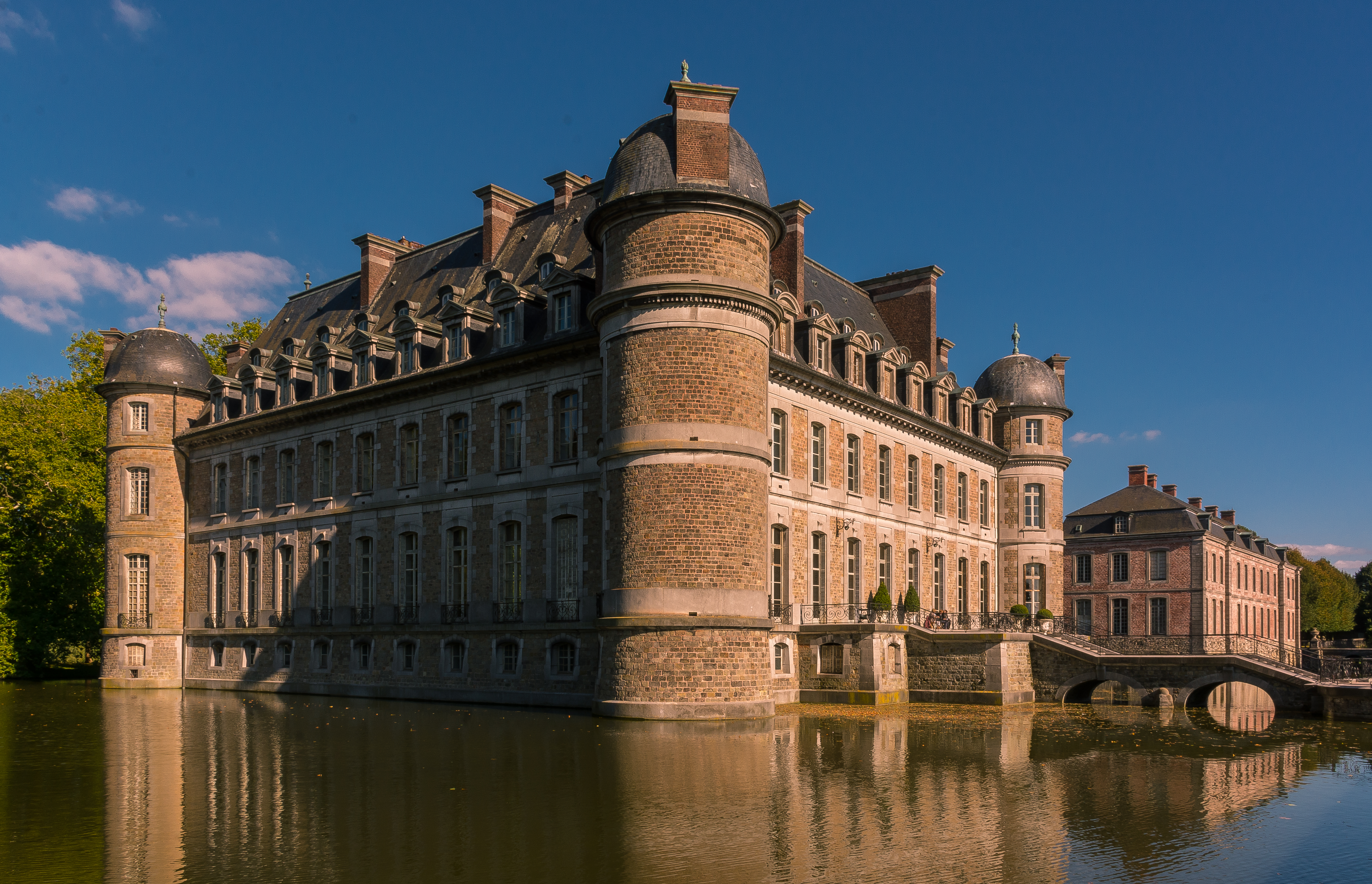
Beloeil Castle

Claude Lamoral, 3rd Prince of Ligne House of Ligne Born: 8 October 1618 Died: 21 December 1679
Regnal titles
Preceded by Albert Henri	Prince of Ligne; 1641–1679	Succeeded by Henri
Government offices
Preceded by 8th Duke of Alburquerque	Viceroy of Sicily; 1670–1674	Succeeded by Francisco Bazán de Benavides
Preceded by 5th Duke de Osuna	Governor of the Duchy of Milan; 1674–1678	Succeeded by 7th Duke of Medina de Rioseco
