= Losacino =

Coordinates: 41°41′N 6°05′W

Losacino, Spain
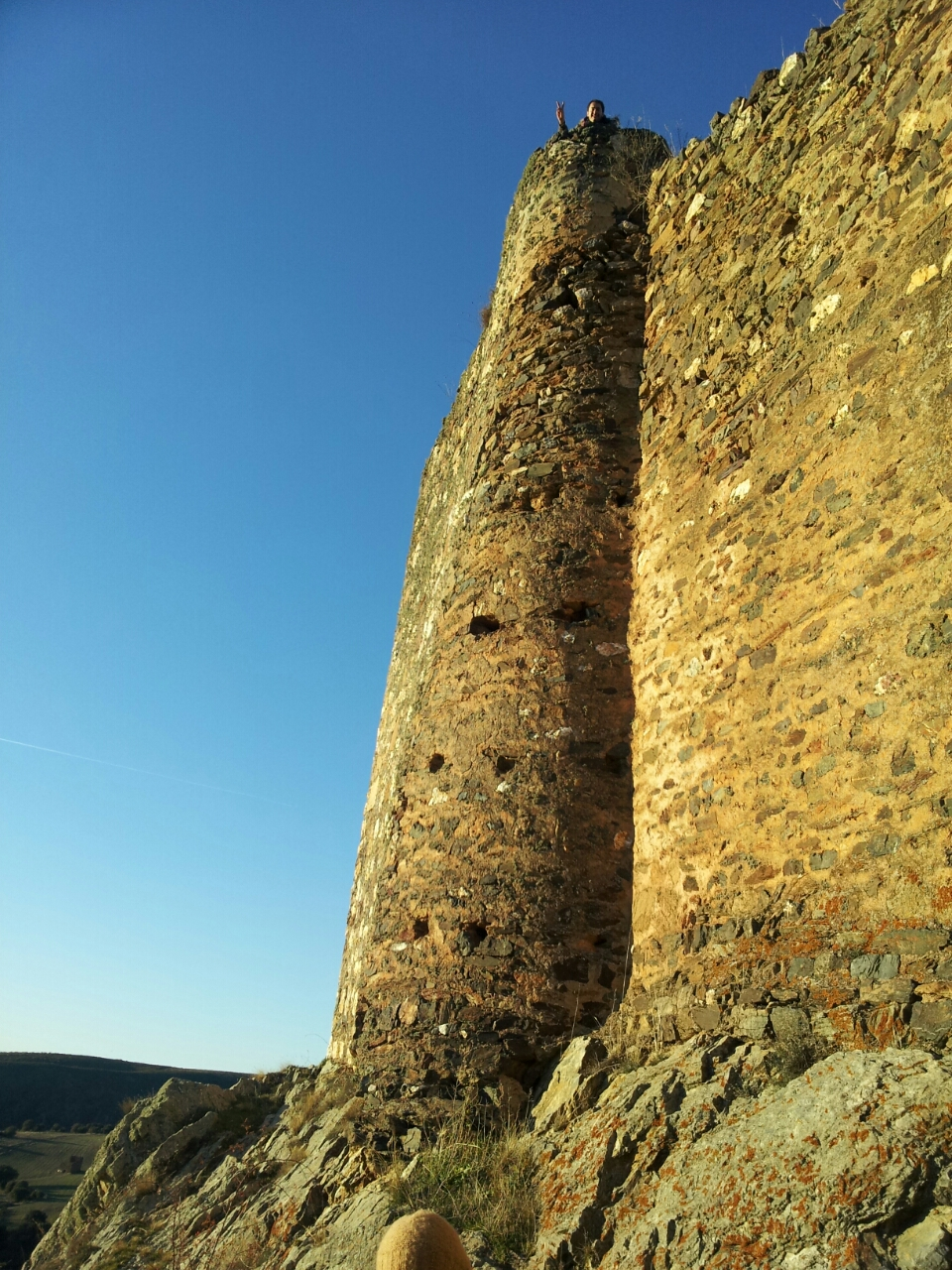
- Interactive map of Losacino, Spain
- Country: Spain
- Autonomous community: Castile and León
- Province: Zamora
- Municipality: Losacino

Area
  - Total: 44 km^{2} (17 sq mi)

Population (2025-01-01)
  - Total: 189
  - Density: 4.3/km^{2} (11/sq mi)
- Time zone: UTC+1 (CET)
  - Summer (DST): UTC+2 (CEST)

Losacino is a municipality located in the province of Zamora, Castile and León, Spain. According to the 2004 census (INE), the municipality has a population of 306 inhabitants.

== Town hall ==
Losacino is home to the town hall of 4 towns:

- Muga de Alba (144 inhabitants, INE 2020).
- Losacino (43 inhabitants, INE 2020).
- Vide de Alba (20 inhabitants, INE 2020).
- Castillo de Alba (3 inhabitants, INE 2020).
