= List of viceroys of Sicily =

Coat of arms of the Aragonese kings of Sicily.

The Viceroys of Sicily (Italian: Viceré di Sicilia) were the regents of the government of the Kingdom of Sicily in place of the Spanish Kings who acquired the title of King of Sicily from 1412 to 1759. In 1806 Ferdinand I of the Two Sicilies, having established himself on the island, abolished the office and established in its place those of lieutenant and captain general.

== Under the Crown of Aragon, 1409–1707 ==
- John of Aragon, Duke of Peñafiel, later king John II of Aragon, 1458–1479, acted 1409–1416.
- Domingo Ram y Lanaja, Bishop of Lleida 1416–1419
- Antonio de Cardona 1419–1421 (1st term)
- Giovanni de Podio 1421–1422
- Niccolò Speciale 1423–1424 (1st term)
- Peter, infans of Aragón 1424–1425
- Giovanni I Ventimiglia, Count-Marquess of Geraci 1430–1432
- Niccolò Speciale 1425–1431 (2nd term subordinately at Peter of Aragon and Giovanni Ventimiglia)
- Pedro Felice and Adamo Asmundo 1432–1433
- direct rule of King Alfonso V 1433–1435
- Ruggero Paruta 1435–1439
- Bernat de Requesens 1439–1440 (1st term)
- Gilabert de Centelles y de Cabrera 1440–1441
- Raimundo Perellós 1441–1443
- Lope Ximénez de Urrea y de Bardaixi 1443–1459 (1st term)
- Juan de Moncayo 1459–1463
- Bernat de Requesens 1463–1465 (2nd term)
- Lope Ximénez de Urrea y de Bardaixi 1465–1475 (2nd term)
- Guillm Pujades 1475–1477
- Joan Ramon Folc III de Cardona, Count of Prades 1477–1479
- Gaspar de Espés, Viceroy of Sicily 1479–1489, Count of Sclafana,(Sicily), Lord of Albalate de Cinca (Spain).
- Fernando de Acuña y de Herrera 1489–1495
- Juan de Lanuza y Garabito 1495-1498
- Juan de Lanuza y Pimentel 1498–1507. Died in Naples, Italy, 1507.
- Ramon de Cardona, Count of Albento 1507–1509
- Hug de Montcada 1509–1517
- Ettore Pignatelli e Caraffa, 1st Duke of Monteleone, Duke of Monteleone 1517–1534
- Simone Ventimiglia, Marquis of Geraci 1534–1535 Interim
- Ferrante Gonzaga, Prince of Molfetta 1535–1546
- Ambrogio Santapace, Marquis of Licodia 1546–1547 Interim
- Juan de Vega, Lord of Grajal 1547–1557
- Juan de la Cerda, 4th Duke of Medinaceli 1557–1564
- García Álvarez de Toledo, 4th Marquis of Villafranca 1564–1566
- Carlo d'Aragona Tagliavia 1566–1568 Interim (1st term)
- Francesco Ferdinando II d'Avalos, 5th Marquis of Pescara, 1568–1571
- Giuseppe Francesco Landriano, Count of Landriano 1571 Interim
- Carlo d'Aragona Tagliavia, 1571–1577 Interim (2nd term)
- Marcantonio Colonna, Prince of Paliano 1577–1584
- Juan Alfonso Bisbal, Count of Briático 1584–1585 Interim
- Diego Enríquez de Guzmán, Count of Alba de Liste 1585–1592
- Enrique de Guzmán, 2nd Count of Olivares 1592–1595
- Giovanni III Ventimiglia, 8th Marquess of Geraci, and Prince of Castelbuono, 1595–1598 Interim (1st term)
- Bernardino de Cárdenas y Portugal, Duke of Maqueda 1598–1601
- Jorge de Cárdenas y Manrique de Lara, Marquis of Elche 1601–1602 Interim
- Lorenzo Suárez de Figueroa y Córdoba, Duke of Feria 1602–1606
- Giovanni III Ventimiglia, 8th Marquess of Geraci and Prince of Castelbuono, 1606–1607 Interim (2nd term)
- Juan Fernandez Pacheco, 5th Duke of Escalona 1607–1610
- Giovanni Doria, Cardinal 1610–1611 Interim (1st term)
- Pedro Téllez-Girón, 3rd Duke of Osuna 1611–1616
- Francisco Ruiz de Castro 1616–1622
- Emanuel Filibert of Savoy 1622–1624
- Giovanni Doria, Cardinal 1624–1626 (2nd term)
- Antonio Pimentel y Toledo, Marquis of Tavora 1626–1627
- Enrique Pimentel, Count of Villalba, 1627
- Francisco de la Cueva, 7th Duke of Alburquerque 1627–1632
- Fernando Afán de Ribera y Enríquez, Duke of Alcalá 1632–1635
- Luis de Moncada, 7th Duke of Montalto, 1635–1639 Interim
- Francisco de Melo, Marquis of Villanueva, 1639–1641
- Juan Alfonso Enríquez de Cabrera 1641–1644
- Pedro Fajardo Requesens y Zúñiga, Marquis of los Vélez 1644–1647
- Vicente de Guzmán, Marquis of Montealegre 1647 Interim
- Gian Giacomo Teodoro Trivulzio, Cardinal 1647–1649
- John of Austria the Younger 1649–1651
- Rodrigo de Sandoval y Mendoza, 7th Duke of Infantado 1651–1655
- Juan Tellez-Girón y Enriquez de Ribera, 4th Duke of Osuna 1655–1656
- Martín de Redín 1656–1657
- Pedro Rubeo 1657–1660 Interim
- Fernando de Ayala, Count of Ayala 1660–1663
- Francesco Caetani, 8th Duke of Sermoneta, 1663–1667
- Francisco Fernández de la Cueva, 8th Duke of Alburquerque 1667–1670
- Claude Lamoral, Prince of Ligne 1670–1674
- Francisco Bazán de Benavides 1674 Interim
- Fadrique de Toledo y Osorio, Marquis of Villafranca del Bierzo 1674–1676
- Anielo de Guzmán, Marquis jure uxoris of Castel Rodrigo 1676–77
- Eleanor de Moura, Marquise of Castel Rodrigo 1677 Interim
- Luis Manuel Fernández de Portocarrero, Cardinal 1677–1678 Interim
- Vicente de Gonzaga y Doria 1678
- Francisco de Benavides, Count of Santisteban 1678–1687
- Juan Francisco Pacheco y Téllez-Girón, 4th Consort Duke of Uceda 1687–1696
- Pedro Manuel Colón de Portugal y de la Cueva, 1696–1701, 7th Duke of Veragua from 1673 to 1710 .
- Juan Manuel Fernández Pacheco, 8th Marquis of Villena, Duke of Escalona 1701–1702
- Francesco Del Giudice, Cardinal 1702–1705 Interim
- Isidoro de la Cueva y Benavides, Marquis of Bedmar 1705–1707

== Under the Kingdom of Spain, 1707–1713 ==
- 1707–1713: Carlo Antonio Spinola, 4th Marquess of the Balbases

At the end of the War of the Spanish Succession, by the Treaty of Utrecht (1713), Sicily was ceded to Victor Amadeus II, Duke of Savoy.

== Under the House of Savoy, 1713–1720 ==
- 1714–1718: Annibale Maffei, Count
- 1718–1719: Giovan Francesco di Bette, Marquis of Lede
- 1719–1720: Niccolò Pignatelli, Duke of Monteleone

The Spanish invaded the kingdom in 1718 during the War of the Quadruple Alliance. The Duke of Savoy ceded it to Austria in 1720 by the Treaty of The Hague.

== Under the Habsburg monarchy, 1720–1734 ==
- 1722–1728: Joaquín Fernández de Portocarrero, Marquis of Almenara
- 1728–1734: Cristoforo Fernandez de Cordoba, Count of Sastago

Conquered by the Spanish in 1734 during the War of the Polish Succession, the kingdom was ceded to Charles I, Duke of Parma, a son of King Philip V of Spain.

== Under the House of Bourbon, 1734–1816 ==
- 1734–1737: José Carrillo de Albornoz, 1st Duke of Montemar
- 1737–1747: Bartolomeo Corsini, Prince of Sismano
- 1747–1754: Jacques-Eustache de La Viefville, Duke of La Viefville
- 1755–1775: Giovanni Fogliani Sforza d'Aragona, Marquis of Pellegrino
- 1775–1781: Marcantonio Colonna, Prince of Stigliano
- 1781–1786: Domenico Caracciolo, Marquis of Villamaina
- 1786–1795: Francesco d'Aquino, Prince of Caramanico
- 1795–1798: Francisco Lopez y Rojo, Archbishop of Palermo
- 1798–1802: Tommaso Firrao di Luzzi, Prince of Sant'Agata
- 1802–1803: Cardinal Domenico Pignatelli di Belmonte, Archbishop of Palermo
- 1803–1806: Alessandro Filangieri, Prince of Cutò
- 1806–1813: direct rule of King Ferdinand III
- 1813–1816: Lieutenant-General: Francis, Duke of Calabria
- 1816: Lieutenant-General: Niccolò Filangieri, Prince of Cutò

In 1816 the Kingdom of Naples and the Kingdom of Sicily were merged into the new Kingdom of the Two Sicilies.
