= Francisco Fernández de la Cueva, 8th Duke of Alburquerque =

Mexican politician (1619–1676)

The Most Excellent The Duke of Alburquerque GE KOS
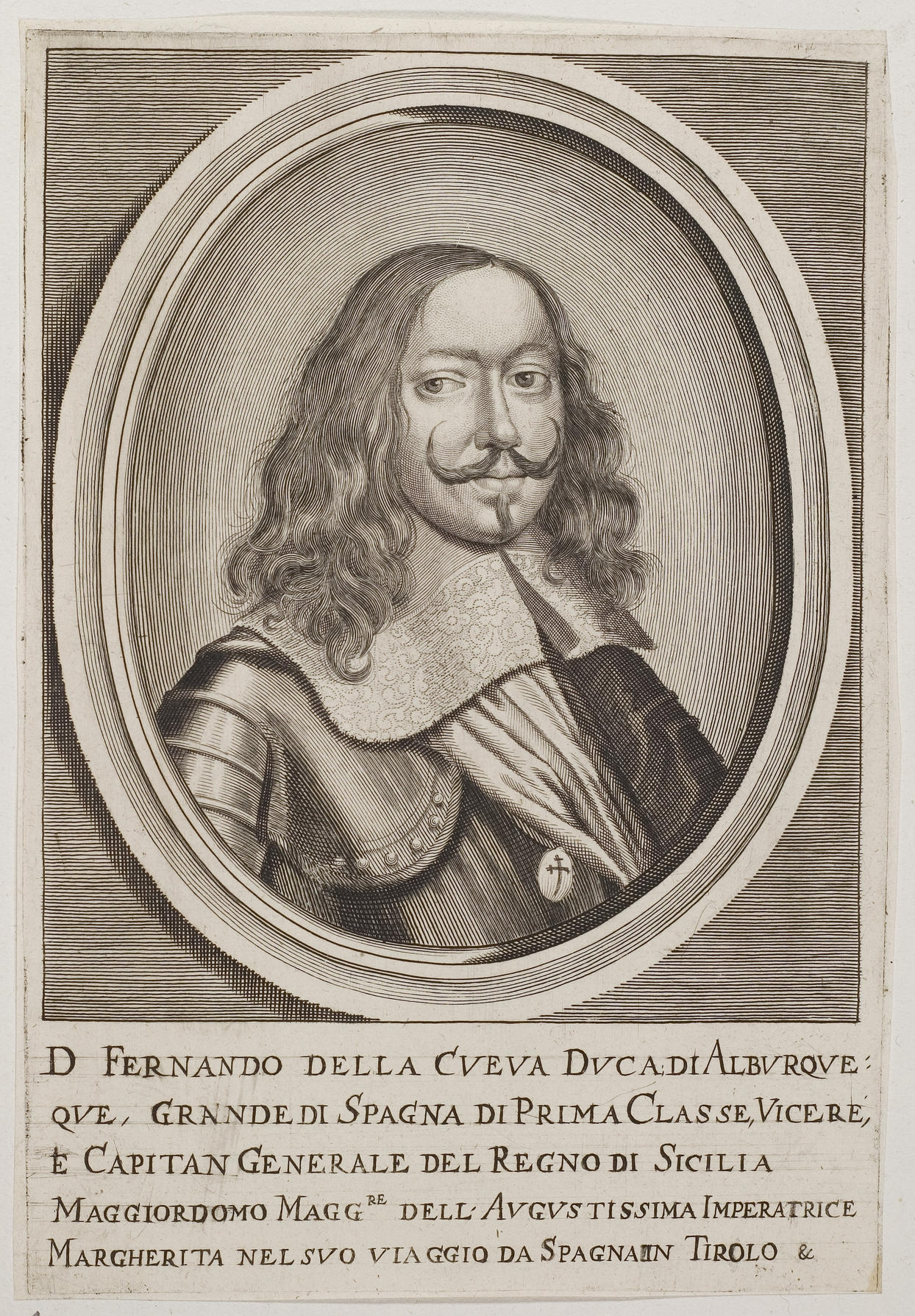

Viceroy of Sicily
- In office 1668–1670
- Monarch: Charles II
- Preceded by: Francesco Caetani
- Succeeded by: Claude Lamoral, Prince of Ligne

22nd Viceroy of New Spain
- In office August 15, 1653 – September 15, 1660
- Monarch: Philip IV
- Valido: Luis de Haro
- Preceded by: Luis Enríquez de Guzmán, conde de Alba de Liste
- Succeeded by: Juan de Leyva de la Cerda, conde de Baños

Personal details
- Born: c. 1619 Barcelona, Spain
- Died: March 27, 1676 (aged 56–57) Madrid, Spain
- Spouse: Juana de Armendáriz

Francisco Fernández de la Cueva y Enriquez de Cabrera, 8th Duke of Alburquerque, 6th Marquess of Cuéllar, 8th Count of Ledesma, GE, KOS (1619 – March 27, 1676) was a Spanish military officer and viceroy of New Spain from August 15, 1653 to September 15, 1660. He was also viceroy of Sicily from 1668 to 1670.

== Early life ==
Don Francisco Fernández de la Cueva was born in Barcelona into one of the most aristocratic families of Spain, as the eldest surviving son from the third marriage of his father, Francisco Fernández de la Cueva, 7th Duke of Alburquerque (1575–1637). His father was "one of the toughest, most rigorous, and successful of the viceroys of Catalonia...and had specialized in the [sic] suppression of disorder." His father's first marriage to Doña Antonia, from the powerful House "de Toledo-Beaumont", was childless. He married again with Ana María de Padilla who deceased before 1614. Their only son, Beltran, died at age 17 in December 1617. In his 3rd marriage, the Duke married Ana Enríquez de Cabrera y Colonna and had 9 children; his wife survived him some 21 years.

Francisco, the eldest son, entered military service when very young. He served in the cavalry in Flanders. He took part in the Battle of Rocroi during the Franco-Spanish War in 1643. Later, as general of cavalry, he fought in the defense of Tortosa and in the siege of Barcelona in 1651. One feature of his career would be also his Ambassadorial activities in the Germanic countries.

== Viceroy of New Spain ==
He made his formal entry into Mexico City in New Spain to take up the reins of government on August 15, 1653. He was accompanied by his wife, Juana de Armendáriz, the daughter of Lope Díez de Armendáriz, a previous viceroy of New Spain.

Because of the war with England, he feared an invasion of Spanish territories in the New World. Because of this he strengthened the defenses of Veracruz and San Juan de Ulúa on the east coast of New Spain. He also sent arms and munitions to Jamaica, Cuba and Florida.

He increased trade with the Philippines, Siam and Cochinchina, sending mercury, saltpeter and other mineral products. He ordered the resumption of the minting of gold coins (suspended by Viceroy Antonio de Mendoza). He collected the royal rents with care, and sent back to Spain large quantities of silver. He reinforced the Armada de Barlovento, which guarded the coast and shipping. He ordered the construction in Campeche of new ships for the coastal and overseas trade. He also repaired the aqueduct supplying Mexico City with water.

The viceroy accelerated the construction of the new cathedral of Mexico City, visiting it every afternoon, climbing the scaffolding, and giving monetary rewards to the workers. During a visit to the cathedral on 12 March 1660, a 19-year-old soldier in the viceroy's guard, Manuel Ledesma y Robles of Madrid, attacked the viceroy with a sword. The viceroy survived. Justice was swift for his attacker, who was quickly tried, then dragged around the city and back to the Plaza Mayor, where he was hanged the next day.

The city of Alburquerque (now spelled Albuquerque), in what is now New Mexico, was founded on February 7, 1706 (not 1660) under his son's direction. He granted land to more than 100 Spanish families there.

The writers of this period attributed to his government a strong encouragement for the development of the sciences and the arts. His palace was considered a model of elegance and good taste.

== Later life ==
He left New Spain for Madrid in September, 1660. Thereafter he was named lieutenant general of marines. He also served as ambassador extraordinary to Vienna to accompany Infanta Margaret Theresa of Spain, daughter of King Philip IV of Spain, when she married her uncle, Leopold I, Holy Roman Emperor. In 1668 Fernández de la Cueva was named viceroy of Sicily, where he remained two years. In 1674 the King appointed him as his Mayordomo mayor, chief of his Household.

He died in March, 1676 in the Royal Palace of Madrid.

== Marriage and children ==
Francisco Fernández de la Cueva married in 1645 Juana Francisca de Díez de Aux Armendáriz, daughter of Lope Díez de Armendáriz, 1st Marquess of Cadreita, and had only 1 daughter.

This daughter, Ana de la Cueva y Díez de Aux Armendáriz (1647–1716), was married to her father's younger brother Melchor, thus making him 9th Duke of Alburquerque after Francisco's death.

Government offices
Preceded by Francesco Caetani	Viceroy of Sicily; 1668–1670	Succeeded by The Prince of Ligne
Preceded by Luis Enríquez de Guzmán, 9th Count of Alba de Liste	Viceroy of New Spain; 1653–1660	Succeeded by Juan de Leyva de la Cerda, conde de Baños
Spanish nobility
Preceded by Francisco Fernández de la Cueva, 7th Duke of Alburquerque	Duke of Alburquerque; 1637–1676	Succeeded by Melchor Fernández de la Cueva, 9th Duke of Alburquerque
