= Gilabert de Centelles y de Cabrera =

Gilabert de Centelles y de Cabrera (born c.1400) was a Viceroy of Sicily and the son of Gilabert de Centelles y de Riusech, Baron of Nules, and Elionor de Cabrera.

Coat of arms of the Centelles family

The Centelles were a notable and wealthy family from Valencia. He married Constanza di Ventimiglia, Countess of Collesano in Sicily.
