= Villaflor, Ávila =

Villaflor
- municipality
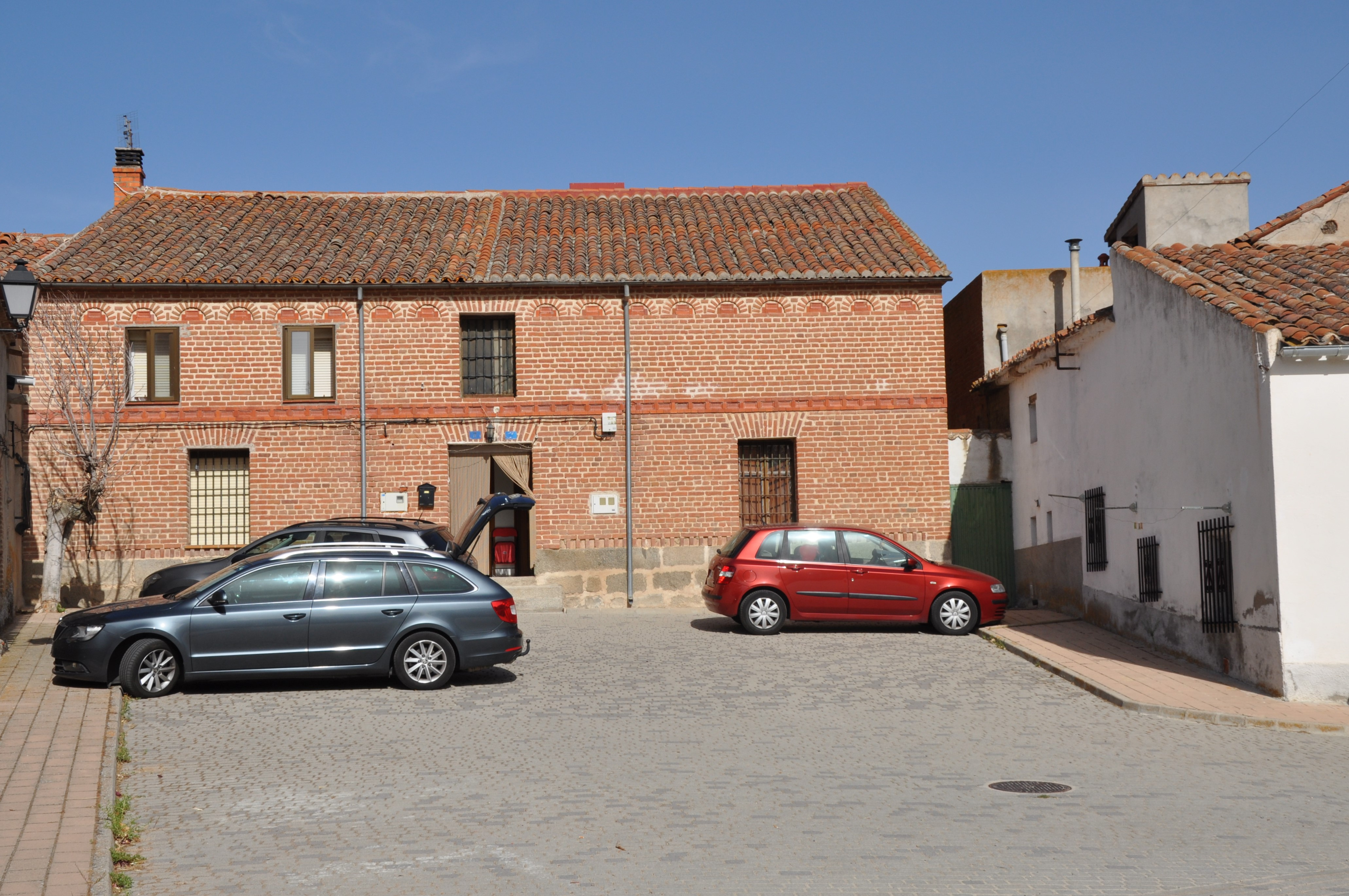
- Villaflor house

- Flag Coat of arms

- Location in Spain. Villaflor (Spain)
- Coordinates: 40°45′30″N 4°52′27″W
- Country: Spain
- Autonomous community: Castile and León
- Province: Ávila
- Municipality: Villaflor

Area
  - Total: 18 km^{2} (6.9 sq mi)

Population (2025-01-01)
  - Total: 100
  - Density: 5.6/km^{2} (14/sq mi)
- Time zone: UTC+1 (CET)
  - Summer (DST): UTC+2 (CEST)
- Website: Official website

Villaflor is a municipality located in the province of Ávila, Castile and León, Spain.

== Population ==
Historical population
Year	Pop.	±% p.a.
2023	102	—
2024	99	−2.94%
2025	100	+1.01%
Source: INE
