= Francisco Goya's tapestry cartoons =

Painting series by Francisco de Goya

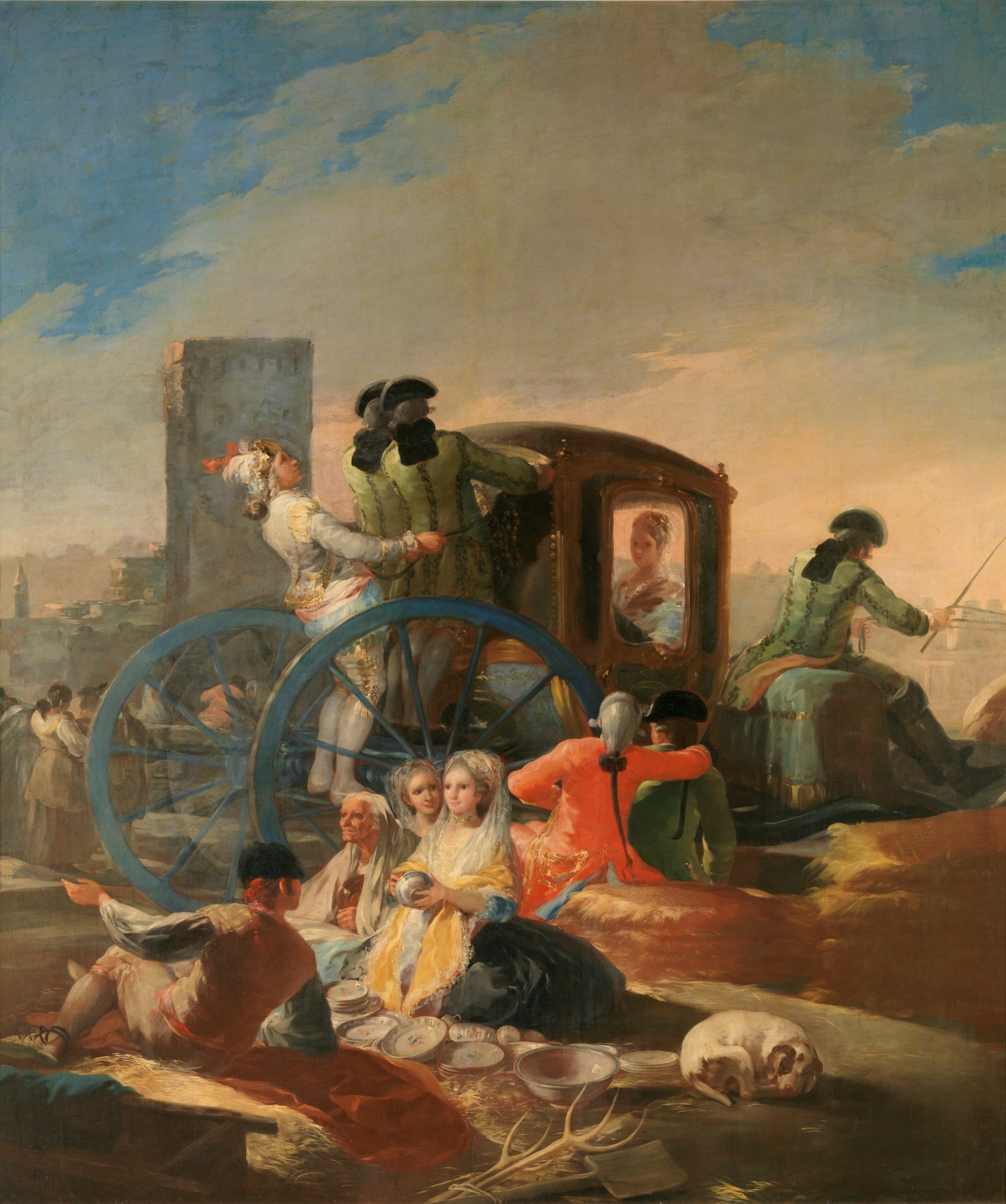
The Pottery Vendor.

Francisco Goya produced a group of tapestry cartoons between 1775 and 1792 as designs for the Royal Tapestry Factory of Santa Barbara near Madrid in Spain. Although they are not the only tapestry cartoons made at the Royal Factory (other painters of this factory were Mariano Salvador Maella, Antonio González Velázquez, José Camarón and José del Castillo), they are much the best known. Most of them represent bucolic, hunting, rural and popular themes. They strictly adhered to the tastes of King Charles III and the princes Charles of Bourbon and Maria Luisa of Parma, and were supervised by other artists of the factory such as Maella and the Bayeu family. Most are now in the Museo del Prado, having remained in the Spanish Royal collection, although there are some in art galleries in other countries.

After a fruitful career in his native Aragon, the renowned court painter Francisco Bayeu got his brother-in-law to go to Madrid to work on the decorative works for the royal palaces. By then, Anton Raphael Mengs was the most prominent artist at the court after Tiepolo's death in 1770. It was this employment at the court that most satisfied the ambition of Goya, and which would eventually make him the most fashionable artist for the wealthy class of Madrid. Between 1780 and 1786 he left this commission to spend his time as an artist in other private activities.

The tapestry cartoons are structured in seven series, each with a different number of works and subject matter. A common feature in all of them is the presence of rural themes and popular entertainment. Only the first one shows themes related to hunting. Once finished, the cartoons were woven into tapestry and placed in the piece for which they were intended in the royal palaces.

In 1858 they went to the basement of the Royal Palace of Madrid, where some were stolen in 1870. That year Gregorio Cruzada undertook the task of cataloging them and showing them to the public in the museum. They appeared for the first time in the official catalog of the institution in 1876. However, some small modellos (painted by Goya for the approval of the subjects) were in the hands of the Dukes of Osuna, whose descendants auctioned them in 1896. At that auction some paintings were bought by the Prado and others by collectors such as Pedro Fernández Durán and José Lázaro Galdiano, remaining in Spain.

Goya was able to grow as an artist and raise his social status through these pieces, which made him a sought-after painter in high circles in Madrid. In 1789 he obtained the position of Pintor de Cámara de Carlos IV —the former Prince— and years before he was admitted to the Academia de San Fernando.

== Context ==
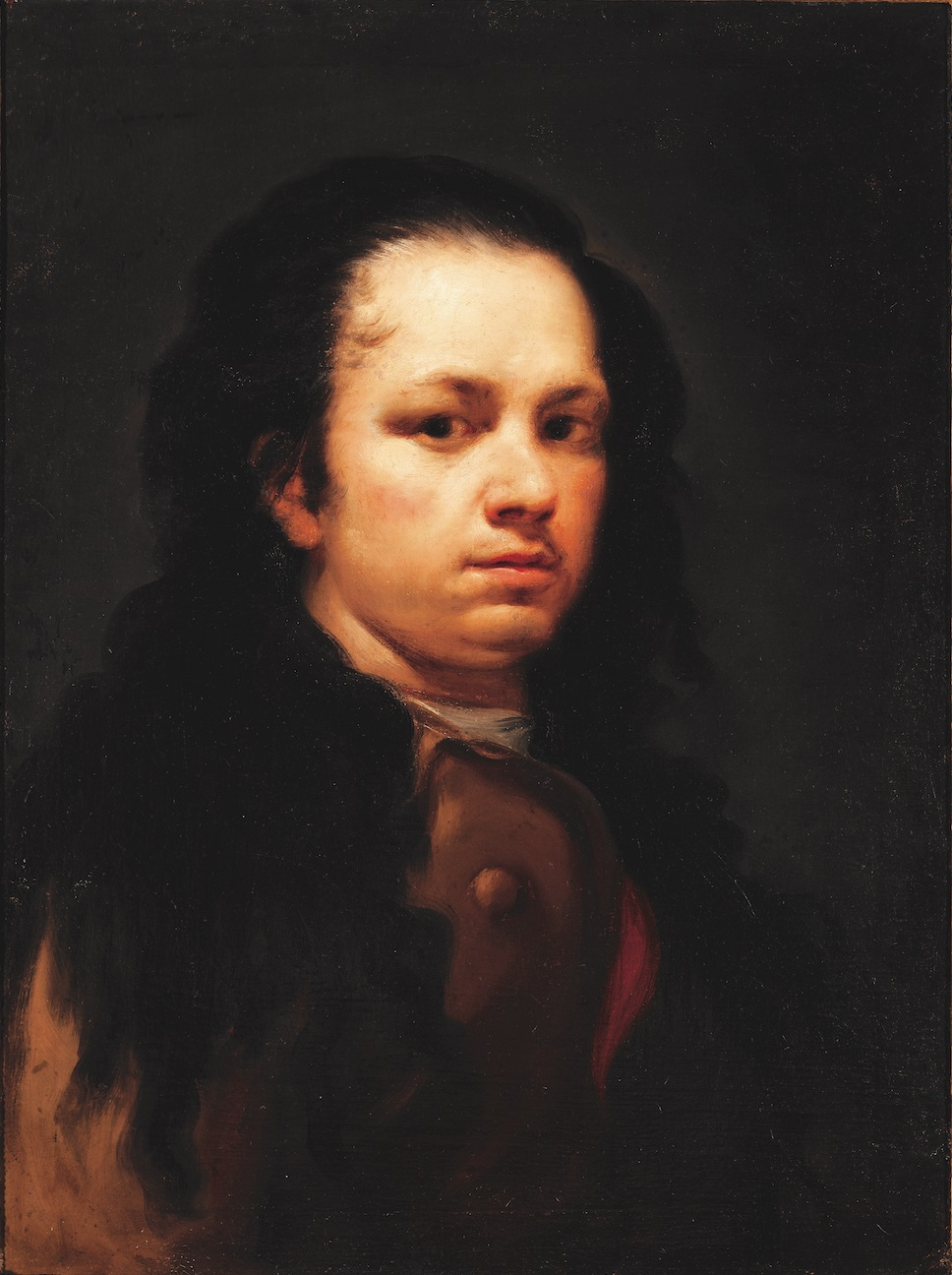
Self-portrait by Goya around 1773, shortly before he began his first series of cartoons.

The year was 1774 and Goya was twenty-eight years old when his father, Javier Nieto, died recently. Born in Fuendetodos, a town near the Aragonese capital, one of his greatest ambitions was to settle in Madrid, the capital of the kingdom, a city that was modernizing by leaps and bounds due to the efforts of the Bourbons, a dynasty that, despite having been in power for only 70 years, had already consolidated itself completely.

Twice Goya has tried to be admitted to the Royal Academy of Fine Arts of San Fernando, but on both occasions the paintings he attached to his application were rejected. But the painter was able to travel to Italy, the great cultural center of the time. It was then that he painted his first great historical painting: Hannibal Seeing Italy from the Alps. However, he did not do well in the competition and decided to return to his homeland, where he undertook the famous paintings of the Cartuja del Aula Dei.

Goya marries Josefa, sister of the wealthy Bayeu painters. Some time later his brother-in-law Francisco was able to obtain a position at the court for the novice provincial painter, perhaps following orders from Mengs.

Tomlinson notes that between April and December 1774, Goya was decorating the Charterhouse of Aula Dei, so he did not join the group of painters in Madrid until well into 1775. Rapelli categorically rejects this theory, stating that the Aragonese settled in the Spanish capital in December 1774.

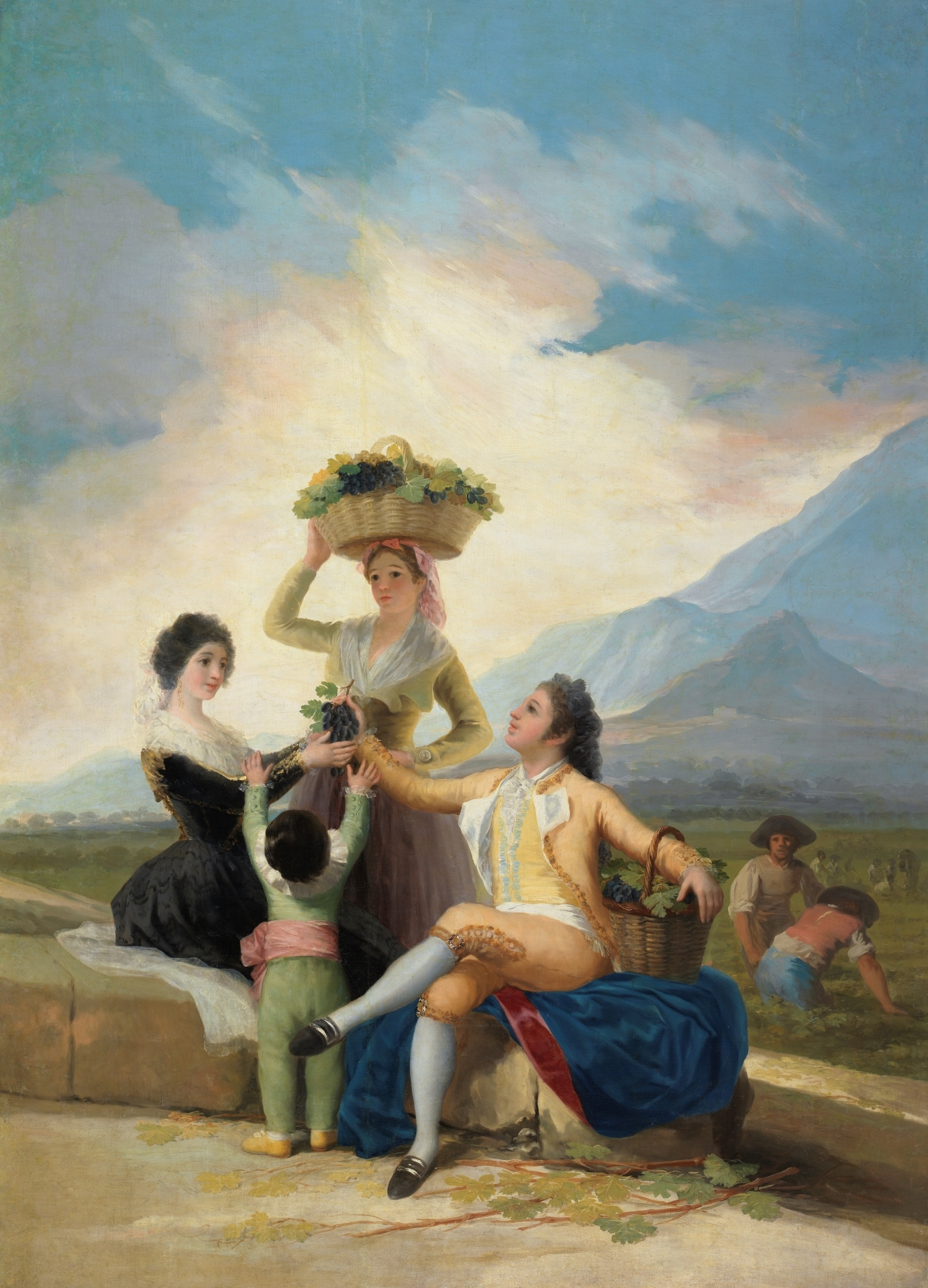
The Grape Harvest.

In the capital city, Madrid, Goya worked alongside an extremely large court of artisans and painters. The Royal Tapestry Factory of Santa Barbara was the center of artistic activity. The bohemian Mengs sometimes directed Goya's work, as did the first architect of the court, Francisco Sabatini. Occasionally Bayeu himself and Mariano Salvador Maella, another notable cartoon painter, would take on this role.

Until 1780 he painted four series of cartoons, but that year the economic crisis forced the suspension of the supply of cartoons for the royal estancias. Then Goya decided to give his career another turn. Perhaps the desire —fueled, no doubt, by the study of his life and work — to emulate Diego Velázquez, leads him to make his way as a private painter. He returns to his homeland in Aragon and paints the dome and pendentives of the Regina Martyrum of El Pilar, which will bring him into conflict with his brother-in-law Francisco and the town council of Zaragoza. In Madrid he worked as a portrait painter for high society, especially for the Dukes of Osuna. He also managed to paint for the church of Saint Francis the Great the painting Saint Bernardine of Siena Preaching before Alfonso V of Aragón and to enter the Academy of San Fernando with his best known religious work, Christ Crucified, a magnificent fusion of Velazquez's style with that of Mengs. Shortly thereafter he met the infante Luis de Borbón, brother of the king and exiled from the court as a result of his morganatic marriage. The prince became his patron and introduced him to aristocratic circles. It is very likely that Goya decided to return as a tapestry painter after the death of his protector in 1785.

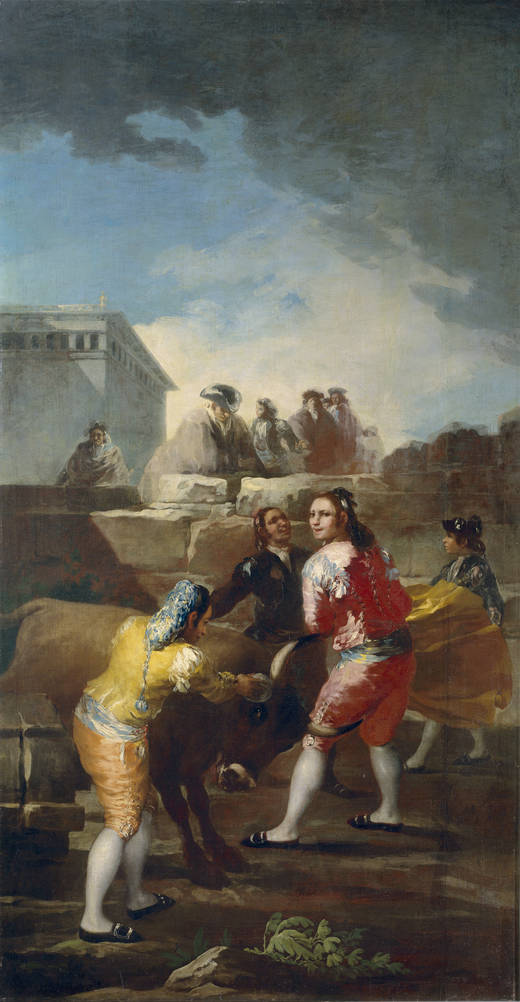
La novillada

In 1786 Goya returned to the factory and painted cartoons that already denoted verism (The Snowstorm and The Wounded Mason). In the last series he painted, elements were foreshadowed —the groom with a simian face in The Wedding— that the Aragonese painter would later depict in his Caprichos.

Six years later, in 1792, Goya suffered an illness that would be the turning point of his career. He would never return to his former work as a cartoon painter, and now undertook works of a more personal nature. However, he will paint other works for the court, such as Charles IV of Spain and His Family.

Hagen evidence Goya's rise from a simple provincial painter to a full-fledged court artist. In 1786 Goya acquires his first carriage and is already a sought-after painter. He describes to his friend Zapater a trial trip, from which it is inferred that he enjoys an excellent economic situation since he belongs to the Academy of San Fernando and is about to become the King's Painter.

José Gudiol, one of the first experts in the work of the master of Fuendetodos, affirms that in Goya the indelible imprint of the courtly world and the grace of the popular world, which always alternated in the painter's mind, are mixed.

Jeannine Baticle, another of Goya's great scholars, points out that Goya becomes "the faithful heir of the great Spanish pictorial tradition. In him, shadow and light create powerful volumes built in the impasto, clarified with brief luminous strokes in which the subtlety of the colors produces infinite variations".

=== Spain at the time ===
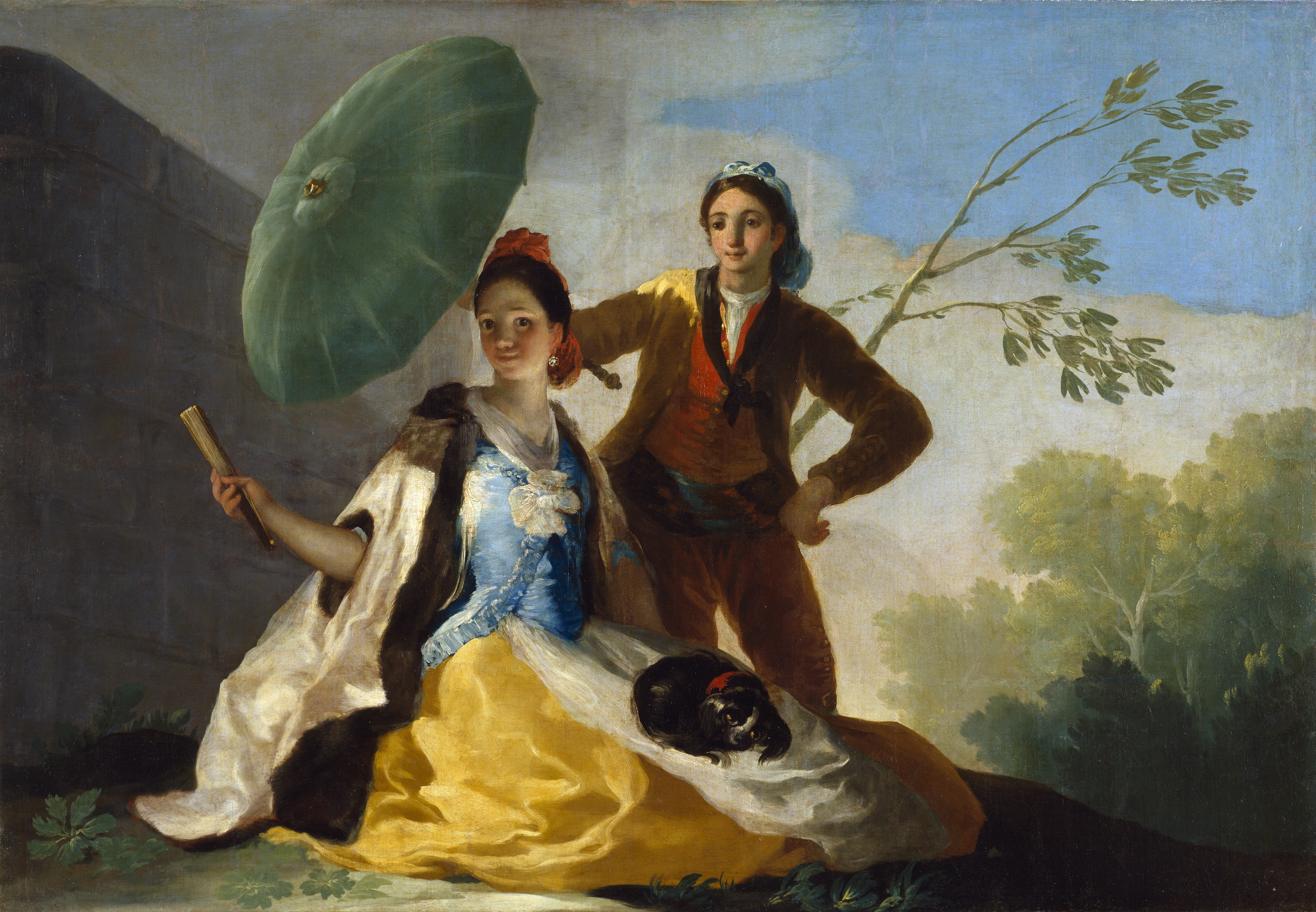
The Parasol.

The death without descendants of the last Spanish Austria, Charles II, caused a long war between the European powers that culminated with the recognition of Philip of Anjou as king of Spain under the name of Philip V. This, grandson of the Sun King, introduced French fashion in Spain, and brought Gallic artists such as Hyacinthe Rigaud and Louis-Michel Van Loo to work in the Peninsula.

From the 1730s onwards, the presence of Italians at the Madrid court became more notorious, due to the fact that Philip V's second wife, the Parmesan Isabella de Farnesio, had a great preference for the culture of the Italic Peninsula. Jacopo Amigoni and Gianbattista Tiepolo would be the most prominent Italians in Spain, but under Charles III the luck would change in favor of the Bohemian Mengs. After the death of the latter, no more foreign painter would be called to Spain, what Tomlinson (1993) calls "nationalization of Spanish painting under Charles III".

It is feasible that this nationalization of art is strongly rooted in the open hostility of the Spanish people towards foreigners, derived from the failure of the Seven Years' War. This whole movement culminated in the Motín de Esquilache, with which the enlightened Spaniards gradually displaced the French. Two examples of this were Aranda and Floridablanca.

In 1782 there was a brief attempt to put the tapestry factory in the hands of Spanish craftsmen. But the king rejected the painters' requests and handed over the management of the workshop to a Fleming named Vandergoten, supposedly a relative of the family that had founded the factory more than six decades earlier.

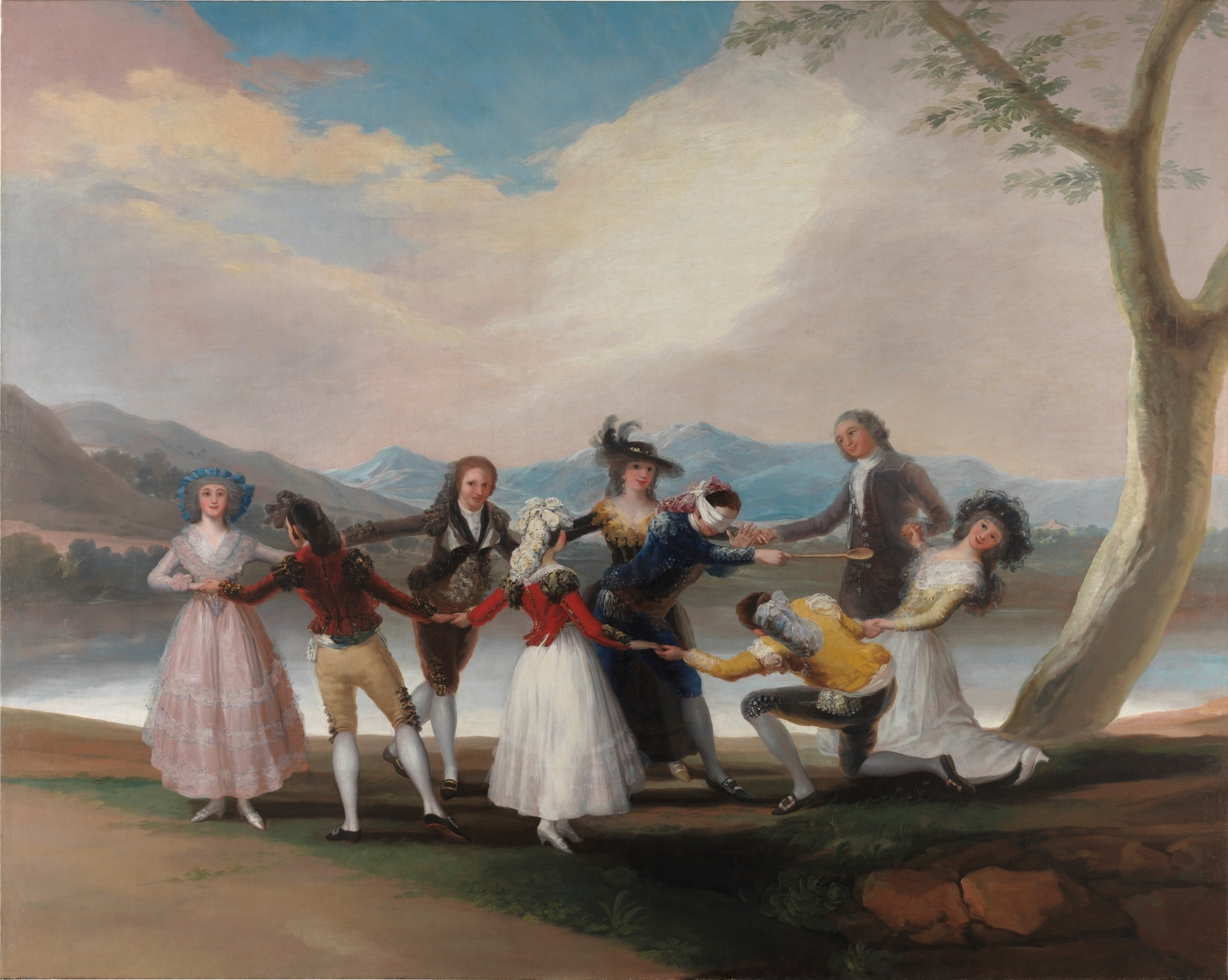
Blind Man's Bluff.

== Dating and attribution ==
The seven series of tapestry cartoons are composed, in total, of between 60 and 73 works. Some authors, such as Rapelli, date the paintings at 63.

Juan Ramón Triadó Tur has established in his monograph on the Prado Museum an exact number of 60 cartoons, although this figure may well refer only to the number of works of this series preserved in the Madrid art gallery.

The three leading specialists in Goya's cartoons, Nigel Glendinning, Valeriano Bozal and Janis Tomlinson, are inclined to date the series between 1775 and 1792. Considering the aforementioned six-year interval, this would result in twelve years of Goya's work at the Royal Tapestry Factory.

The size and motifs of the cartoons were intimately related to their hierarchy and the place assigned to them in the royal room. They can, therefore, be divided into panels —the most extensive compositions, which would occupy the largest space and would delimit the theme of the entire series— and other smaller cartoons destined for over doors or balconies. A letter from Goya to his friend Martín Zapater details a meeting with the sovereign and the princes in 1779, where it is stated that only the sketches for the main scenes were shown. This could explain the serious stylistic discrepancies between the main subjects and the smaller cartoons. Some authors attach great importance to the fact that the series projected in 1787 and 1791–92 were never hung as Goya had agreed.

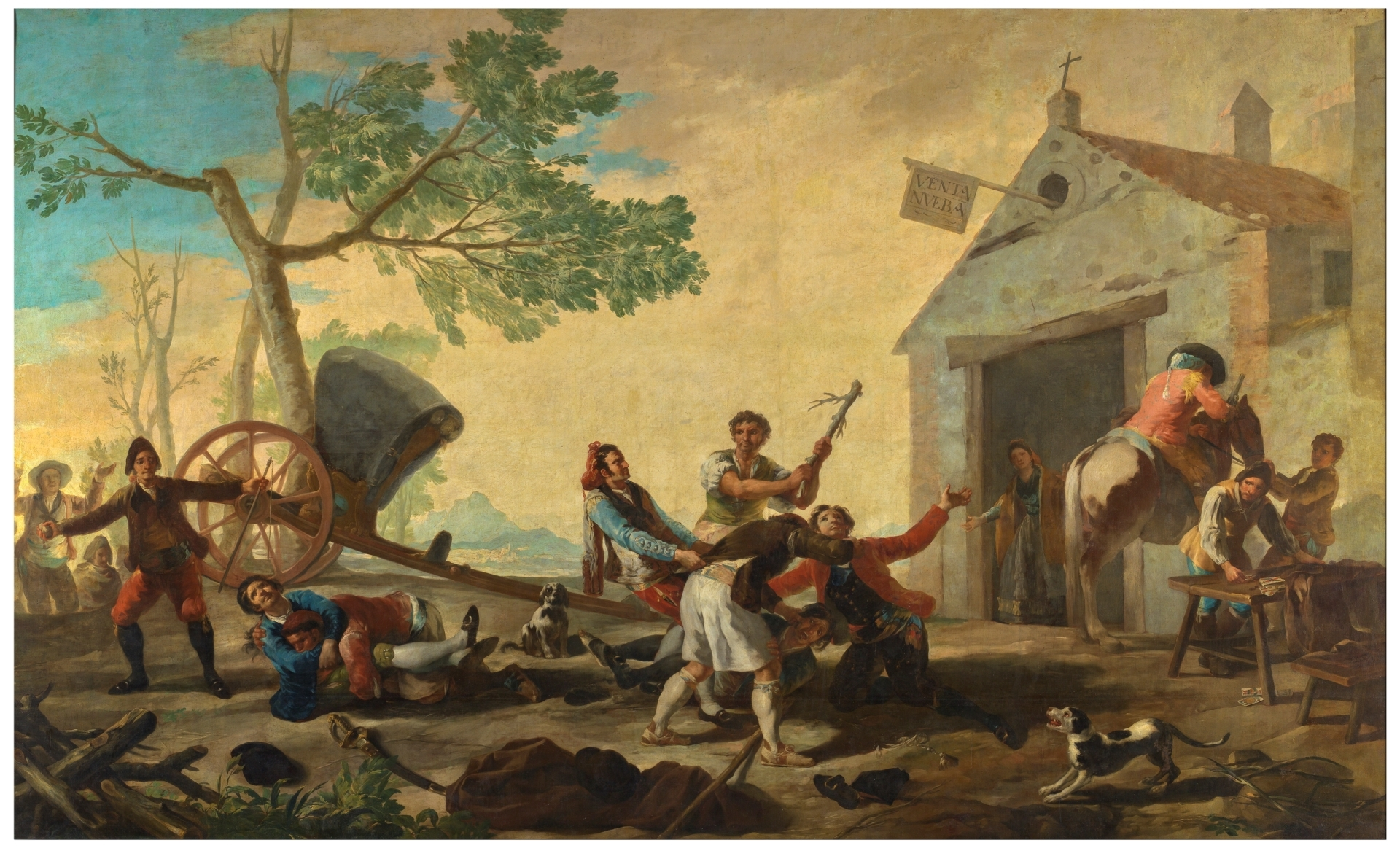
Quarrel in the New Tavern.

The dating of the cartoons has not been the subject of much discussion, since the Royal Factory kept detailed records of the works, which remain to this day. However, there is a serious dating conflict for Blind Man's Bluff. Critics of the stature of Bozal and Glendinning affirm that it was made in 1789, but Tomlinson rejects this theory and proposes that it was completed before 1788, since the series to which it belonged was left unfinished when Charles III died —on December 14, 1788— and in April 1789 Goya received the longed-for appointment as painter of the chamber, so his activity in the field of cartoons would diminish drastically. The small reference guide to Goya's works in the Museo del Prado, written by Manuela de Mena, records Blind Man's Bluff as having been painted between 1788–89.

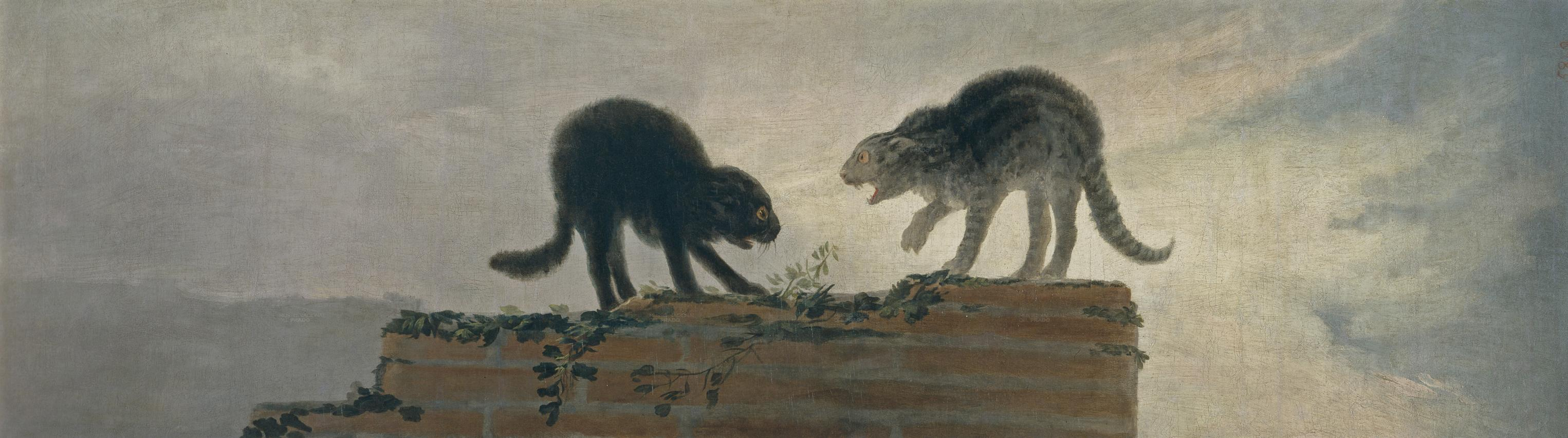
Cats Fighting or Fight of Cats, discovered in 1984.

Nor has it been determined to which series belong The Swing and A Stickball Game. Although most critics prefer the former bedroom, Tomlinson argues that they were painted for the bedroom of the princes in El Pardo. Other paintings that have provoked debate for their location in the series are Boy with a Bird, Boy and a Tree and Majo with Guitar. In this area of dating, it has been complicated to determine whether The See-Saw is a tapestry cartoon, because although Tomlinson decides in the affirmative, another part of the specialized critics refuses to take the attribution as part of the cartoons.

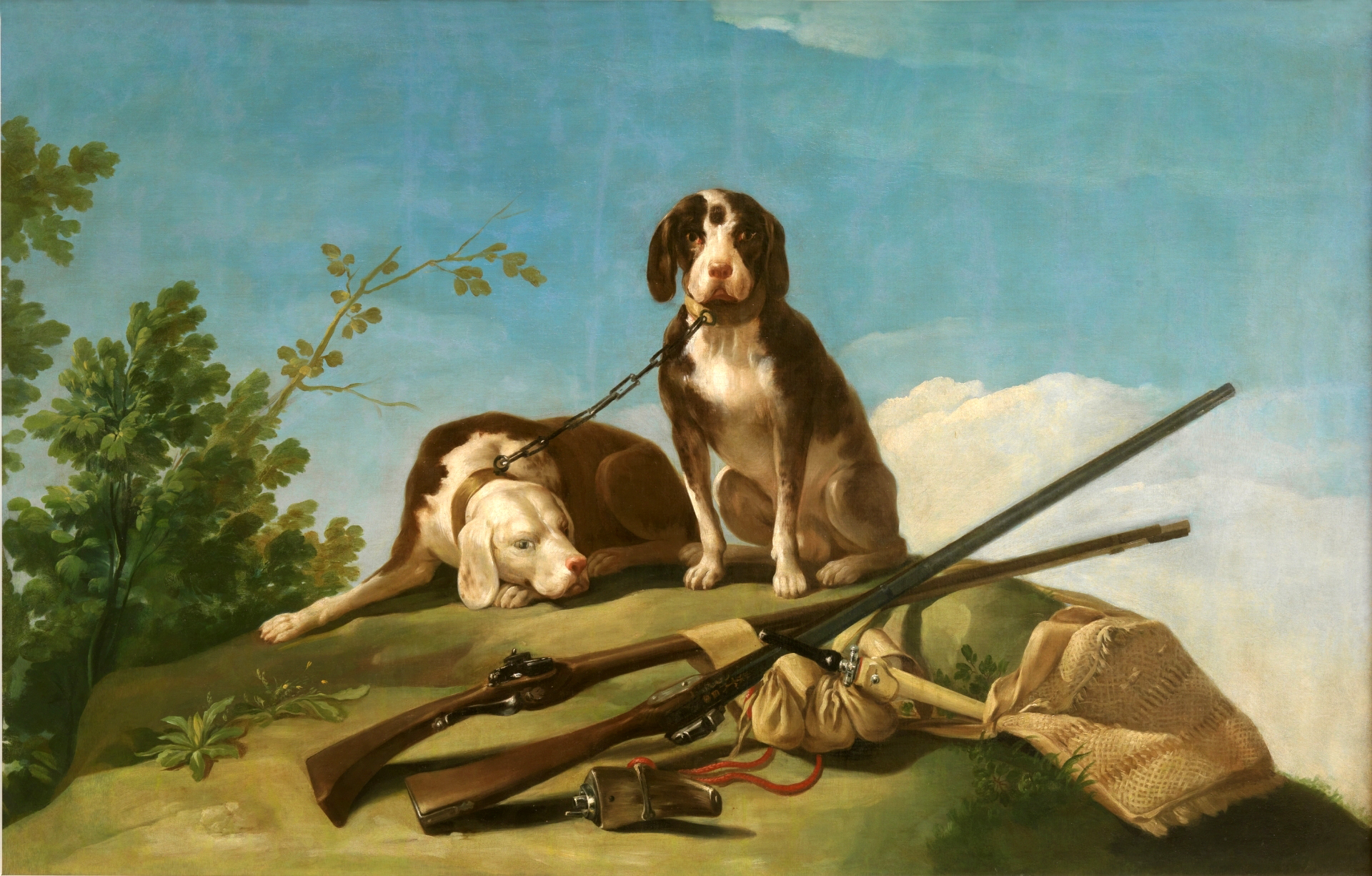
Dogs and Hunting Gear.

As Tomlinson points out, it is beyond doubt that Goya painted the tapestry cartoons. However, there have been some incidents surrounding that issue. The most notorious example has been Cats Fighting, discovered in the basement of the Prado in the 1980s. Since it bears no relation to Goya's other cartoons, especially to the series to which it has traditionally been attributed —the fifth—, it has been seriously doubted that it is the work of the Aragonese. Moreover, it does not have the same stylistic features as other works of the period.

Another of the paintings with doubtful dating is Chicken Fights, which Bozal assumes as part of the seventh series, dedicated to the king's office in El Escorial, as well as the official page of the Prado Museum.

Usually some of the paintings for the alameda of the Dukes of Osuna are taken as part of the cartoons for tapestries, with characteristics and themes extremely similar to those of the cartoons, although with a different technique. The best known case is The Fall, a country scene. Another case to highlight is A Picador, painted around 1795, but the chronological proximity of this piece with the cartoons causes many scholars to think that it is part of a series.

== Technique ==
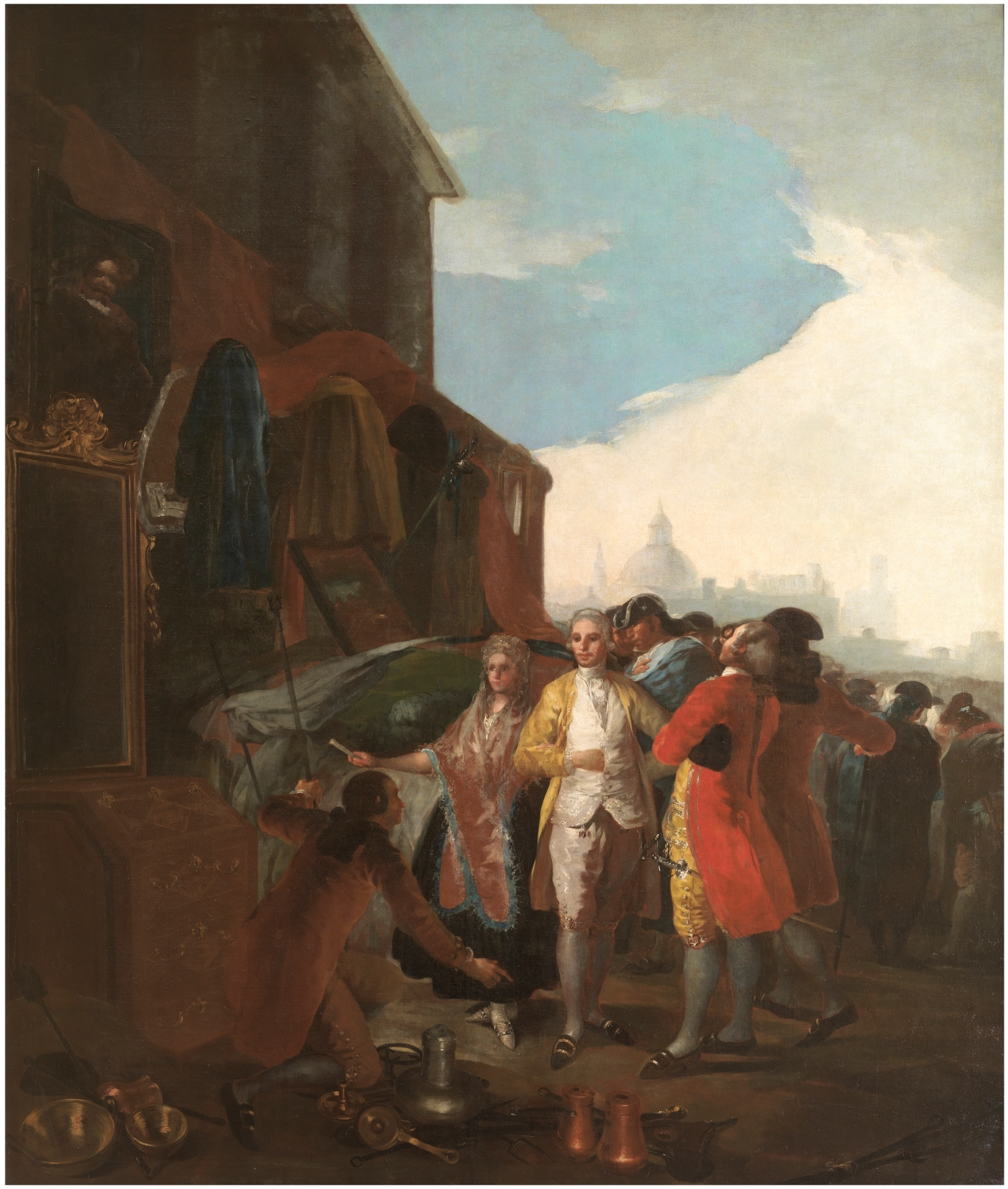
The Fair of Madrid.

Tapestries are weavings made in a similar way to carpets, which by combining threads of different colors and tones allow, as in a mosaic, to visually recreate real images.

The cartoons were a very precise sketch, in color and real size, of the motif that the weavers had to reproduce. These paintings owe their name of cartoon to the fact that they were usually painted on that material and not on canvas or board. The choice of such a humble support is explained by the fact that these models or patterns were not valued as autonomous works of art, and their conservation was not mandatory. The tapestries obtained were usually framed or embedded in the walls, although, as Tomlinson (1993) indicates, many times this task was not carried out and they were simply hung.

The loom is the most precise instrument for weaving a tapestry and its base is the warp. It is a set of parallel threads in a longitudinal direction on which the scenes of the cartoons are drawn. The making of the tapestry is a very slow task and it is carried out through two types of looms. In the high-warp loom the cartoon is placed behind and the weaver uses a mirror to handle the work with greater dexterity. The low-warp looms allow greater speed because it is done on the front side of the piece, and also greatly reduces the cost of the work because they do not match the quality of the tapestries woven in high-warp.

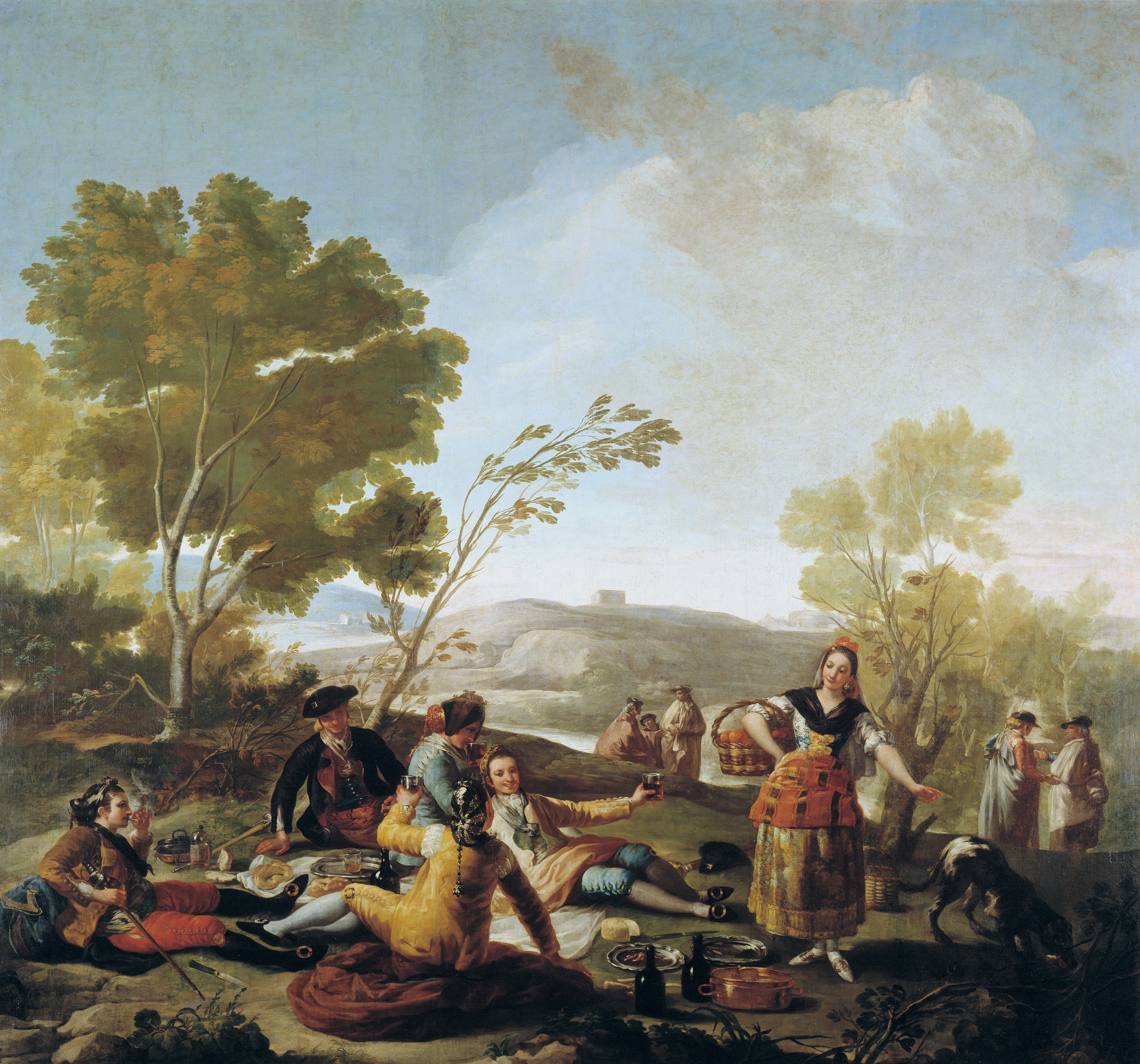
The Picnic.

The Royal Factory began its work with low-warp looms, but seven years later Antoine Lainger —from the Gobelinos factory— installed high-warp looms. In this way, works of better quality and fineness were achieved. 1727 is considered the peak year for tapestry in Spain.

A document from 1790 describes in detail the process of making cartoons. Measurements were taken of the room, mainly the walls, and sent to the director of the factory. Most of the clients asked for cartoons with country, jocular, allegorical themes, and only a minority requested cartoons with historical allusions.

In the specific case of Goya's cartoons, the weavers of the Royal Factory filed complaints against the Aragonese for the detail with which he made the sketches, especially that of The Meadow of San Isidro (1788). This sketch, of a pre-impressionist character, has such a large number of minute details that it was impossible to convert it into a tapestry. Craftsmanship restrictions were imposed in this case and thanks to this situation, together with the death of Charles III, the work remained only a sketch.

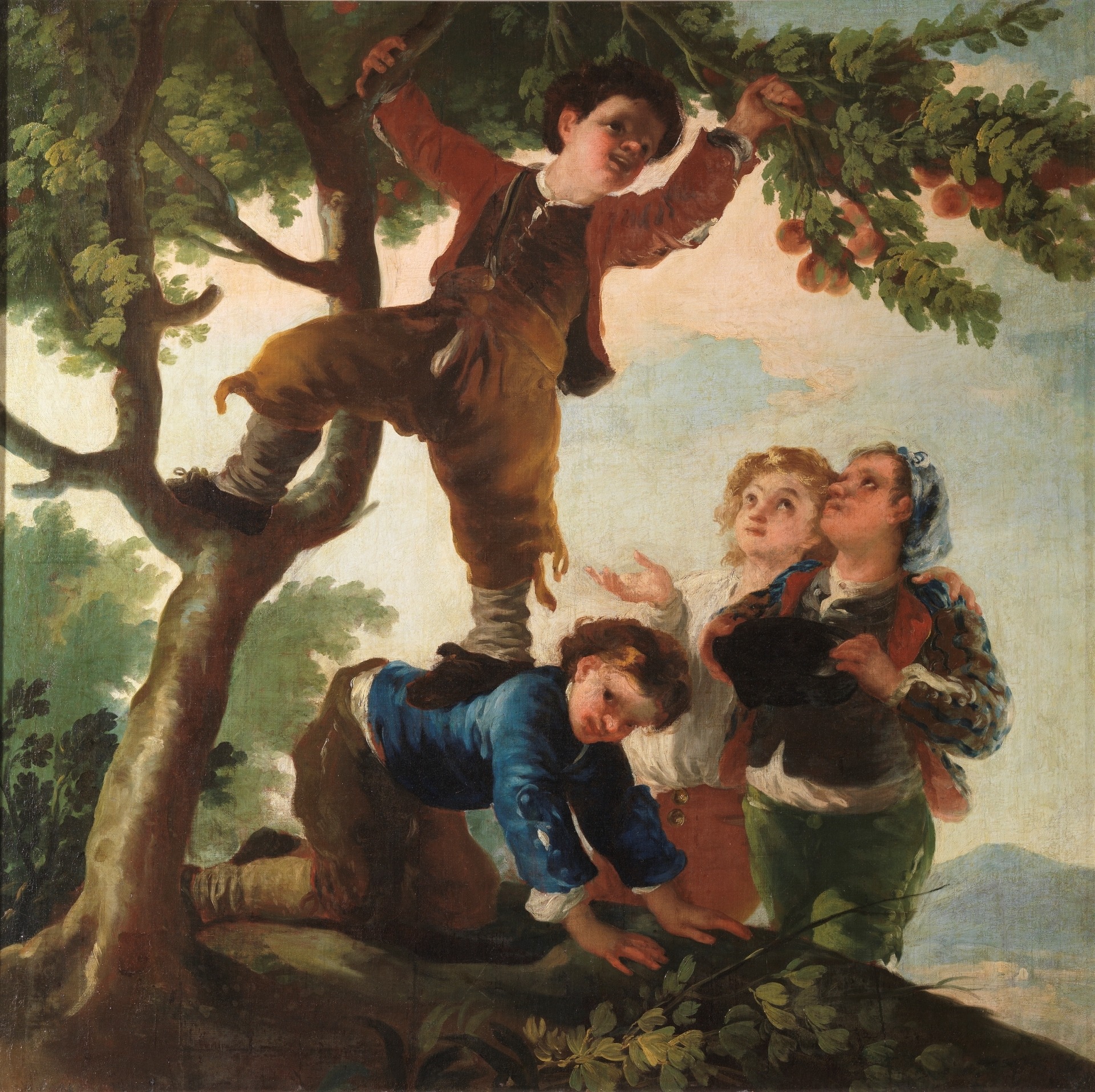
Boys Picking Fruit.

In The Fair of Madrid, the three central characters of the composition receive a strong luminous impulse. But in the tapestry more details were necessary —contrary to what would happen years later with The Meadow of San Isidro— and the luminosity of the original painting had to be scattered. The tapestry lost part of the essence of the sketch. In The Kite, a painting with a pyramidal structure, the colors of the jacket of the man in the foreground changed from reds to ochers and yellows. In 1780 Goya painted the sketches of The Washerwomen and The Tobacco Guards, which do not include some of the details found in the final paintings, but appear to have been drawn by Goya in collusion with the principal weavers.

== Structure ==
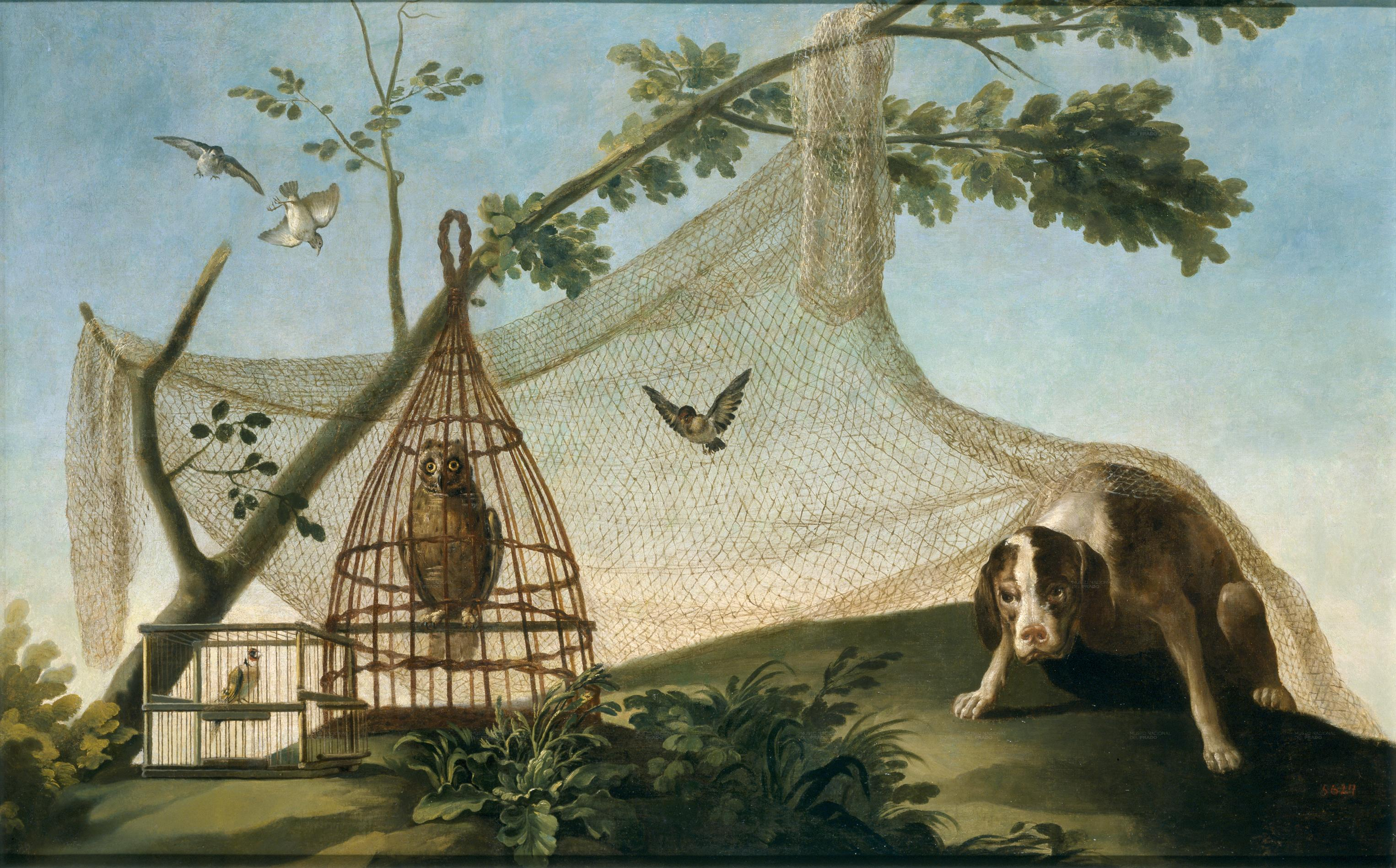
Hunting with a Decoy

No point of agreement has been established regarding the number of series that made up the tapestry cartoons. Bozal (2005) favors four series, as does Glendinning (2005). Again Tomlinson debates, designing a chronology of seven series, as she divides those proposed by Bozal and Glendinning. The Museo del Prado in its official guide tries to reconcile the three sources by establishing a chronology of five series of cartoons.

The following is a brief description of each series, according to the scheme proposed by Glendinning and Bozal:

- First series, hunting themes for the dining room of the princes of Asturias in El Escorial.
- Second series, popular amusements and country leisure for the Royal Palace of El Pardo.
- Third series, the seasons of the year and other scenes of social scope, destined to the dining room of the princes and the bedroom of the infantas of Spain in El Pardo.
- Fourth series, games and cheerful aspects of Spanish society. Elaborated for the office of the new king, Carlos IV, at El Escorial.

== Analysis ==
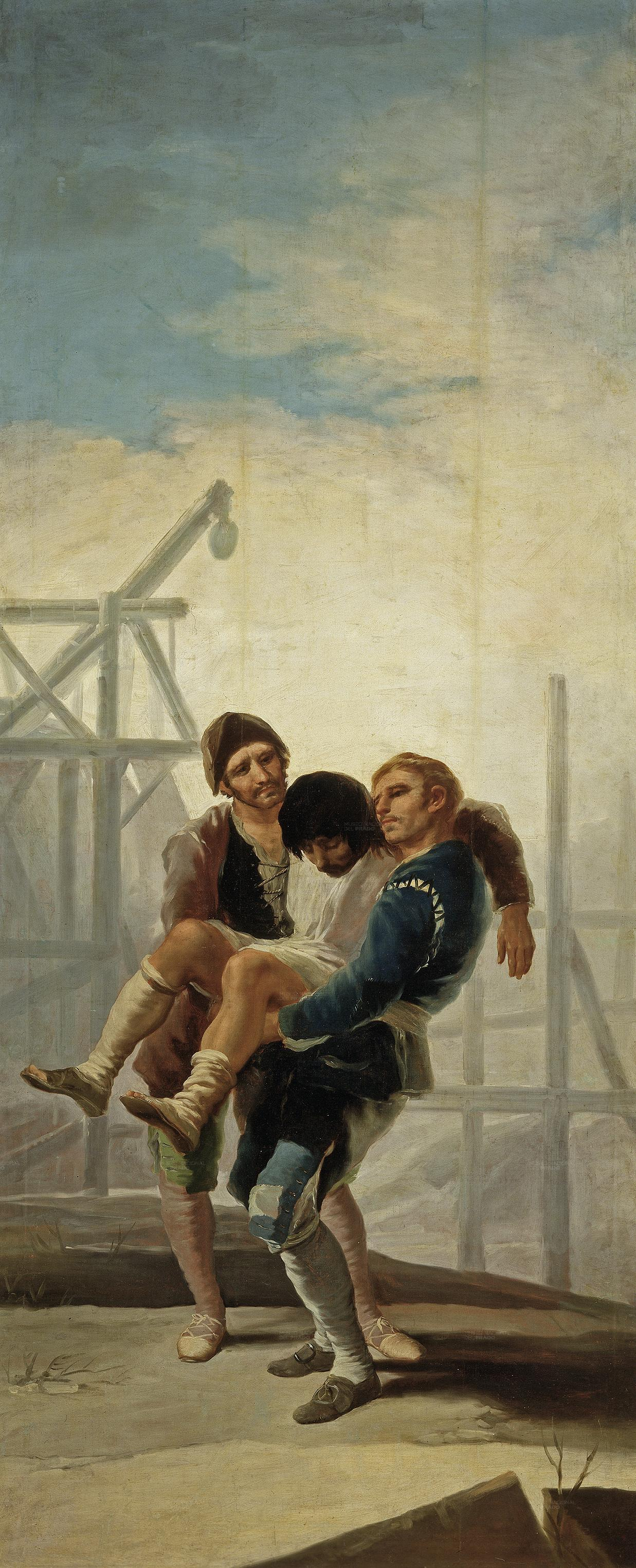
The Injured Mason. Hagen considers that it may be an allegory of the decree that Charles III had issued protecting artisans who were injured in their work.

=== Overall ===
When Goya arrived in Madrid, Charles III, like his son Charles, was a hunting enthusiast. The court had itinerant headquarters, as the king wished to spend most of his time outside the capital and at the royal sites set aside for hunting activities. In the Monastery of San Lorenzo de El Escorial the king's family resided from September to December, so it was necessary to fit out rooms that once belonged to the servants for the members of the royal family. But it was also necessary to decorate the rooms with tapestries and this led to the hiring of new painters for the Royal Factory, such as Goya. Meanwhile, at the Palace of El Pardo —about fifteen kilometers distant from Madrid— the court was housed from January 7 to Palm Sunday. Charles III doubled the size of the site and added an eastern wing to the palace complex. It was here that many of Goya's tapestries were hung, and he delivered four series of cartoons to adorn El Pardo.

Despite the fact that painting cartoons is not a work that left great fame for the painter, many specialized authors consider that Goya tried to reach the social summit through the cartoons. He could introduce himself in the capital, and more importantly, in the court. Years later, he was able to present his designs directly to the king and princes, and even kiss their hands. Thus, from being a simple provincial painter, he became one of the most renowned artists of the court.

In the royal rooms, where the tapestries were hung, good taste and the strict observance of artistic norms prevailed. The Aragonese mixed Tiepolesque rococo with the neoclassical art brought to the top by Mengs. The scenes must also have charm and variety in the themes. In spite of not being works of full realism, there are works in the series that overflow with verism, as in The Injured Mason or Poor Children at the Well.

Until then, the master from Fuendetodos had only worked on religious scenes. It was necessary to move away from the late baroque that these paintings expressed, and also from rococo, in order to obtain a piece "from life". Neoclassicism, so much in vogue during the decades prior to the execution of Goya's first cartoons, was not the most appropriate way to transmit the vivacity of a popular scene, such as those of children playing —who were sometimes aristocrats in disguise, in order to escape from their hieratic existence—. Picturesqueness required that the atmosphere, the type, the style, the landscapes and the scenes should be everyday and contemporary to the spectator, like a scene of daily life. They should also have a certain atmosphere of amusement and entertainment, which would arouse curiosity and would not distract the client's interest. The realism that the painting should possess would capture the motif by individualizing it, as the characters of costumbrista art are, on the contrary, representative members of a whole.

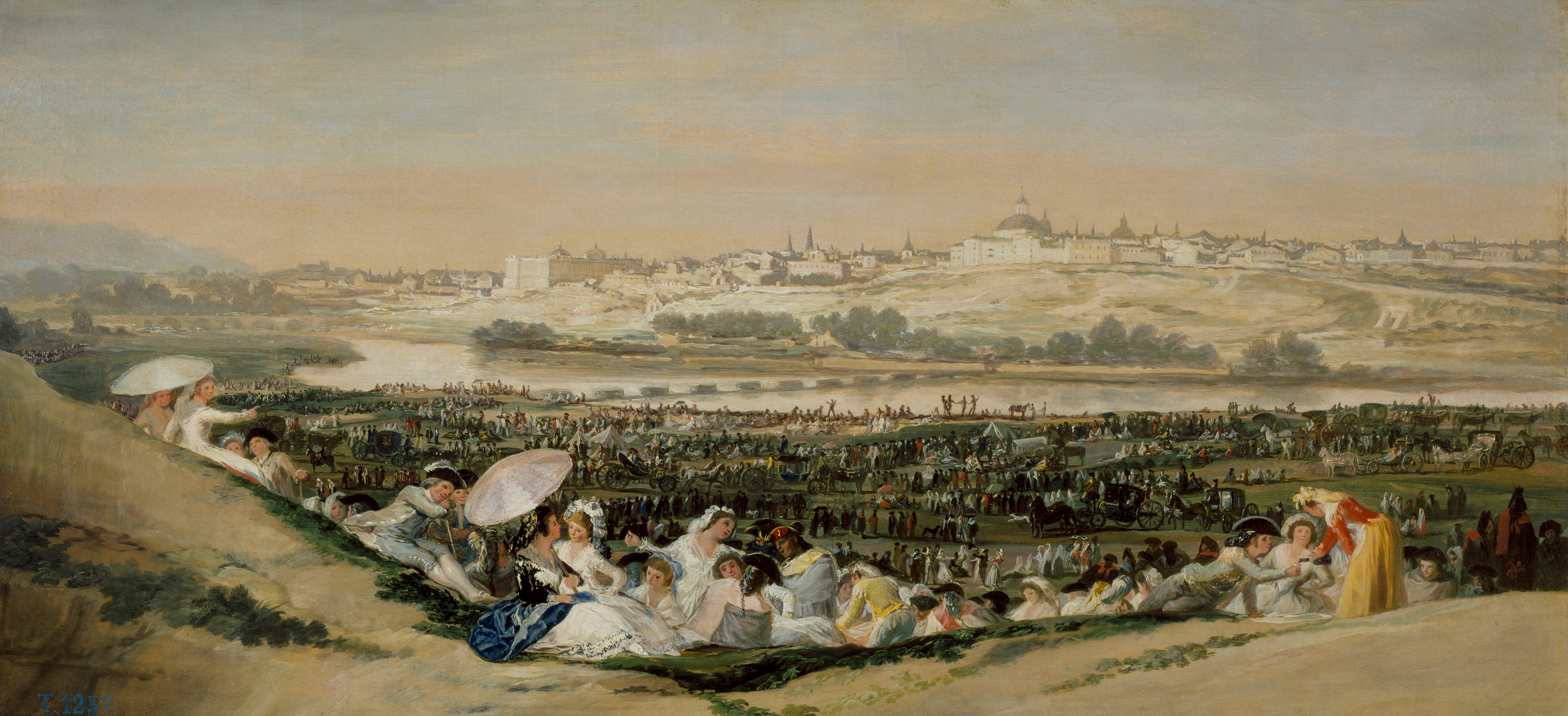
The smallest cartoon in the series, The Meadow of San Isidro. It was never transferred to tapestry. It shows elements of the Sublime.

It is natural that Goya should have painted hunting scenes for the Princes' dining room at El Escorial, a palace famed as one of the best known hunting grounds at court. Not surprisingly, the second series dealt with matters of country leisure, very appropriate for a dining room. In this case, his cartoons of Dance on the Banks of Manzanares, The Picnic and Boys Picking Fruit stand out.

But the fact that they were intended for royal rooms does not exclude the presence of violent scenes, which were an integral part of Spanish life at the time. Goya introduces dramatic notes in the series that will be the archetype for some of his engravings. Quarrel in the New Tavern is a violent scene that contrasts with the tranquility of cartoons such as The Parasol and The Picnic.

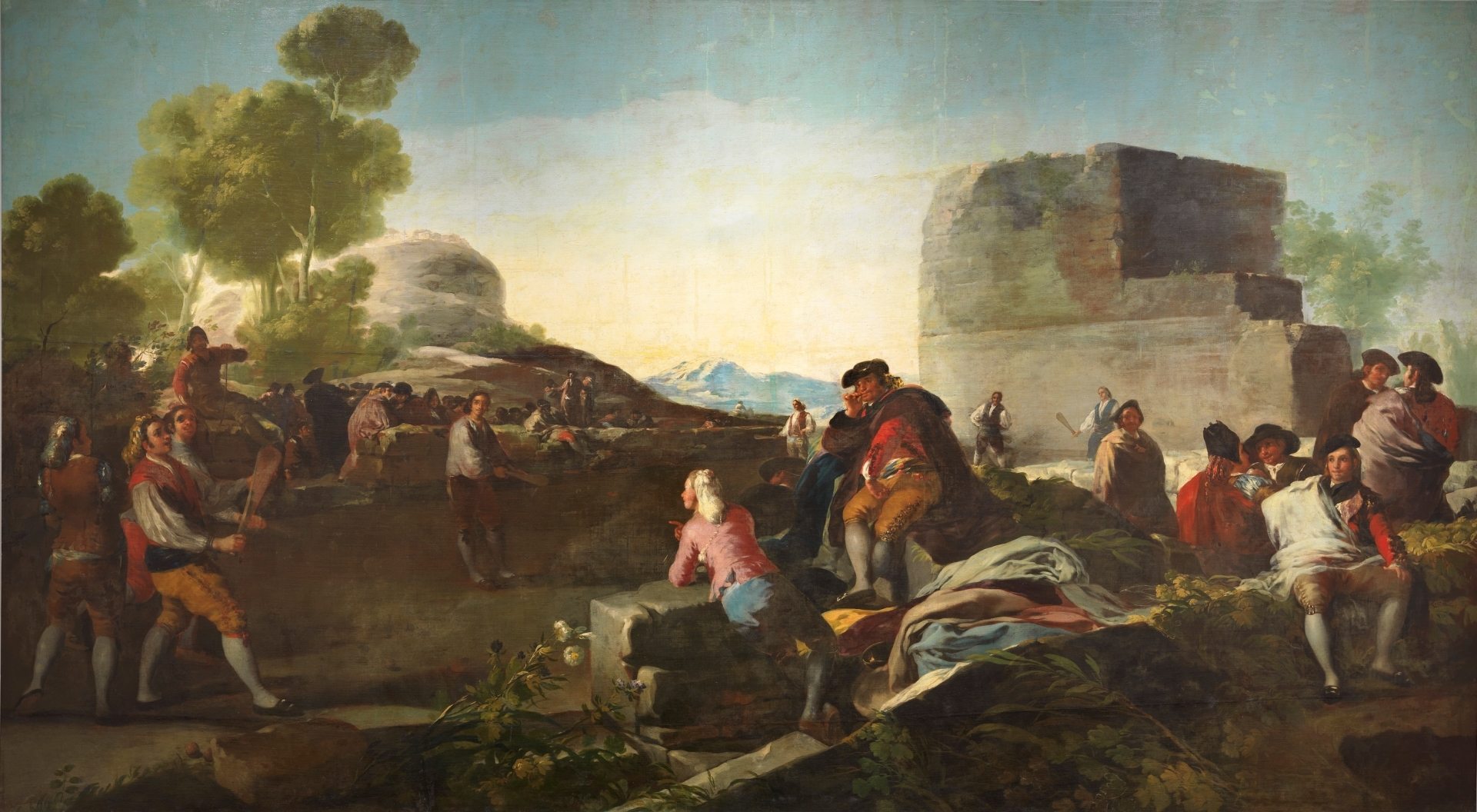
A Stickball Game.

A new style, which Mengs commented on in his Letter to Pons, appears, and Goya is one of its first exponents. Known as Lo Sublime Terrible, his contemporaries praised the force with which the Aragonese painter posed these themes. José Moreno de Tejada expressed this vision in a poem of 1804, where he refers to The Snowstorm as a "painting that seemed to him not only sublime but capable of expressing sadness and even terror through the landscape". But since his works were intended for royal rooms, Goya could not develop paintings that would fully receive the appellation of Sublime. The cartoons that include details with large crowds of people (The Meadow of San Isidro) could be an appropriate vehicle for developing the Sublime style. However, it is the minimal space they occupy that prevents them from delving into the elements of this style.

According to Glendinning, many times Goya's main idea for the cartoon was modified to suit the looms and even the taste of the princes. Goya had to prepare several times a straight tapestry according to the current conventions, as in The Young Bulls and The Kite, but not in The Parasol.

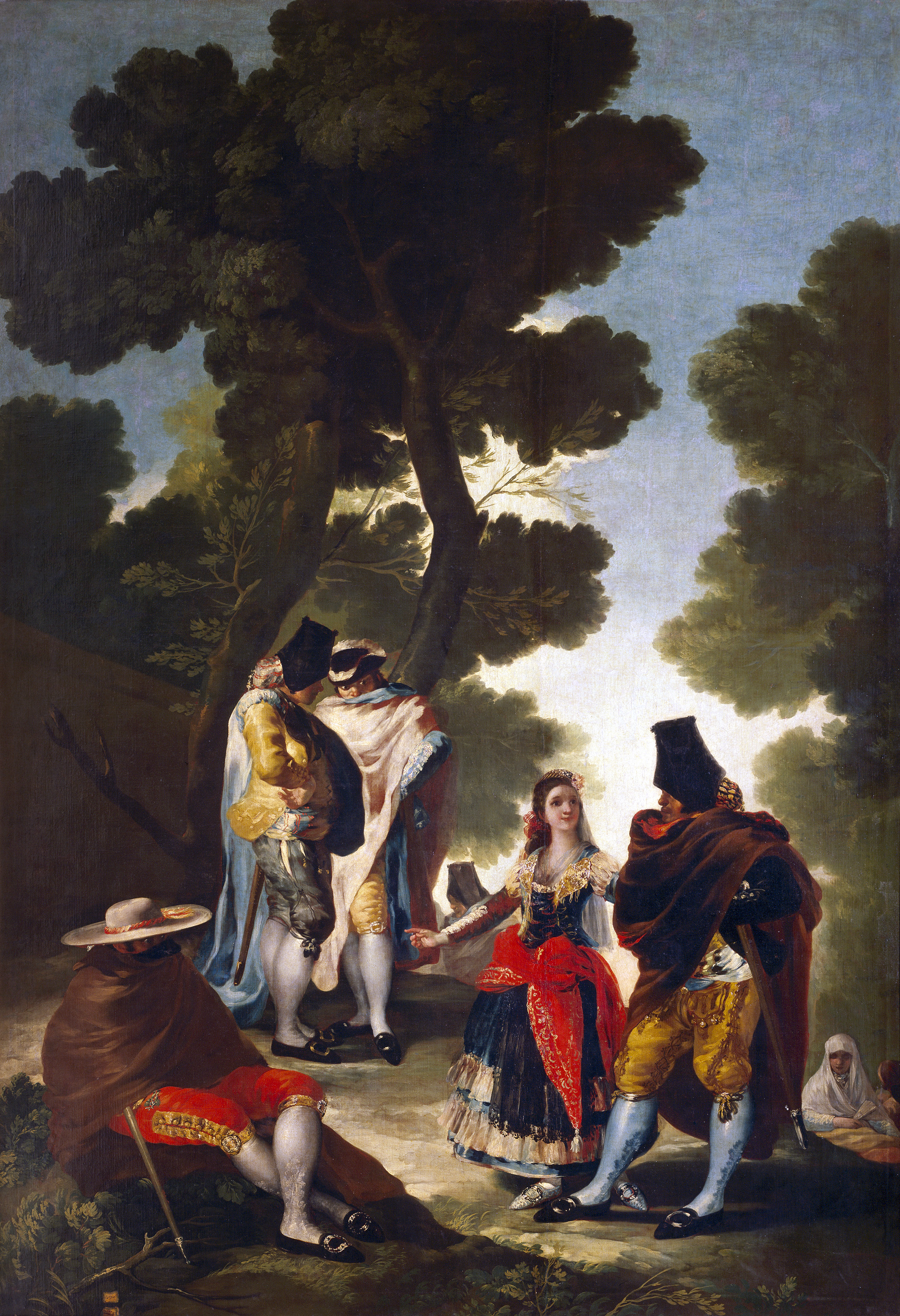
Maja and Cloaked Men.

==== Themes ====
Bucolic and hunting themes flood the compositions planned by the Aragonese for the Royal Factory. Unlike the court of the Habsburgs —especially Philip IV—, the Bourbons did not want scenes from the past but popular, country scenes that could represent how life was lived in Spain at the time.

Goya abandoned the religious and historical motifs with which he had worked in Zaragoza. In his first cartoons he was closely supervised by Bayeu, which is why these works are impregnated with his style. Hunting and fishing are treated in this first series, as they are the great hobbies of Prince Charles. This is consistent with the description of "popular scenes" that art scholars have given to the cartoons.

For the next series, Goya would adapt the scenes to the taste of Princess Maria Luisa of Parma, who wished to see tapestries with country scenes, the amusements of the majos and, in short, the joyful and amusing atmosphere of 18th-century Madrid. Hagen (2004) states that this was because the princess could not mix freely, as she wished, among the lower classes due to her very high rank.

A common motif in Goya's cartoons is childhood. Children Blowing up a Bladder, from the second series, is a covert homage to the work of Pieter Bruegel the Elder and also to some themes in German literature. According to Tomlinson, Goya had altercations with the weavers because of the inclusion of two men in the background of this cartoon, who would be virtually impossible to bring to tapestry. Despite this, the painting is the first example of the brevity of the children's fun and joy, a constant ideal in Goya's work. Another of the paintings with an allusion to childhood is Boys Picking Fruit, strongly related to another painting from a later series, Boys Climbing a Tree. The cartoon includes a metaphor related to the state of the fruit: if it is ripe, great sensual satisfaction will be obtained; if it is rotten, the effort will have been in vain. This allegory was expressed by Diego de Torres Villarroel in La fortuna varia y loca.

The majos are common in Goyaesque art. Maja and Cloaked Men is the most faithful representation —and perhaps a tribute— to the way of being and living of the majos, who a few months earlier had led a revolt against the prohibition of the cape and brimmed hat.

The Frenchification in Spain is evident after the arrival of the Bourbons. It is possible that the precedents of the neoclassical painters influenced Goya in his second series. The Parasol shows a young woman dressed in the Spanish style but with a Gallic hairstyle. It is also possible that it is a maja, but the most accepted hypothesis recognizes a young woman at the peak of beauty, at fifteen years of age and when they begin to consider marriage. The same approach to French art can be seen in another classic work of cartoons, The Blind Man's Bluff.

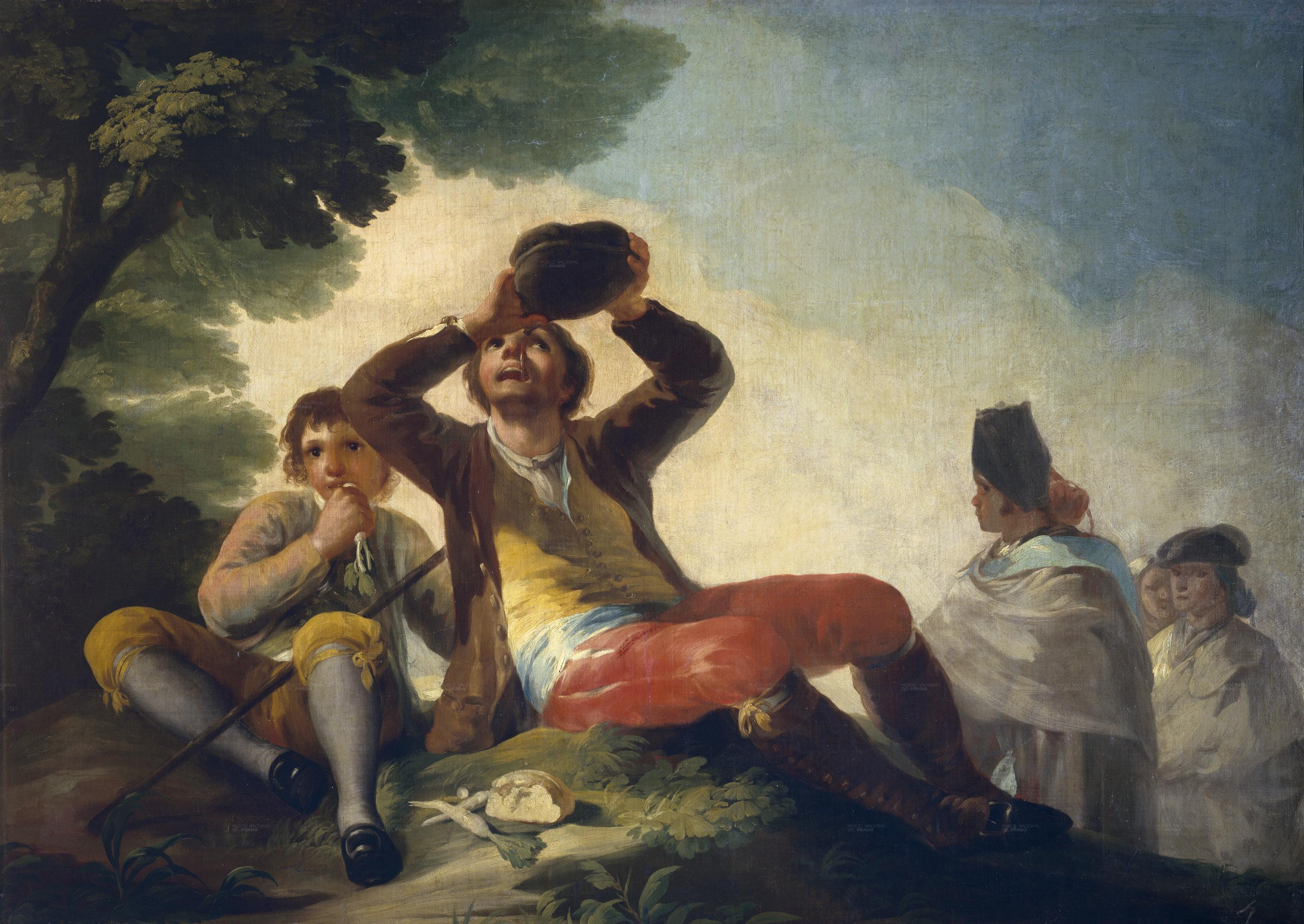
The Drinker. It is a sample of the pyramidal scheme unanimously acclaimed in Goya's time. It is one of the most folksy and popular scenes of the cartoons.

Although the Aragonese painted only cheerful subjects for the royal palaces, in his last series of cartoons one can guess the verism that he would use in later paintings, such as The Charge of the Mamelukes or Los fusilamientos del tres de mayo. The Snowstorm completely abandons the theme of country amusements and shows peasants suffering the inclemencies of winter. From the same year dates The Injured Mason, which refers to the pain and suffering of the lower class, but at the same time alludes to a decree issued by the king protecting artisans from the misfortunes that could befall them.

Two of his last cartoons —The Wedding and Straw Man— reveal the satirical character of the author. The first is a scathing criticism of arranged marriages. In a village, a beautiful young woman is married to an old man with a simian face. It may even be a precedent of Los caprichos. While in Straw Man, a painting of a rural nature, the women have fun playing with the doll that represents a man. In the sketch, the man was shown with his head high and fallen at the end, like a helpless victim. In short, it is a symbolic game full of evil that could allude, like Chicken Games, to the change of ministers in Spain at the time.

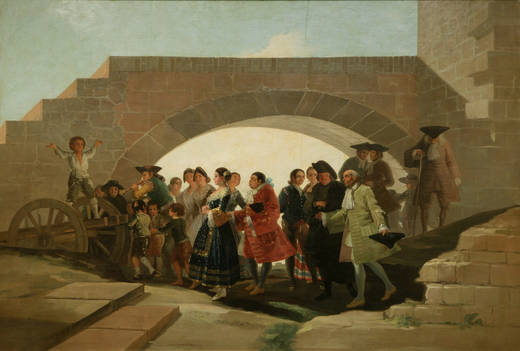
The Wedding (1792).

==== Style ====
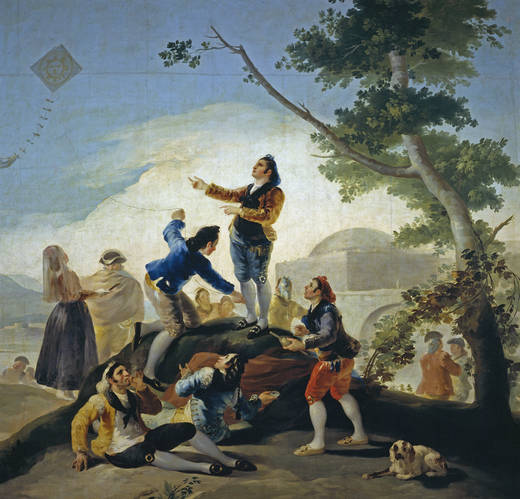
The Kite.

The style of Goya's cartoons often reflects his aspirations and pretensions to obtain a higher social status. The new style of the cartoons can be appreciated from 1786, when Goya returned to the factory, already a reputable artist with a high social status. The academic, almost neoclassical style of Amiconi and Tiepolo strongly influenced the Aragonese, especially in the series of the four seasons.

After being named painter of the chamber by Charles IV in 1789, Goya obtained even more prestige, which was reflected in his art. In those years he completed The Meadow of San Isidro. In spite of being an appropriate frame for sexual insinuations, the painter refuses to do so because the cartoon would be destined for the bedroom of the little infants. Likewise, the allegorical and metaphorical nature of his works of this period makes the last series of cartoons more inclined to human folly than to other details of royal taste.

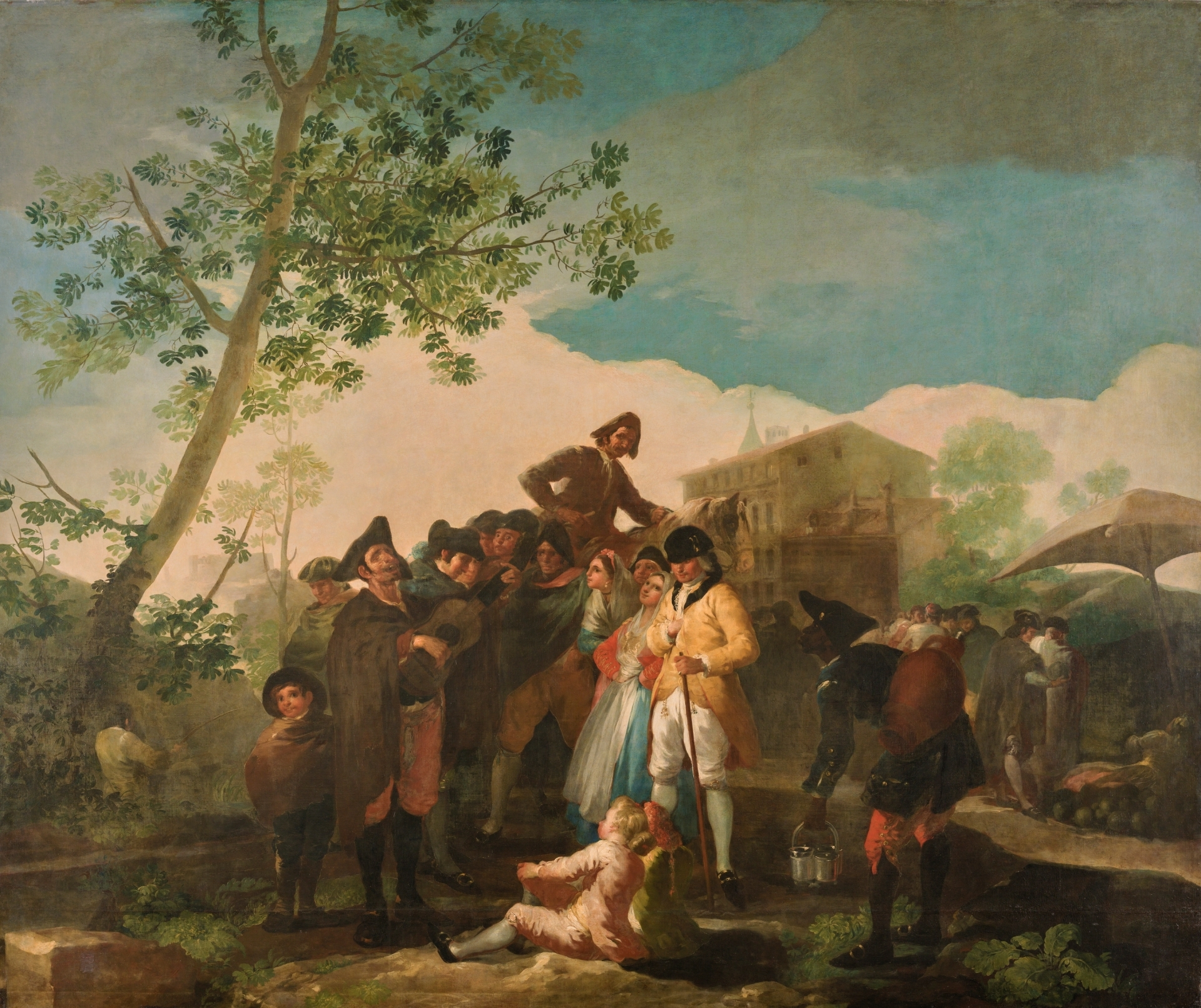
The Blind Guitarist.

Goya's cartoons often resort to depicting popular life in Madrid, and also show the gradual Frenchification of the city, as it dresses and adopts the customs of the neighboring country. Despite the very strong rejection of the Gauls —popularly known as "gabachos", to this day—, the Spanish, not only the people of Madrid, even accepted a French ruler at the dawn of the 18th century. But the delicate balance that would be established in the second half of the century would be definitively broken in the War of Independence, with which the romantic ideal of the search for a national identity would gain strength.

Glendinning points out that many of Goya's early compositions use a pyramidal scheme, such as The Kite, The Drinker and The Blind Guitarist. A faithful admirer of Velázquez, the Aragonese artist used a strong and decisive brushstroke that often caused problems for the weavers. He accentuated the details of light, the master left aside the shadows and broke the existing balance between the two most important elements of the pictorial composition. It is known that Goya's way of working prevented the realization of a first version of The Blind Guitarist, so the painter was forced to substitute a man with a cart for a leaning tree and a fisherman. The same thing happened three years earlier with Hunting Party, where Goya had to radically change the location and the color of the hunter's jacket in the foreground.

==== Influences ====
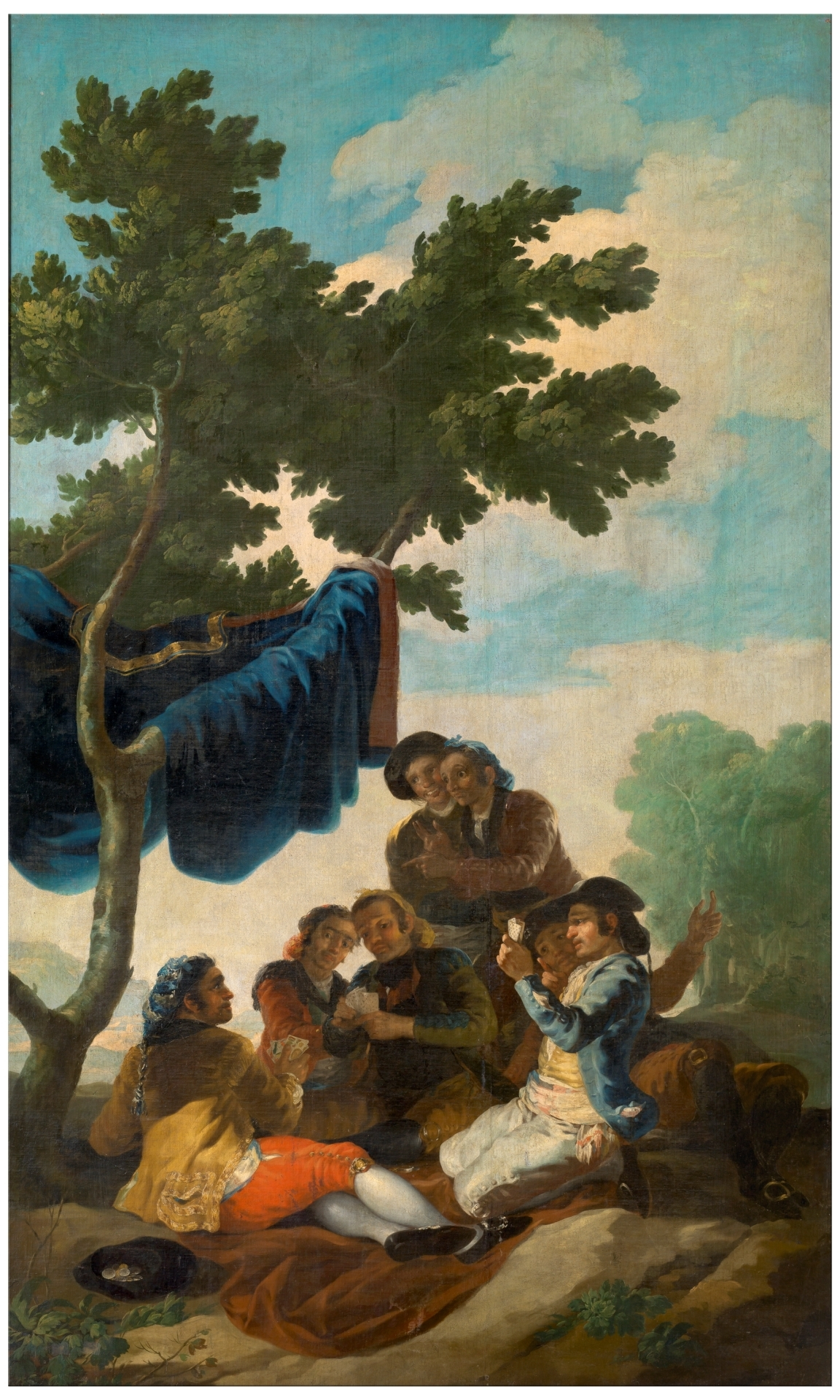
Card Players.

In his early years, Goya had been a pupil of the master José Luzán, one of the most reputable painters in his native Zaragoza. Although not many references to this artist can be found in his paintings, one of the most notable is in The Meadow of San Isidro.

Italian art, which Goya had been able to study during his trip in 1771, left its mark on some of the tapestries. Tomlinson (1993) notes that the works of the two leading Italian painters of the time, Tiepolo and Amiconi, may have inspired several of Goya's cartoons. The academicist rigidity, used especially in mythological and historical subjects —like Tiepolo's works—, was combined with the delicate and fine rococo art to give rise to some of Goya's most famous cartoons. Italian Baroque also influenced Goya, in works such as Hunter and his Dogs and Shepherd Playing a Pipe. Both are related to some drawings by Italian engravers that Goya may have met during his travels in Italy. Caravaggio painted The Cardsharps, whose scheme and tonalities Goya reproduces in Card Players.

Rococo is the style of all Goya's cartoons except for The Snowstorm, The Injured Mason, Poor People ar the Fountain and their respective sketches. The painter used a palette of warm tones, reinforced by touches of impasto, a style that gave Goya the possibility of creating his own pyramidal scheme. Thus, he placed the main characters in the foreground, the environmental beings behind a mound and in the background a well-worked landscape. The main features of rococo that can be admired in Goya are: vivacity, immediacy, curiosity, chromatism of soft pinks, gauzy textures in the skirts of the women, a luminous background landscape, etc.

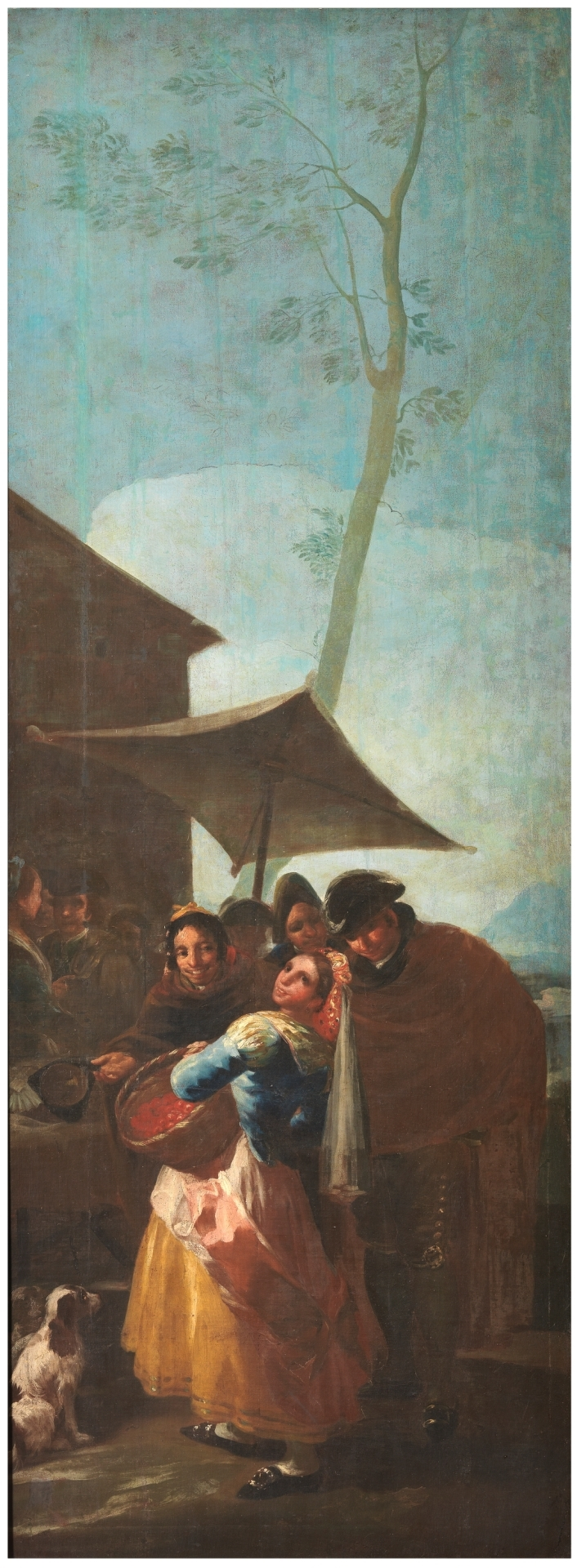
The Haw Seller.

The Parasol is the work most closely related to French painting. Tomlinson and Baticle point out as prototype of the painting the works The Concert, by Boucher, and the engraving Près de vous belle Iris by Lancret, by Horthmals, of which a print is preserved in the Royal Palace of Madrid that could have been studied by Goya. Other feasible hypotheses point to the influence of The Finding of Moses, by Charles de La Fosse and The Wild Boar Hunt, a fine allegory of Europe by Joseph Parrocel; in both the detail of the umbrella appears. On the other hand, the Frenchman Jean Ranc was a painter at the court of Philip V, but before going to Spain he painted Vertumnus and Pomona (Musée Fabre of Montpellier), which Goya must have known through a print. The taste for Ranc at court must have spurred the Aragonese to paint The Parasol.

Other paintings by Goya may have been inspired by Fragonard's Love Letters and Michel-Ange Houasse's Women at the Fountain. The latter is preserved in the royal collections of the Royal Palace of Madrid. It is highly probable that it was seen by Goya, who would take it as an example for Young Women with Pitchers.

The literature of the time was of great importance to Goya in the creation of some of his works. The Fair at Madrid and The Picnic are illustrations of sainetes by Ramón de la Cruz, a well-known comedian. Leandro Fernández de Moratín, a friend of Goya's, was interested in the theme of the unequal marriage depicted in The Wedding. Finally, The Tobacco Guards deals with a subject that Francisco de Quevedo and the Count of Villamediana liked, who composed sonnets about it. There is even a parallelism with the much-used theme of the lazarillo, in The Drinker.

The Swing and The Young Bull could represent a passage written by Nicolás Fernández de Moratín, Leandro's father, in his clandestine poem Arte de las putas:

Let the diestro flee from such an accursed custom
always give the hurgonazo in passing
to Cándido inciting, the great bullfighter
who, by the prompt, is clean his thrust

— Arte de las putas (II, 135-138)

Regarding the largest painting of the last series, The Wedding, Bozal explains the particular transition from the rococo that impregnated most of the cartoons to an accentuated neoclassicism, which Goya would bring to its peak at the dawn of the 19th century. The painter had already tried to take his art from rococo to neoclassicism, as evidenced by The Meadow of San Isidro.

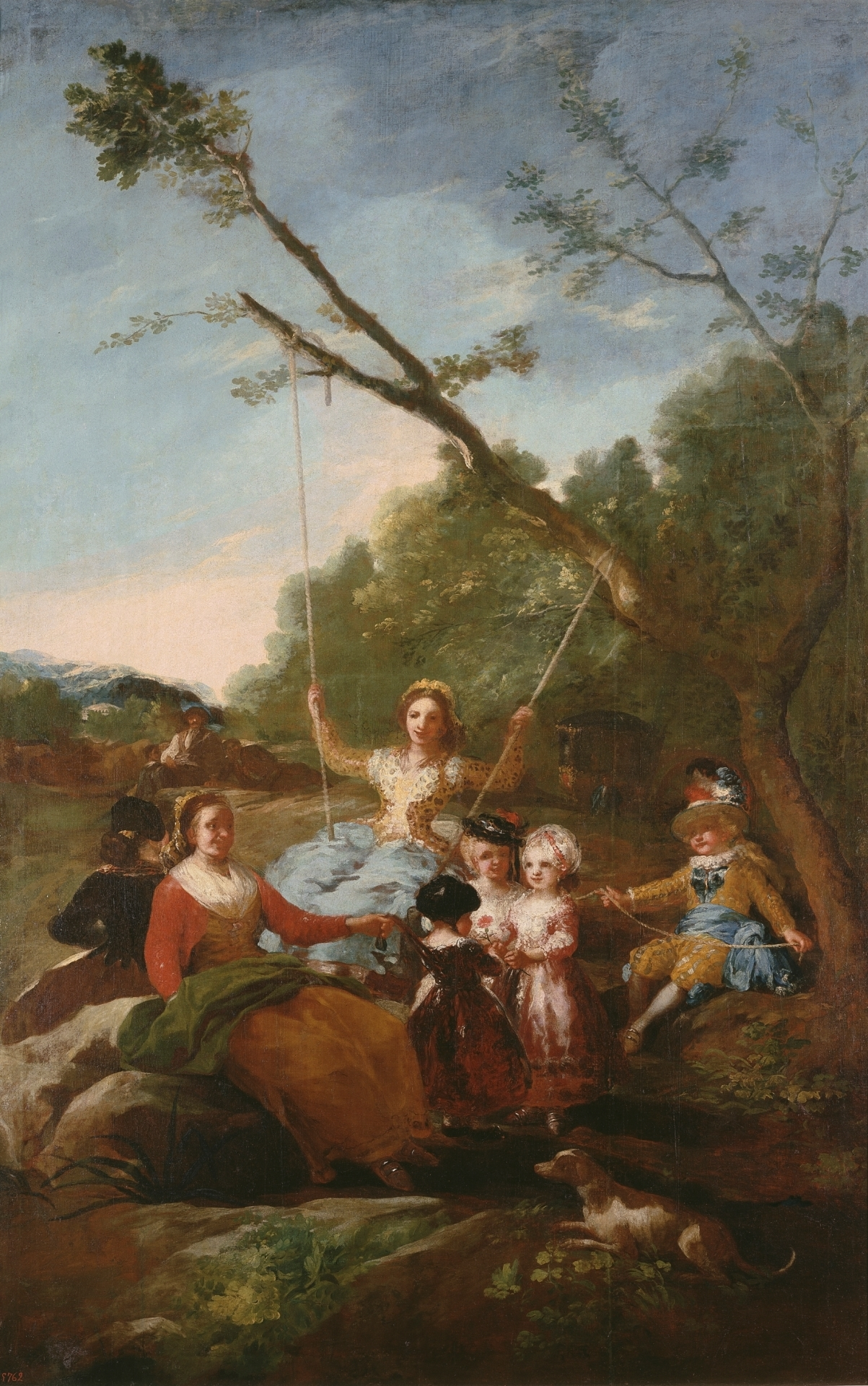
The Swing.

In The Quail Shoot, as in all the paintings of the first and some of the second, the imprint of Mengs — pyramidal composition— and Bayeu —vivid colors and naturalistic figures— who directed Goya's works, is revealed. Some court cartoonists, such as José del Castillo, simultaneously influenced these early works.

William Hogarth was an English painter characterized by his strong representations of childhood, models repeated by Goya in The Blind Guitarist. It is the only evocation of English painting found in his cartoons. The Woodcutters and Majo with Guitar respond to similar works by Zacarías González Velázquez and Ramón Bayeu, although the latter showed a greater superiority to Goya in his composition.

The imprint of Bartolomé Esteban Murillo and other exponents of Baroque art in Spain is clear in paintings such as Boys Picking Fruit and Boys Climbing a Tree. Murillo made several compositions where he enhanced the role of children playing at picking fruit.

The egregious figure of Diego Rodríguez de Silva y Velázquez, from whom Goya would have been able to study some works owned by the Royal House, is the strongest influence of Spanish art in his cartoons, especially in technique. Jovellanos admires this in his friend the painter. The influence of the Sevillian master was reinforced after the period that the Aragonese spent with the Infante Luis. Goya can make use of rapid brushstrokes to give life to the painting, through a magnificent abstract effect.

In almost all the cartoons of the third and fourth series Goya applies a technique with strong colors and a large spotlight placed in the center of the painting, as Velázquez did in his younger years. The river of The Tobacco Guards uses a brushstroke identical to the one used by the Sevillian, while the still lifes and tiles of The Pottery Vendor underlie a tribute to the painter and his Christ in the House of Martha and Mary.

The portrait in the background of The Fair of Madrid evokes the style of Velázquez, and the arrangement of figures and brownish tones in A Stickball Game also recall the Sevillian master.

The only influence of foreign art, besides French and British, that can be found in these Goyaesque works is that of Rembrandt. The Dutchman, as Goya said, was "his master", along with Velázquez and nature. The vivid tonalities and the stain effect that The Swing produces in the viewer are an implicit reference to Rembrandt's art.

==== References in later works by Goya ====
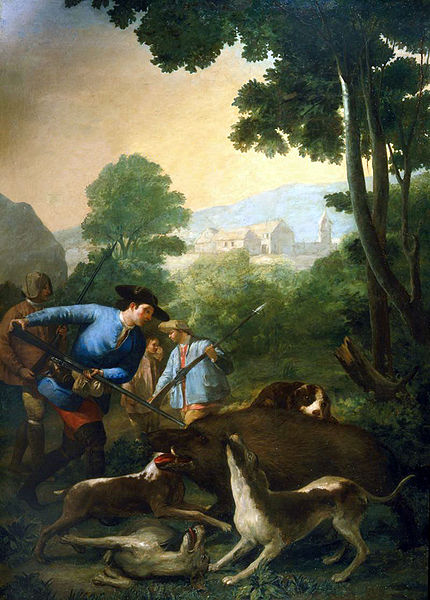
Wild Boar Hunt.

Shortly after completing the fifth series, Goya made seven ornamental paintings for the country estate of the Dukes of Osuna. The scenes are predominantly rural and quiet, gentle subjects prevail in these paintings. The harmonious and pleasing colors do not prevent Goya from believing that scenes of country leisure should be left for the bucolic residences. There was no amusement in any of Goya's paintings, and even in some of them there is an atmosphere of violence (Stagecoach Hijacking). The similarity with the cartoons lies in the fact that the paintings of the Osuna villa reflect the same country atmosphere as the tapestries, especially the one located on the banks of the Manzanares.

Glendinning recognizes that The Snowstorm and The Injured Mason, undertaken at that time, are Goya's main source of inspiration for these paintings. The presence of "dangers" that denote both are a faithful sign that the Aragonese no longer believed in picturesqueness and longed to separate himself from the customs imposed on the tapestries.

Los caprichos is a series of engravings designed by Goya in the nineties. Its first stage is framed within the aesthetic climate favored by the cartoons. Maja and Cloaked Men, from the second series, is a direct precedent of some of the most characteristic scenes of the etchings of Los caprichos, where the game of love and jealousy becomes the argumentative center of the composition.

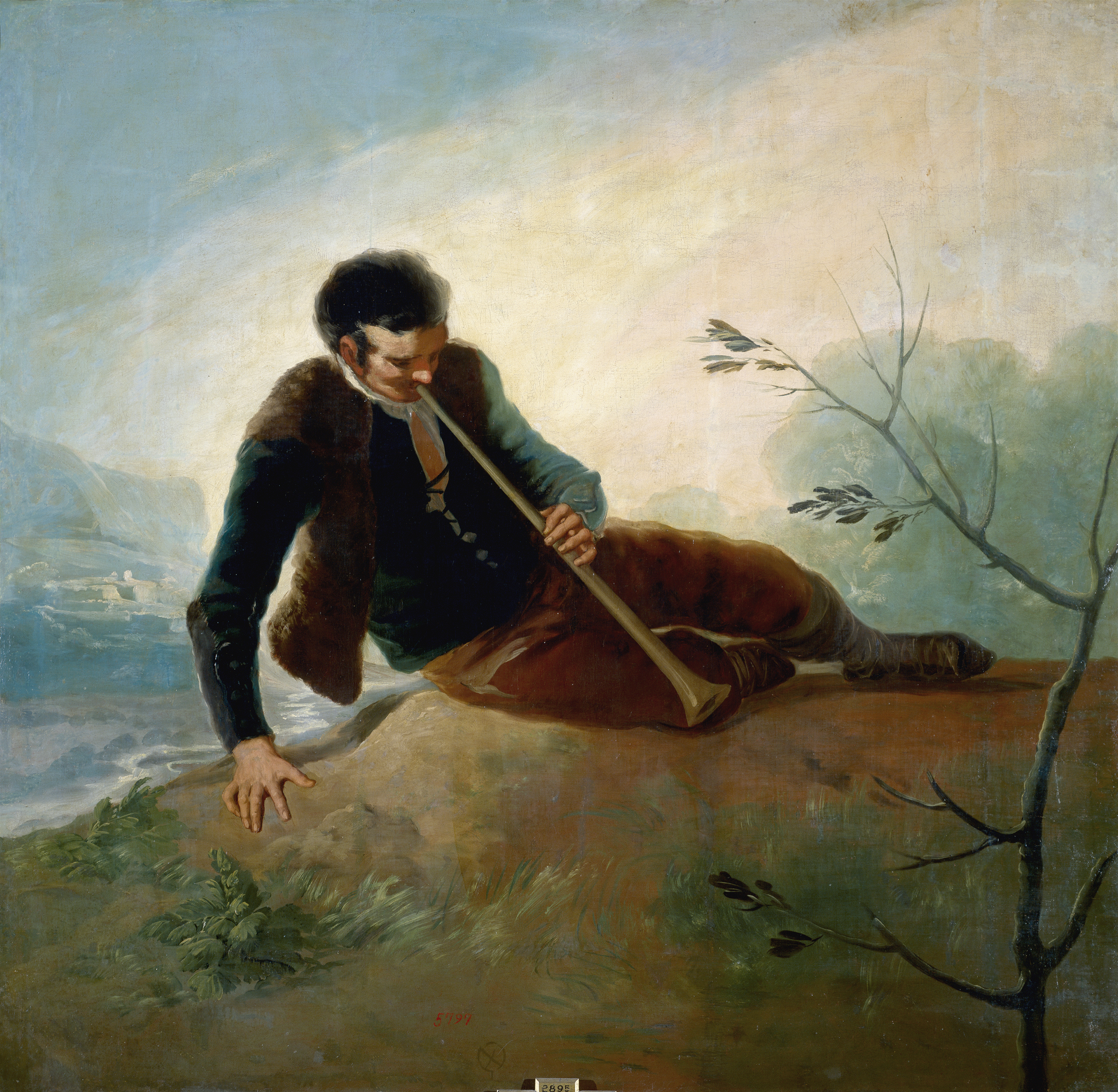
Shepherd Playing a Pipe.

In the paintings of the last series, a tense and deceitful relationship between the two sexes prevailed —one of Goya's favorite themes, which he developed in Los caprichos—, and Tomlinson (2008) notes that preparatory drawings for such a series may have been developed since then. Such is the case of The Straw Manikin and The Wedding, which, as mentioned above, are covert satires of the world of relationships.

Chicken Fights is a sarcastic allegory of the removals and appointments of ministers in the time of Charles IV, although disguised as a harmless children's game. To Rise and To Fall, capricho number 56, published in 1799, repeats the scene but now ironizing the secretaries of state in the form of grotesque dolls.

Goya's sharp irony reached its peak with the so-called Black Paintings (1819–1823). The work of this group that is most closely linked to the tapestry cartoons is A Pilgrimage to San Isidro, although the same subject is treated in Pilgrimage to the Fountain of San Isidro. The same theme had been touched upon by Goya more than three decades earlier (sixth series of cartoons: The Meadow of San Isidro and The Chapel de San Isidro), but now, instead of a display of wholesome fun, drunkenness and unhinged faces are present. The same theme, which Goya used to love, was used for his 1812 work The Burial of the Sardine.

=== By series ===
The seven series scheme proposed by Tomlinson in her studies is reproduced here. As mentioned above, there is no uniform criterion for determining the exact number of series.

==== First series (1775) ====
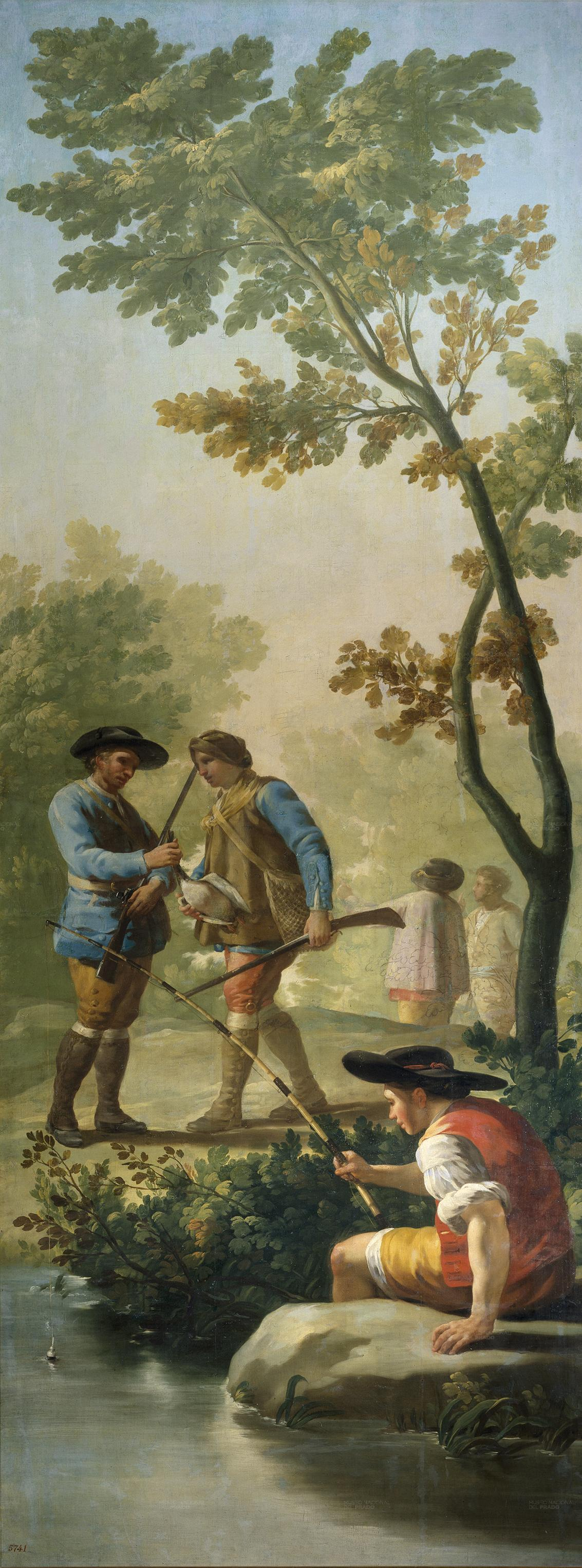
The Angler.

When he arrived at the Royal Factory, Goya had only painted religious, historical or mythological paintings. It was Bayeu to whom Goya owed his training as a carton painter. In fact, the delivery receipt for Goya's first five cartoons was made out in Bayeu's name. The same document stipulates that these cartoons were executed under his direction by Goya. All the receipts for the following series appear in the name of the painter from Fuendetodos.

This first series was long ignored by Goya scholars, as it was usually attributed to Ramón or Francisco Bayeu. In the shadow of his brother-in-law, the painter began a difficult period at court and his name was even confused: "Ramón Goya", as he was called in a document of the period.

The first series of tapestry cartoons consists of nine paintings on hunting themes, Prince Charles' main interest. The dining room of the heirs to the throne at El Escorial —the palace where hunting exercises were most practised— was to be decorated with them. Unlike in other series, the exact place of each painting in the dining room is not known. In this series Goya depicts more realistic, everyday scenes.

It was painted in collaboration with his brother-in-law Ramón Bayeu and under the watchful eye of his wife's other brother, Francisco. The mark of the elder Bayeu is perceptible both in the preparatory drawings and in the resulting cartoons, as he indicated to the young Goya the subjects to be treated. On 24 May 1775 Bayeu delivered five of Goya's cartoons to Cornelio Vandergroten: The Boar Hunt (the largest painting in the series), Hunting Party, The Angler (the only painting in the series related to fishing, although some hunting activities can be identified in the background), Boys Hunting with Owl and a still life identified as Hunting Still Life. Other paintings in the series, delivered on 30 October, were the over-doors of Hunting Dogs and Hunting with a Decoy, as well as two corner paintings with the themes of Hunter with his Dogs and Hunter Loading his Shotgun.

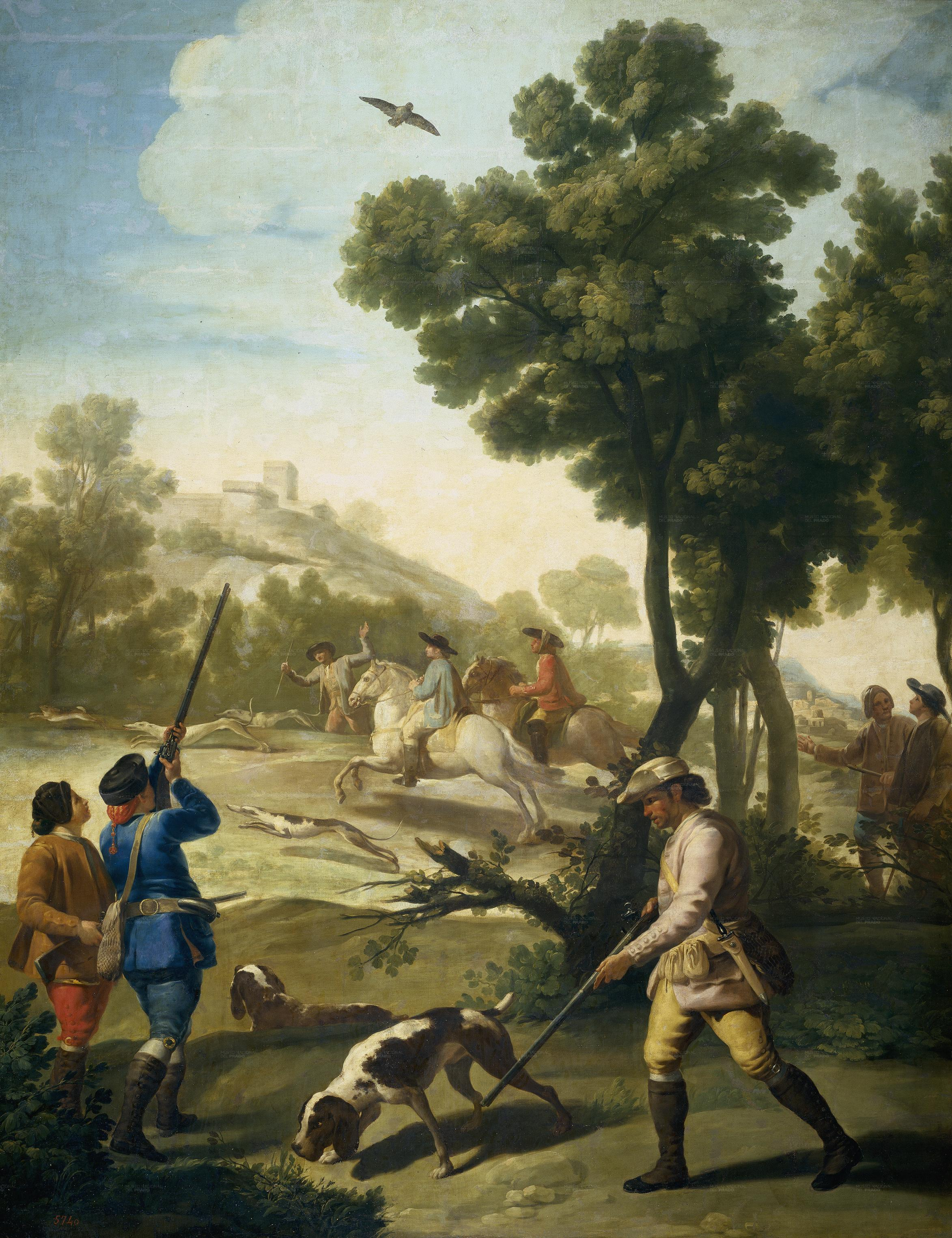
Hunting Party

This series is characterised by outlined contours, loose pastel brushstrokes, rounded-faced and static characters. The drawings, mostly done in charcoal, also bear witness to the very clear influence of Bayeu. The layout is different from other cartoons by Goya, where the figures are more free and dispersed throughout the space. It is more oriented to the needs of the weavers than to the painter's artistic creativity. It resorts to the pyramidal composition, as in Hunting with a Decoy and Hunting Party.

It may have been well received in the factory and at court, as the directors —especially Mengs— encouraged Goya to make "cartoons of his own invention". He did not return to the subject of hunting until ten years later, with the painting Hunter by a Spring.

The traditionalism of the subjects in this series, together with the impersonal style, makes it difficult to attribute the cartoons correctly without documents. Until the 19th century, the works in this set were usually taken to be the work of Francisco Bayeu.

The most accomplished and important composition in the series, Hunting Party, has some obvious flaws in colour and tonality, but it proves Goya's ability to paint a good hunting scene.

==== Second series (1776–1778) ====
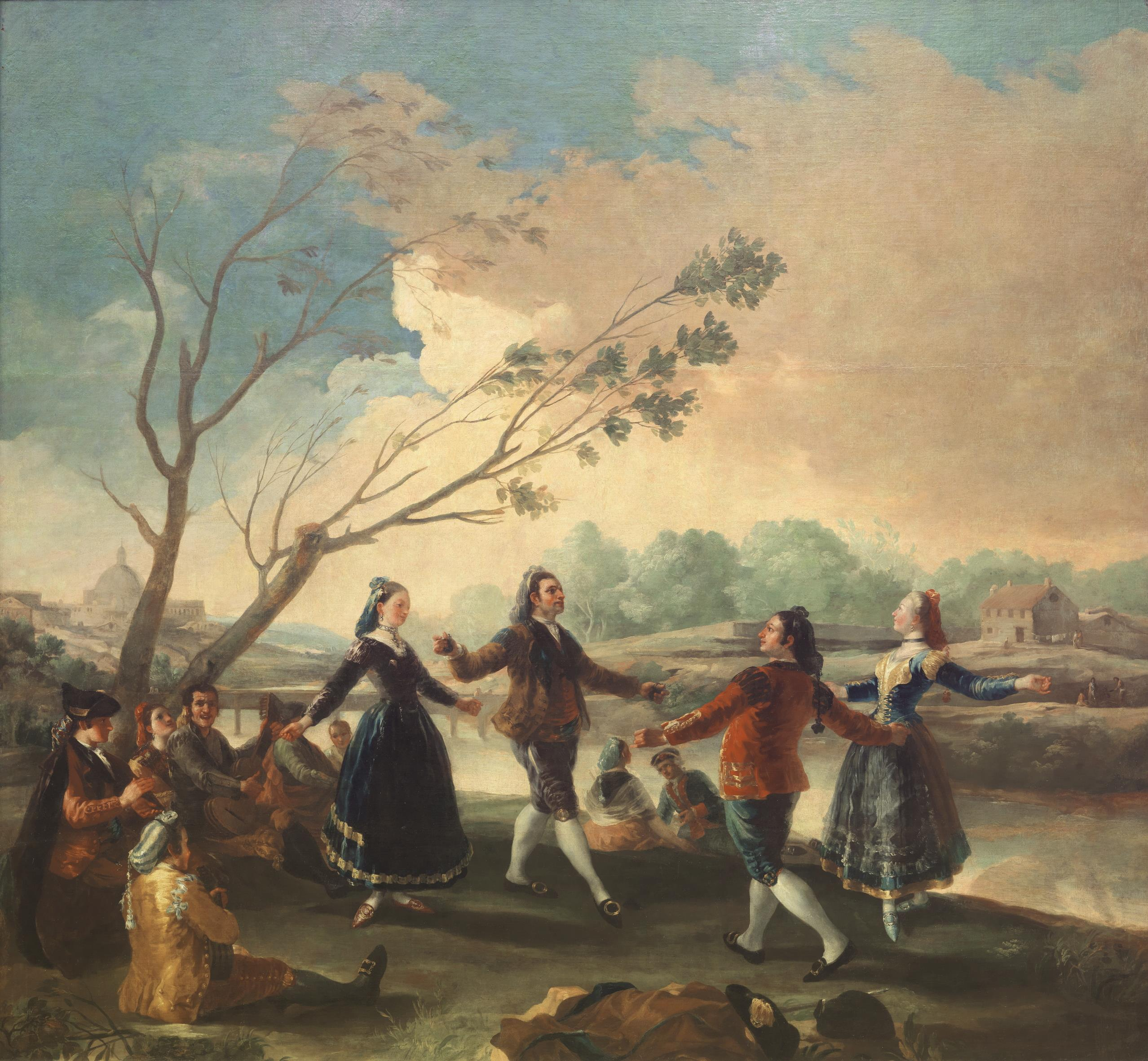
Dance on the Banks of Manzanares or Dance of San Antonio de la Florida.

For this series Goya had already freed himself from the powerful influence of Bayeu and for the first time conceived cartoons for his own. For the Dining Room of the Prince and Princess of Asturias in El Pardo, he drew on the courtly taste of the time, which wanted to get closer to its people. The aristocrats wanted to be like the majos, to look like them and even went so far as to dress up in majos' clothes to take part in their parties. This is why Goya includes mentions of this group in almost all the cartoons in this series.

The second series of cartoons consists of Picnic on the Banks of the Manzanares, Dance of San Antonio de la Florida, An Avenue in Andalusia, The Parasol, The Kite, The Drinker, Quarrel in the New Tavern, Boys Picking Fruit and Children Blowing up a Bladder. According to José Rogelio Buendía's study, most of the cartoons in the series were delivered on 12 August 1777.

The fact that Goya was able to paint his cartoons without the tutelage of Francisco Bayeu has been appreciated, although the first paintings in the series show some flaws, as in the case of The Picnic, a cartoon with imaginative and varied colours that nevertheless shows great disorder in the composition. A study of the work suggests that Goya did not pay much attention to the details in order to avoid problems for the weavers, or else he chose to ignore them because he was unaware of what they meant.

A letter from Goya, dated 30 October 1776, reveals that the painter had obtained autonomy as a tapestry painter. In this document he encloses the description of The Picnic, and mentions that he had been helped by Mengs.

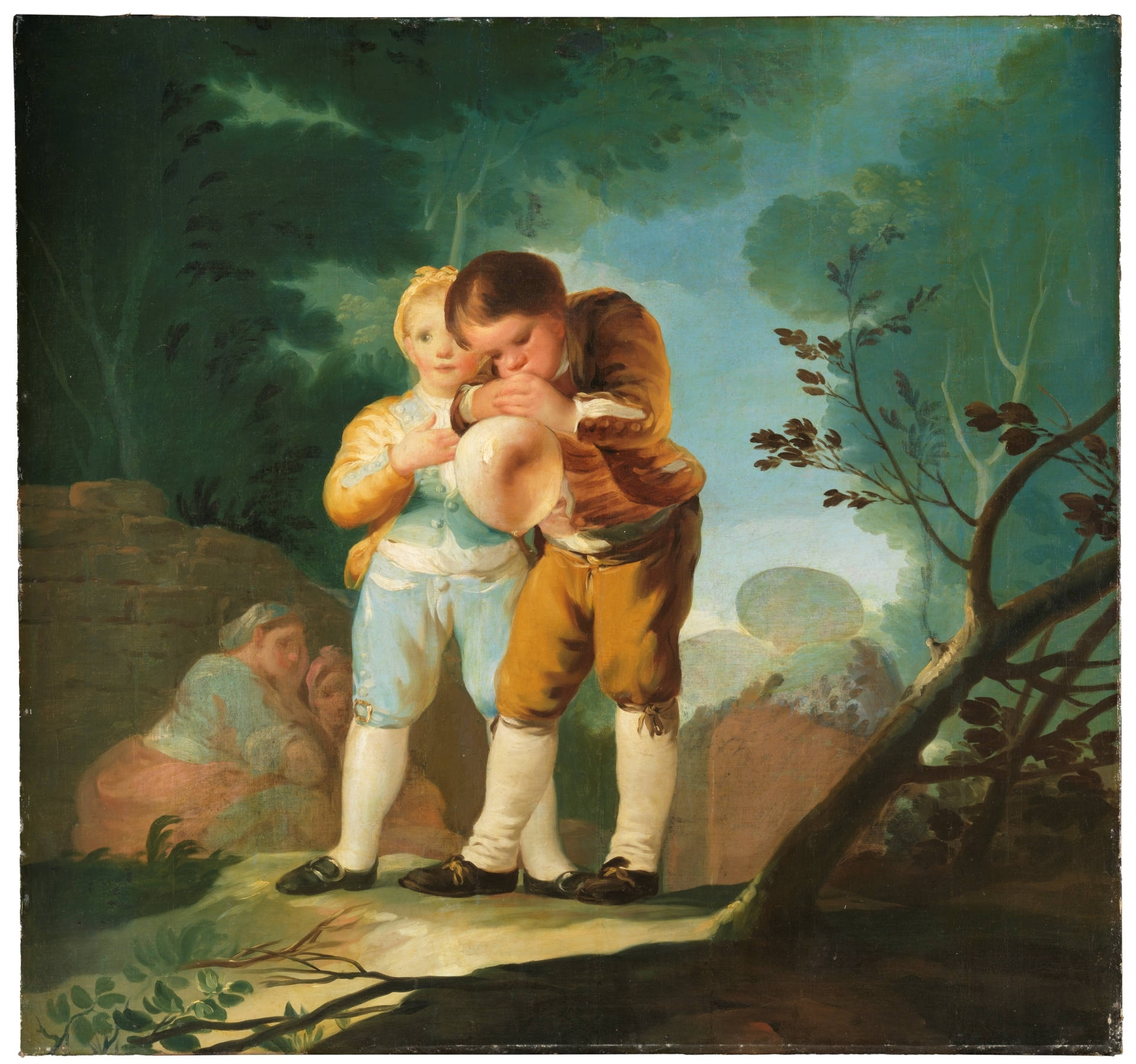
Children Blowing up a Bladder.

It can be said that the second series is closely related to the third and fourth, as all three capture the atmosphere in Madrid at the time. All three sets deal with popular and spontaneous themes, which are not without freshness either. But Goya was unable to develop his artistic genius freely. Although he got rid of Bayeu, the factory maintained strict guidelines regarding the themes for the production of cartoons.

The painter completely distanced himself from the hunting diversions imposed on him by his brother-in-law. The paintings in the second series express a compromise in terms of the weaver's needs, as simple compositions, light colours and good lighting would allow for better weaving. The series deals with majos, petimetras and gypsies, and distinguishes more complex subjects undertaken with clear outlines and explicitly rigid figures. The Aragonese artist identifies several of the majos in his cartoons in the series as inhabitants of the various Spanish provinces. For example, in Quarrel in the New Tavern, Goya describes one of the men involved in the brawl as "a Murcian".

Bozal and other authors specialising in Goya's painting consider The Parasol to be the most successful work in this series, as it combines the pyramidal art of Neoclassicism with the chromatic effects of the emerging galant style.

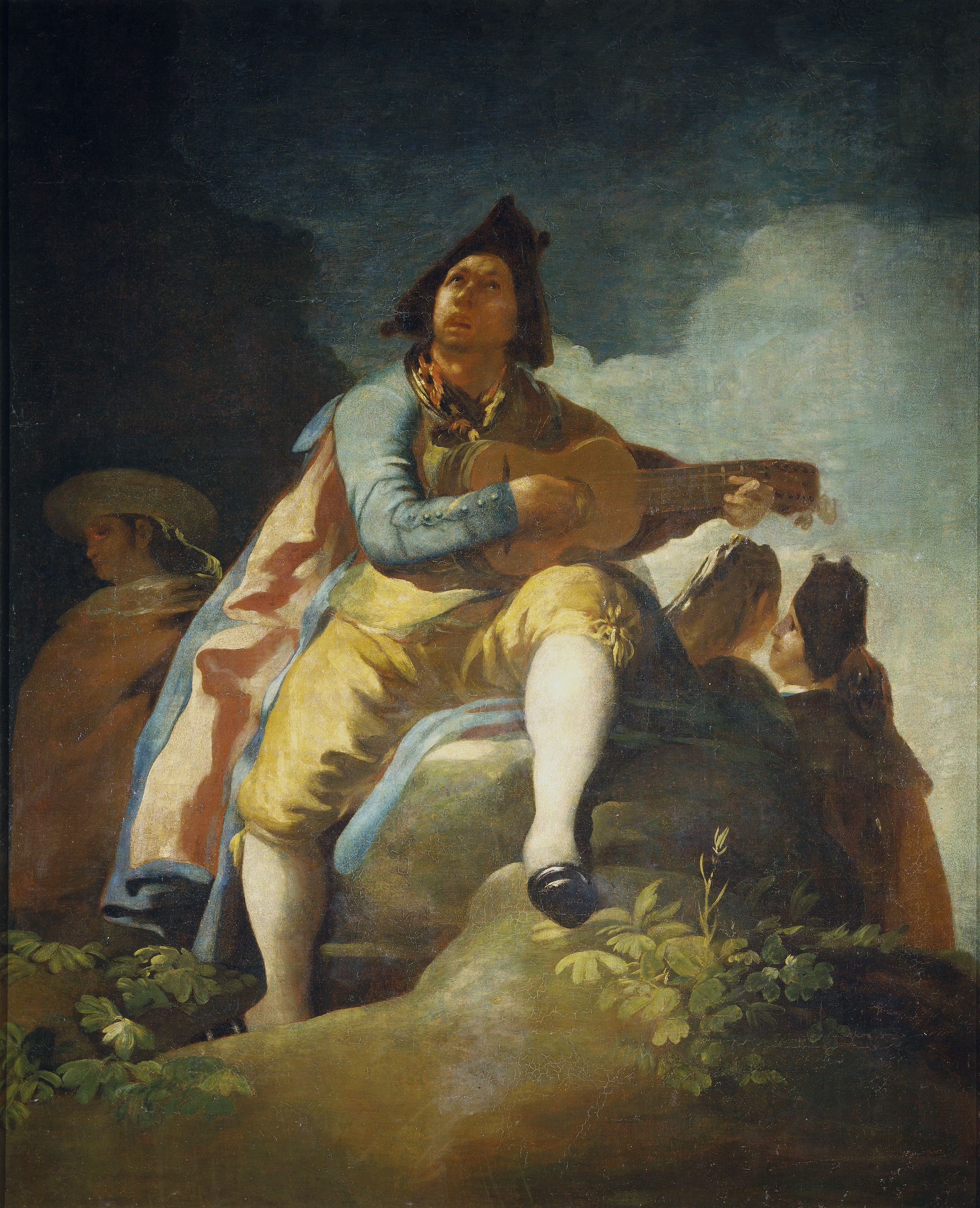
Majo with Guitar.

==== Third series (1778–1779) ====
In October 1777 Goya completed his second series. It was such a success that he was commissioned to undertake a third series for the antedormitory of the Prince and Princess of Asturias in El Pardo. He returned to popular themes, but now focused on the themes of the Madrid fair. The audiences between the painter and the princes Charles and Maria Luisa in 1779 were fruitful in the sense that they enabled Goya to continue his career at court. Now that they had become kings, the other princes became prominent promoters of the Aragonese painter.

On 4 January 1779 Goya gave the factory The Fair of Madrid, The Haw Seller, The Pottery Vendor and The Military Man and the Lady. Tomlinson assumes that this record is incomplete, as the overdoors are omitted as they are considered less important. Other paintings in the series, sent to the factory shortly afterwards, are Children in a Chariot, The Blind Guitarist, Boys Playing Soldiers and Majo with Guitar.

Once again Goya achieved overwhelming success. Proof of this is the fact that he applied for the post of painter of the chamber on the death of Mengs, but was refused. However, he had already managed to win the sympathy of the princes.

His palette adopts varied, earthy contrasts, the subtlety of which enables him to highlight the most important figures in the painting. Goya's technique is reminiscent of Velázquez, whose portraits Goya was reproducing in his early etchings.

Detailed descriptions of this series have made it possible to reconstruct how the tapestries were laid out in El Pardo. Goya relates in his correspondence that the series was intended to be hung clockwise in the antedormitory. If this had been the case, The Blind Guitarist would have been on the north wall, but when it was rejected by the tapestry makers, its place was taken by A Stickball Game. The east and west walls would be decorated with The Pottery Vendor and The Fair of Madrid, the largest panels in the series, and also with the overdoors Children in a Chariot and Boys Playing Soldiers. Finally, the south wall would be decorated with The Haw Seller and Military Man and the Lady.

Goya's artistic growth is already evident. In this group of paintings, devoted entirely to the country and populist tastes of the princes, he had the opportunity to demonstrate that he no longer needed any supervision. On the other hand, two of his most successful works, The Pottery Vendor and The Fair of Madrid, not only from this series but from the cartoons in general, are overflowing with naturalness. The figures appear more human and natural, and not attached to the rigid Baroque or to a budding Neoclassicism, but to a more eclectic painting.

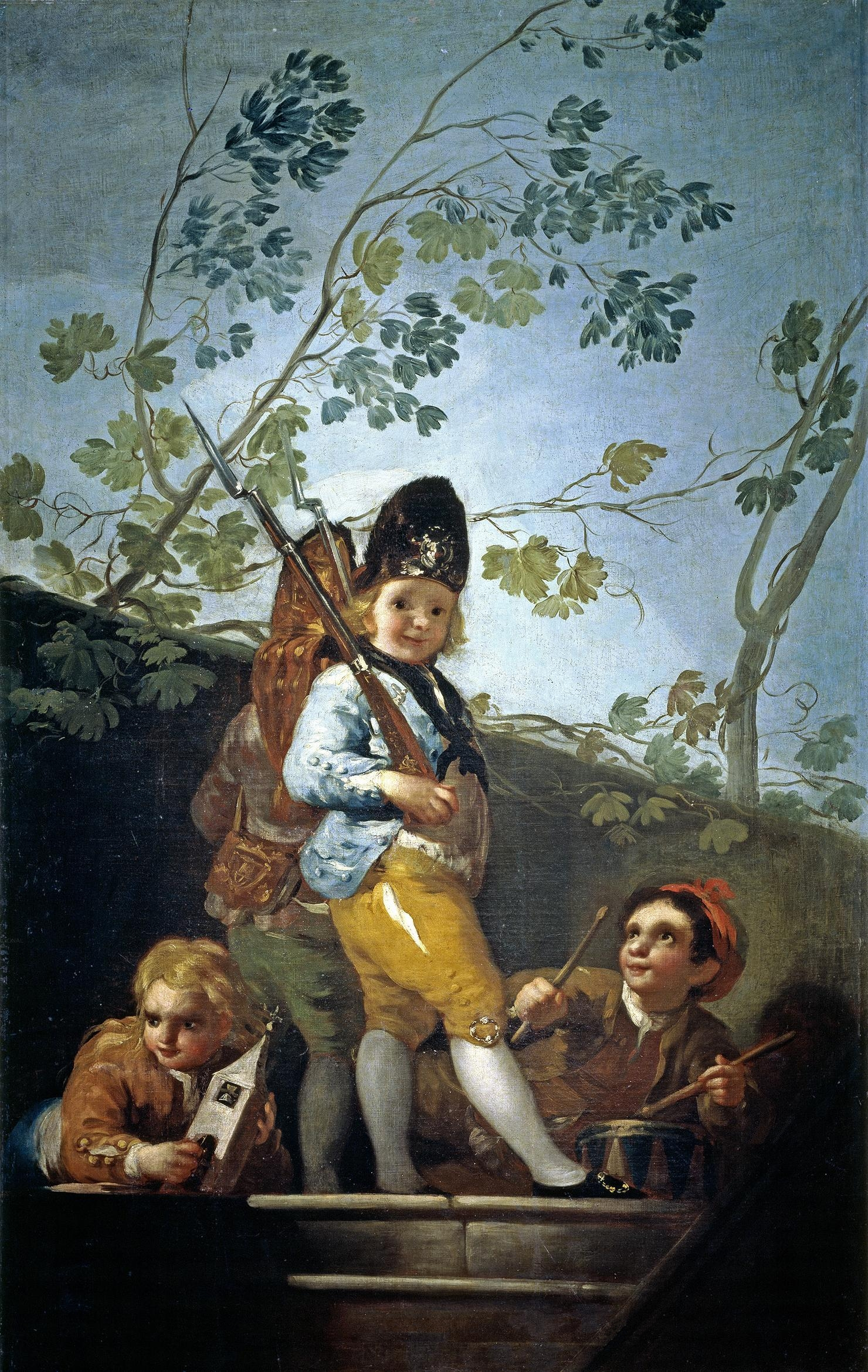
Children Playing Soldiers.

The landscape, which Goya used to draw with great care and attention to every aspect, becomes a problem in the weaving. The tapestry weavers cannot fully develop the minutiae that Goya designed. Above all, it is difficult to trace the outlines with the utmost clarity. The conflict led to the return of The Blind Guitarist, and Goya found the solution by painting A Stickball Game, which was to be hung in the bedroom and thus form part of the fourth series.

The themes of the third series are varied. Flirtation can be found in The Haw Seller and Military Man and the Lady; childish candour in Children Playing Soldiers and Children in a Chariot; popular scenes of the capital in The Fair of Madrid, The Blind Guitarist, Majo with Guitar and The Pottery Vendor. The last two works in the series are difficult to classify, such as The Swing and A Stickball Game. The hidden meaning is also present in several paintings, as The Fair of Madrid is a disguised criticism of the high society of the time.

Critics have described The Pottery Vendor as one of the strongest works in the series, noting its use of tonal variation and detailed depiction of objects. The painting features a palette of coppery golds, greys, and blue tones in the sky. Its composition brings together figures from different social classes, reflecting developments in genre painting. Some assessments have also highlighted its dynamic composition in the context of Spanish painting.

==== Fourth series (1779–1780) ====
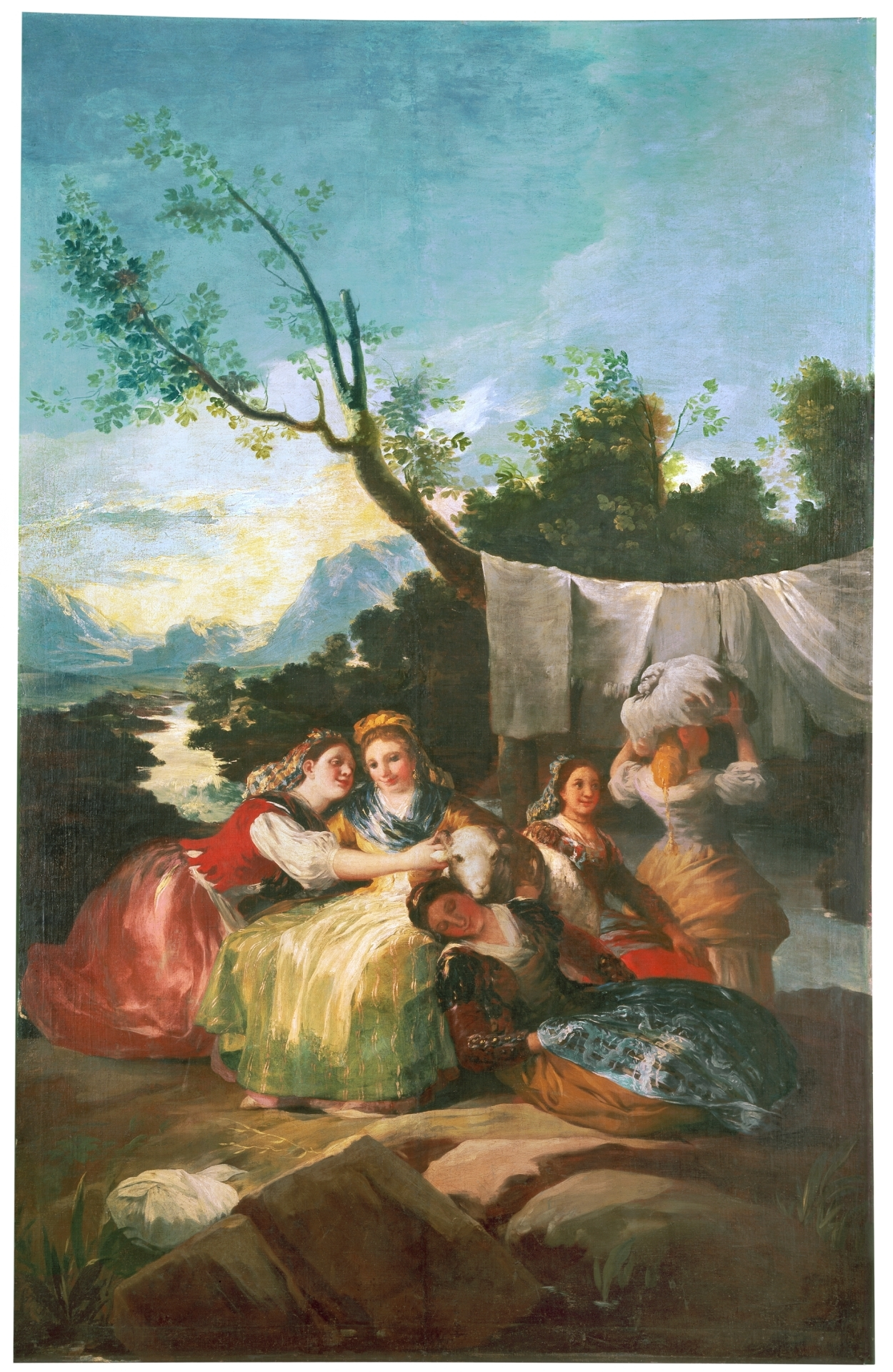
The Washerwomen, considered the archetype of femininity in 18th-century Spain.

Many authors, such as Mena, Bozal and Glendinning, consider the fourth series to be a continuation of the third, as it took place in the same palace at El Pardo. Tomlinson, however, points out that this set has different stylistic features from the previous one. It was intended for the bedroom of the Princes of Asturias in the aforementioned Palace of El Pardo.

Valentín de Sambricio and Gregorio Cruzada Villaamil were the first scholars to study tapestry cartoons. Both point out that the bedroom walls were not entirely adorned with Goya's tapestry cartoons, but that the princes used French furniture to complete the decoration. It could be conjectured that Goya's work may have been affected by this situation.

A document signed by Goya states that the series was undertaken between 1779 and 1780. The cartoons produced during this period are The Swing, A Stickball Game, The Rendezvous, The Tobacco Guards, The Washerwomen —the largest composition in the series, which was to establish the subjects to be treated in the rest—, The Young Bull, The Woodcutters, and the overpaintings Boy with a Bird and Boy and a Tree.

Unlike the third series, its successor was not so much influenced by the life of the majos as by scenes of a more rural nature derived from the second series.

Detailed descriptions by Goya have survived from this series, which are the main source for studying it. Despite this, it contains strong details that are only visible through careful observation. Once again, the sexual sense is developed in the characters of the series: in The Washerwomen, a woman caresses the animal's horns, a very clear phallic connotation. It should be recalled that the poor reputation of these workers had been a recurring theme in 18th-century literature and that in 1790 a royal decree prevented the washerwomen of the Manzanares from addressing middle-class citizens.

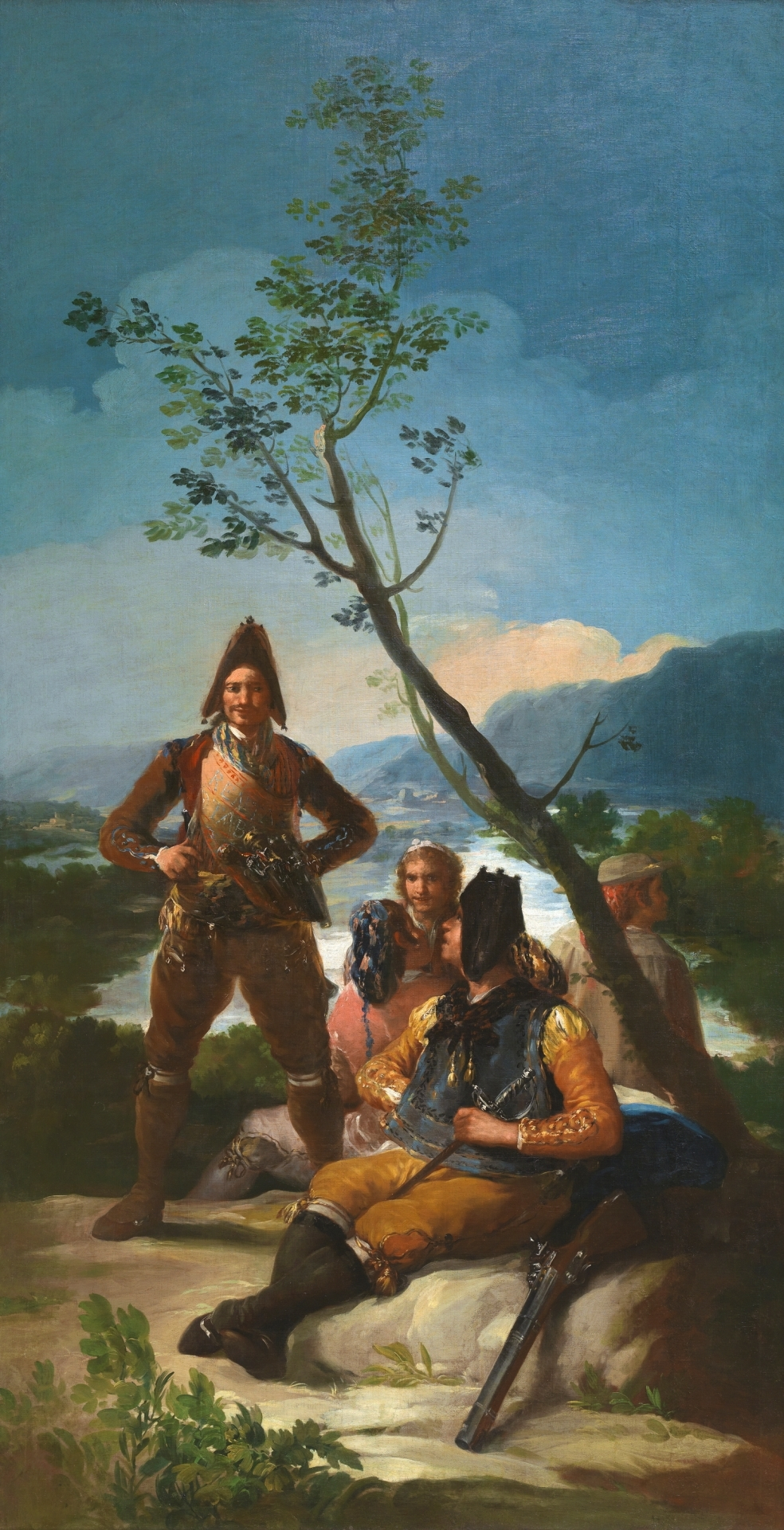
The Tobacco Guard, in which the guard is shown as a symbol of masculinity. Here Goya almost anticipates Impressionism.

The animal's horns again have an allusive meaning to the phallus in The Novillada, where a bullfighter has fun with a steer. The pelvis of the man in the foreground is framed by the animal. The phallic sense obtained from this situation is combined with that of The Washerwomen. Many critics have seen The Young Bull as a self-portrait of Goya, who was also a great bullfighting enthusiast.

The female counterparts to these paintings are The Washerwomen and The Swing. The immense game of flirtation drawn by Goya is completed by the largest piece in the series and the one that contains the most sexual mysteries, A Stickball Game. This painting contains a strong sexual message that can only be deciphered by comparing it with others in the same room. It is unheard of that such a puritanical monarch as Charles III —who tried to destroy the Hapsburg nude collection— could have allowed such a strong sexual message to remain in his palace, but most authors believe that this was because few realised the true meaning of the painting.

In The Tobacco Guard an allegory of virility can be discerned, as, like The Young Bull, it was placed in front of paintings with feminine themes. In this specific case, the guard dressed with pistols, swords and other weapons is a metaphor for manhood, which, in this situation, lies in the sword held between his legs.

The last two cartoons in the series were used as overdoors, The Fountain and The Dog, now in Patrimonio Nacional. The cartoons were lost in the 19th century and the only way to study them has been through Goya's descriptions. Tomlinson has argued that the tapestry makers deviated from Goya's original composition, so the resulting tapestries would not be a reliable vehicle for studying Goya's works.

The placement of the cartoons and the sense they made when viewed as a whole may have been a strategy devised by Goya so that his clients, Carlos and María Luisa, would be caught up in the wall-to-wall flirtation. The colours of his paintings repeat the chromatic range of the previous series, but now evolve into a greater use of the backgrounds and the faces of his characters.

Around this time, Goya began to stand out among court painters, who followed his example by depicting the customs of the people in their cartoons, but they were not as well received as those of the Aragonese painter.

In 1780 the supply of tapestries came to an abrupt halt. The war that the crown had waged with England to recover Gibraltar had caused serious damage to the kingdom's economy and unnecessary expenses had to be eliminated. Charles III temporarily suppressed the Royal Tapestry Factory, and Goya had to work in the private sector.

==== Fifth series (1786–1787) ====
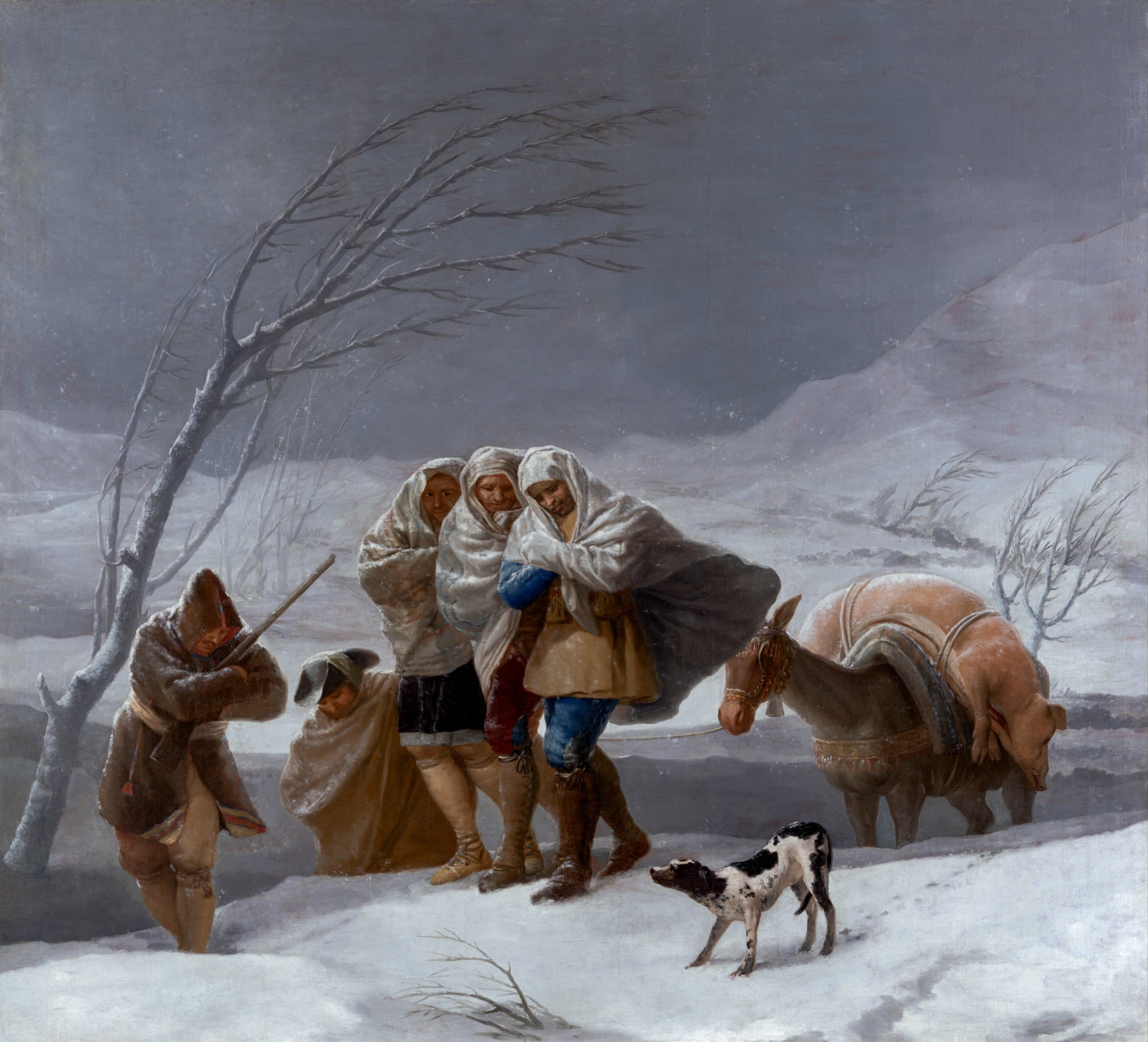
The Snowstorm.

In 1786, after work resumed at the Royal Factory, the Aragonese painter returned to painting cartoons. He was commissioned to paint a series for the dining room of the Princes of Asturias in El Pardo, described as "paintings of jocular and pleasant subjects needed for that site". Despite being identified as "the dining room", recent studies have established that it is the heir's living room, where he also ate.

For this series Goya tackled a theme with a long tradition in Western art: that of the four seasons. But this time the Aragonese painter put his own stamp on the paintings, turning the allegories into bucolic scenes representative of each period of the year. The theme of the periods of the year used to be the favourite theme of rococo and tapestry to decorate dining rooms.

But Charles III died unexpectedly on 14 December 1788, and the decorative programme that had been drawn up for El Pardo was left incomplete. The cartoons from this series, now transferred to tapestry, were sent to El Escorial, where they were used to decorate the walls of the monastery without a specific order.

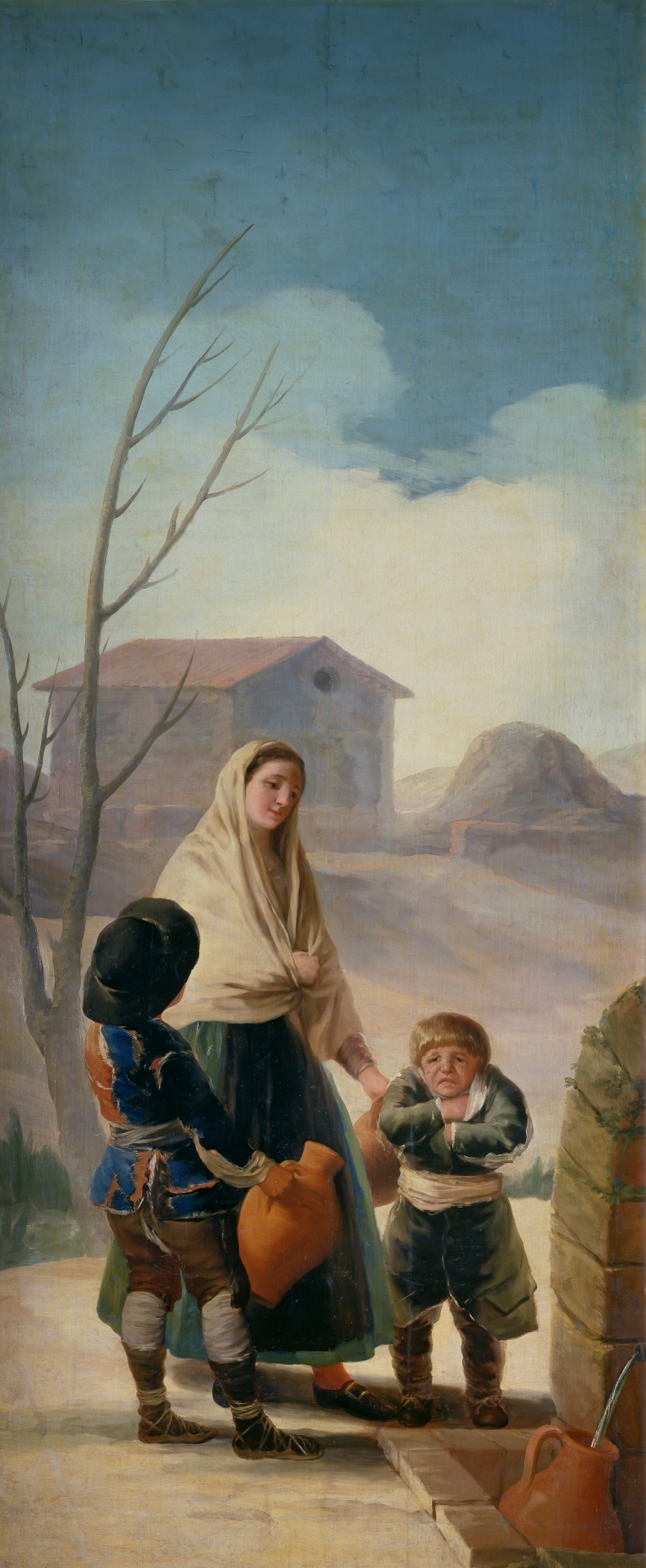
Poor People at the Fountain. Contains the same winter harshness as in The Snowfstorm. A sketch is in the Carmen Thyssen-Bornemisza Collection.

The cartoons in this series were Goya's first work at court after being appointed painter to the king in June 1786. On 12 September he sent a letter to Zapater in which he stated: "I am now very busy making sketches for a piece where the Prince is eating". Shortly afterwards he had to show them to the monarch, as at the end of the year he submitted an account of the expenses of "a coach to the Royal Site of El Escorial to present to His Majesty (may God preserve him) the Drafts for the Piece where the Prince eats in El Pardo".

The first part of the series deals with village life in a more traditional manner. Two of the paintings depict country activities (The Snowstorm and Summer) and two represent aristocratic customs rooted in the countryside (The Flower Girls and The Grape Harvest).

The Flower Girls demonstrates an unparalleled beauty. Summer rejects the traditional model of Ceres as an allegory of summer, and instead depicts a group of peasants resting and playing pranks on their companions. In The Grape Harvest, autumn is depicted as a traditional sale of fruit and other country delicacies, with a touch of elegance provided by the finely dressed woman on the left and the little boy trying to pick the fruit. Here again, Goya provides another magnificent depiction of childhood. Finally, The Snowstorm is the most studied cartoon in the series and Goya's first work with a markedly realistic character, as evidenced by the peasants suffering the harshness of winter.

The same dose of verism that Goya applied to The Snowstorm is repeated in The Injured Mason. Originally designed as a satirical painting —his sketch was The Drunk Mason—, Goya unexpectedly changed the direction of the work, and now paints a wounded mason being held up by his companions. The pain of the working classes depicted in The Wounded Bricklayer is matched by the misery radiated in Poor People at the Fountain.

It is these three paintings that depict pain in its best-known facets. In fact, it is thought that the woman and children in Poor People at the Fountain are the family of the injured worker in The Injured Mason, as they were close to each other in the dining room. In the same vein is The Snowstorm or The Winter, but here he portrays the harshness of winter attacking defenceless peasants.

Other paintings in the series are Boys with Mastiffs, a possible allegory of Gemini, according to Tomlinson; Boy on a Ram, a companion piece to the previous one; Cat Fight, a window shutter for the dining room, whose authorship is doubtful; Magpie in a Tree, a large painting reminiscent of Boy with a Bird and Boy and a Tree. Finally, the last two works in the series are Shepherd Playing a Pipe and its companion piece Hunter by a Spring, echoes of the series of country and hunting scenes.

==== Sixth series (1787–1788) ====
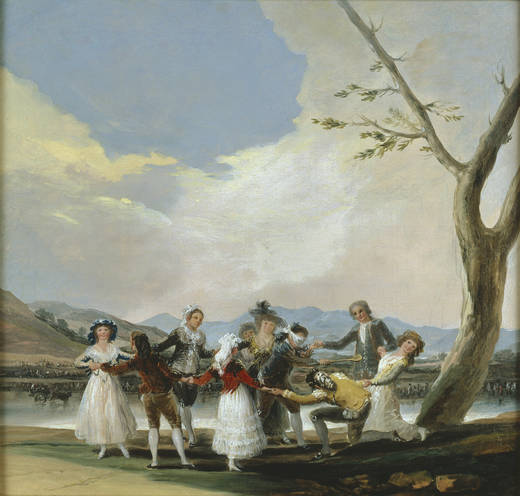
Sketch of Blind Man's Bluff. Along with The Drunk Mason, this is one of the most widespread and successful sketches of Goyaesque cartoons.

Once the decorative project for the Prince's dining room at El Pardo had been completed, the success achieved by Goya's work allowed the Aragonese to continue to participate in the next series, which would decorate the apartments of the daughters of the Princes of Asturias, the Infantas.

But King Charles III fell ill at the end of 1788 and died on 14 December of the same year. The work plan for El Pardo was left unfinished, and only the cartoon known as Blind Man's Bluff was made into a tapestry, the others remaining only as cartoons.

Tomlinson (2008) considers that if this series had been completed it would have been known as the most complex and well-done of Goya's previous works. However, despite the fact that it was never transferred to tapestry, it has been possible to study it in detail.

The first known record of this series dates from 31 May 1788. A few months earlier Goya had received the commission, and on that date he wrote to Zapater to announce that he had finished designing the cartoons and would soon begin work on them. Goya wrote that "the subjects are difficult and very laborious, such as that of The Meadow of San Isidro, on the day of the saint himself, with all the bustle that this court is accustomed to have".

As Goya stated in his letter to Zapater, the central scene of the series would have been The Meadow of San Isidro, which only remained as a small sketch measuring 44 x 94 cm. The painter states that he worked practically from life. This sketch is a magnificent preconception of what would become 19th century Impressionist painting. In the field of topography, Goya had masterfully depicted the architecture of Madrid, which appears here once again. The painter captures the two largest buildings of the time, the Royal Palace and the church of San Francisco el Grande. The village is depicted at the time of the joyful picnic on 15 May, the day of San Isidro Labrador, patron saint of the town of Madrid. Although the subject could lend itself to hidden erotic allegories, the Aragonese artist rejects them —unlike other paintings in the third and fourth series— and shows only a festive scene in a free, unconventional composition.

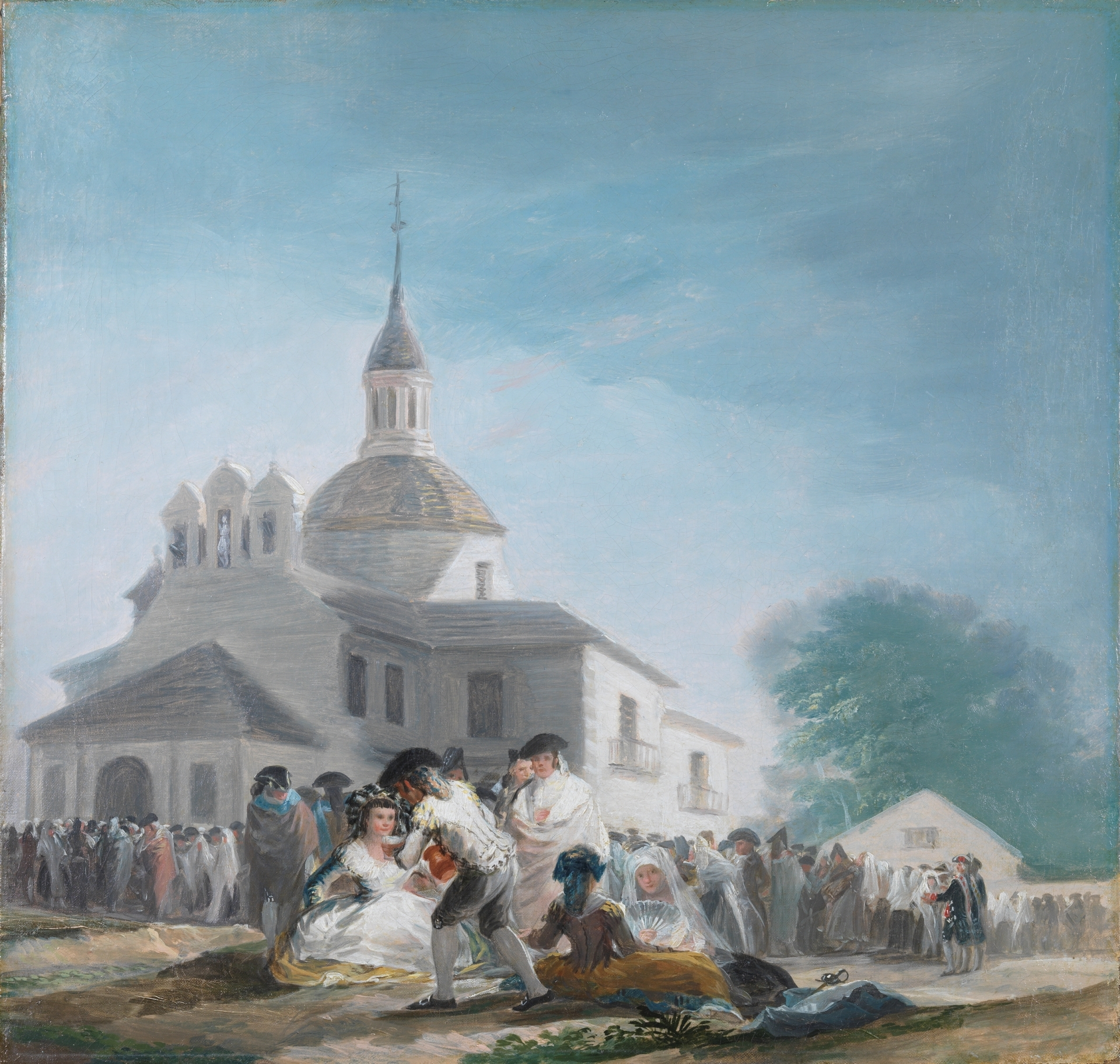
The Hermitage of Saint Isidore on the Saint's Feast Day, a painting representing the popular iconography of the verbena on the day of San Isidro Labrador.

One of the best known paintings in the series is Blind Man's Bluff, which did become a tapestry and was one of the most studied cartoons. It recreates the popular game of the same name, typical of the aristocracy and suitable for the daughters of princes. Some of the participants are dressed as majos and others in Parisian fashion. The mobility and dynamism of the painting makes the viewer believe that he can open the circle of participants. The fine handling of the light suggests an aristocratic bearing and the contrasts lead to a warm, familiar scene. One of the major differences between the sketch and the final tapestry is that in the first one a woman appeared outside the circle, possibly the partner of the man holding the ladle. For unknown reasons, Goya decided to remove this figure from the resulting cartoon.

The Hermitage of Saint Isidore on the Saint's Feast Day again discusses the theme of the popular festival in Madrid, as did The Meadow of San Isidro. The two paintings are closely linked. In The Hermitage of Saint Isidore there is a marked dynamism and an almost perfect outline of the majestic chapel. Other paintings in the series are Country Picnic, in which Goya changes the stereotype of the picnic and transforms it into a painting in the neoclassical style; and Harassed Cat, an almost unknown sketch that has been forgotten by critics, despite its attractive backlighting and rapid brushstrokes.

==== Seventh series (1791–1792) ====
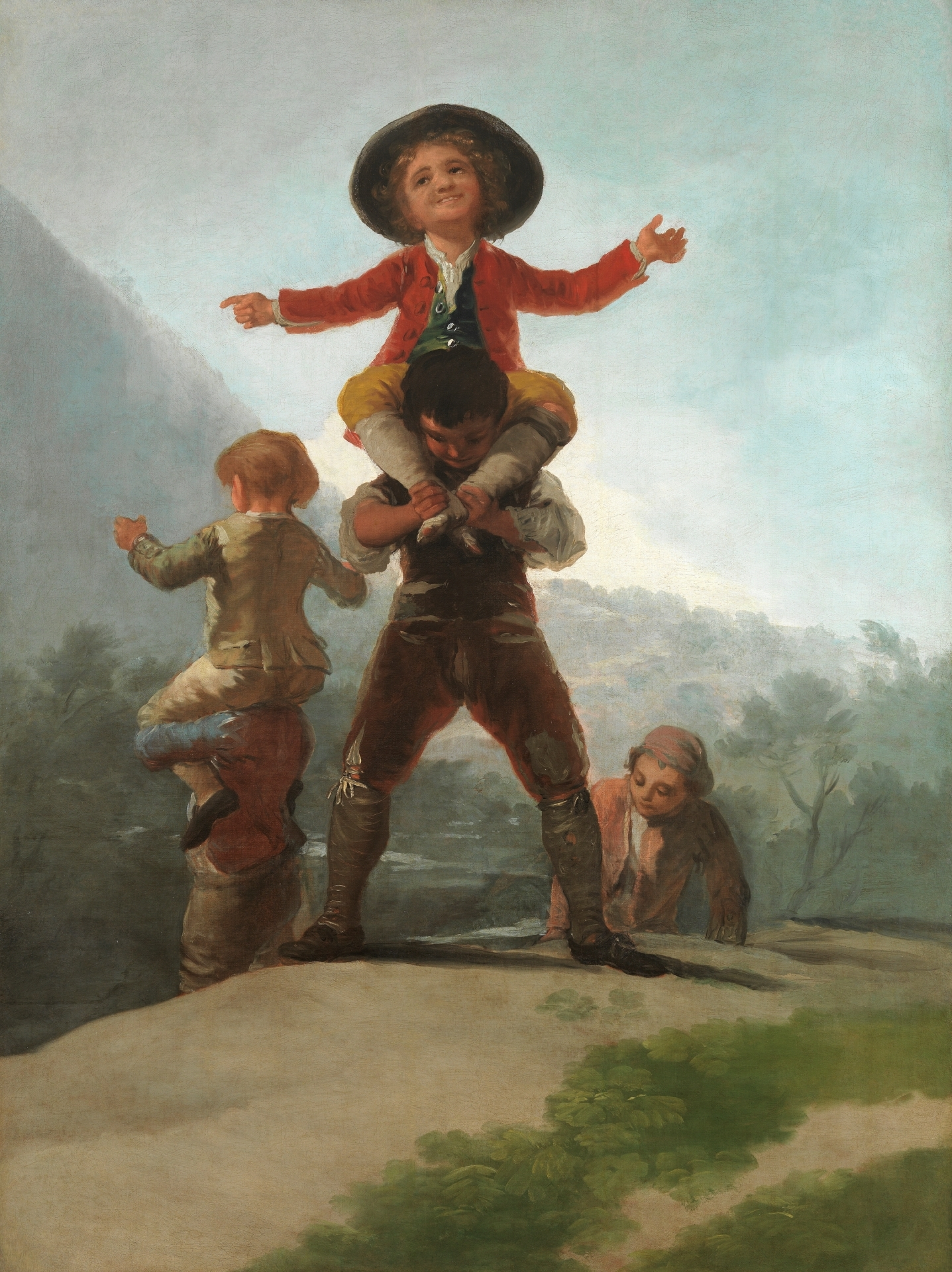
Chicken Fights.

Goya received the title of chamber painter after painting portraits of the new monarchs, Charles IV and Maria Luisa of Parma, heirs to the late Charles III. Now, aware of his new responsibilities, he rejected proposals to paint new series of cartoons.

El Escorial is now the favourite place of the kings, who have abandoned El Pardo. At that time, the making of tapestries for the second enclosure was suspended, although it was made clear that for other projects the Factory could allow "drawings to be made that would please, and in which good taste would shine through". And on 20 April 1790 the court painters received a communiqué stating that "the King has agreed to determine the rural and jocular scenes, which he wants to be represented in the tapestries".

Goya was on the list of artists who were to paint cartoons to decorate El Escorial. However, the king's painter, who is now the king's court painter, initially refused to undertake another —in his opinion— tiresome series, as he considered it too much of a craft and believed he had split from the guild of cartonists. But the success of the first of the cartoons in what was to be his seventh series, Gossiping Women, a masterly account of a conversation between majas, encouraged Goya to continue.

He was assigned the cartoons to be hung in the royal office of the Monastery, and the king even threatened to suspend Goya's salary if he refused to collaborate. But shortly afterwards he travelled to Andalusia, where he became seriously ill and even died, leaving the series incomplete according to plan: only seven of the twelve cartoons planned were completed.

In addition to Gossiping Women, the paintings in the series include Chicken Fights, a playful children's game alluding to the change of ministers; The Stilts, an allegory of the harshness of life; The Wedding, a scathing criticism of arranged marriages; and Young Women with Pitchers, a painting that has been interpreted in various ways, as an allegory of the four ages of man or of the majas and celestinas, but no consensus has been reached; Boys Climbing a Tree, a foreshortened composition that cannot avoid comparison with Boys Picking Fruit, from the second series; and The Straw Manikin, Goya's last tapestry cartoon, which symbolises the implicit domination of women over men, with evident carnivalesque overtones of an atrocious game in which women rejoice in manipulating a man.

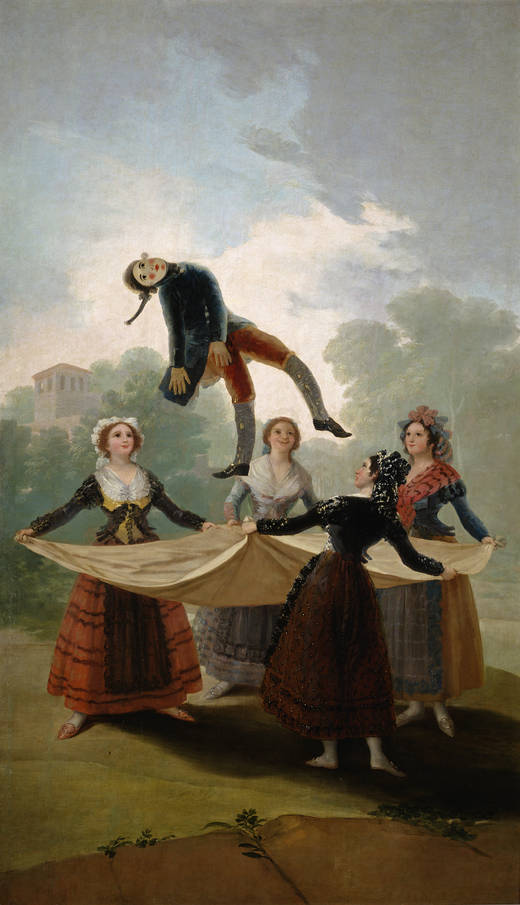
The Straw Manikin.

This series is often considered to be the most ironic and critical of the society of the time. Goya may have been influenced by political themes —the French Revolution was at its height—. In Chicken Fights, for example, the children going up and down are a disguised sarcasm on the volatile situation of the government, reflected in the periodic change of ministers.

All the paintings are quite different in size, and Young Women with Pitchers is one of the longest pieces. They are also very different in the way they capture reality, but satire is the common denominator of the whole series. As in all the previous series, with the possible exception of the third —set in Madrid— the rural and country atmosphere prevails over the urban.

The fact that this is a cheerful facet of Spanish society does not exempt the paintings from fierce criticism of the government, although Goya's position means that he has to disguise it in order to prevent his emoluments from diminishing. The open-air games played by young men, boys and women are a perfect setting for Goya's covert criticisms.

The Wedding is the best known and most accomplished painting in this series. Once again, the radiant childhood, so common in Goya's work, appears in the figure of the boy on the left. The village priest and the old man who opens his arms, possibly the bride's father, stand out. The woman's beauty belies the ugliness of her future husband, although he may be "a good match". Goya's fearlessness in capturing the facial and characterological expressions of the figures in his paintings is confirmed here. In short, it is a joyful procession of people marching with a strong sense of irony.

== Fate ==
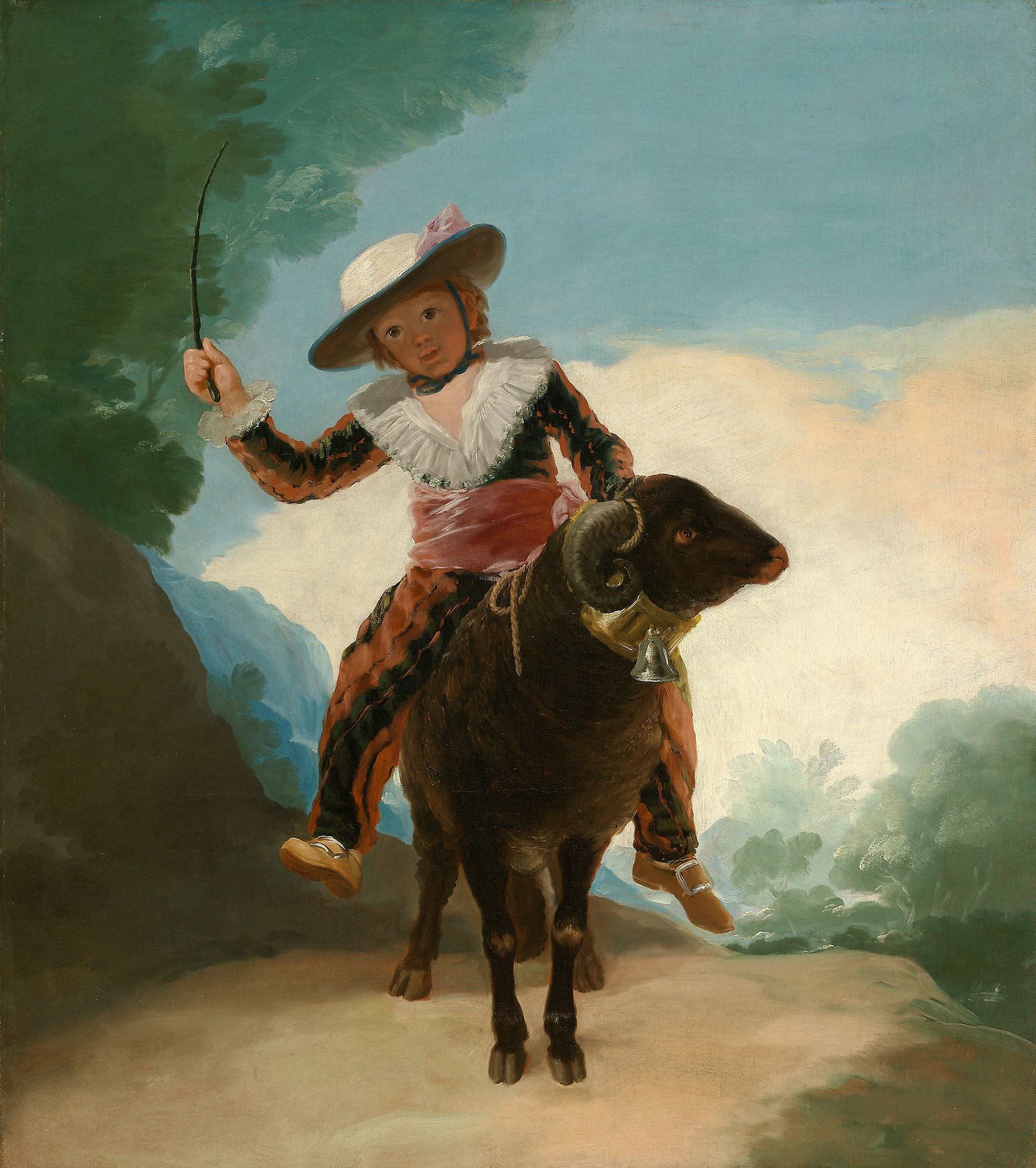
Boy on a Ram.

When the tapestry was finished, it was placed in its assigned place in the room previously agreed upon. Tomlinson notes that the series made between 1787 and 1792 (fifth, sixth and seventh) were never hung as detailed in the factory plan.

The vast majority of the cartoons were stored in one of the basements of the Royal Factory. During the War of Independence, the antique dealer Livinio Stuyck made an inventory of one hundred large cartons, twenty-seven small ones and sixty-six cartons for shutters or over doors. The general archive records that the main authors were Goya, Bayeu and Antonio González Velázquez.

In 1858 a large number of Goya's cartoons were moved to the basement of the Royal Palace in Madrid, where they remained until 1870, when Gregorio Cruzada discovered them and took them to the Museo del Prado. They first appeared in the Prado's catalogue in 1876.

On 19 January of that year the following cartoons were reported stolen: Dogs on a Leash, Majo with Guitar, Chicken Fights, Children in a Chariot, The Doctor and The Sew-Saw. The last three pieces are among the very few cartoons that are not in the Prado Museum.

This prompted Cruzada to publicise the cartoons, which were soon well received in Spanish art circles. The Museo del Prado, the institution that inherited the royal collections, has received almost forty of the cartoons. For their part, most of the final tapestries are still in their original locations, such as El Pardo and El Escorial.

The vast majority of Goya's preparatory sketches for his cartoons, such as those for the sixth series and The Threshing Floor —a sketch of The Summer—, were sold to the Duke and Duchess of Osuna, the artist's patron, in 1799. In 1896, his heirs auctioned the works. The family of the Spanish nobleman Pedro Fernández Durán y Bernaldo de Quiraldós acquired some of them, such as The Drunk Mason. At this auction the Prado acquired The Meadow of San Isidro, Blind Man's Bluff and The Hermitage of San Isidro, all preparatory canvases for the Aragonese artist's cartoons. On Fernández Durán's death in 1931, his will stated that his entire collection of paintings would be transferred to the Museo del Prado. On the other hand, some collectors, such as José Lázaro Galdiano and several American businessmen, bought cartons such as Boy on a Ram and Picnic in the Country Picnic.

Between 1984 and 1987, six cartoons by Goya, including The Cats and Hunter by a Spring, were discovered in the cellars of the Prado Museum. They are believed to have been housed there by Sambricio more than a hundred years ago.

As for the study of the work, the first historiographer to do so was Cruzada himself. In 1946, Valentín de Sambricio's study was published, which provided numerous documents for an in-depth knowledge of the situation of the paintings. It was in 1971 that Jutta Held's book appeared, which was innovative in that it analysed the paintings in depth through documents obtained from the archives of the Royal Factory. Together with Sambricio's work and the catalogue by Pierre Gassier and Juliet Wilson Bareau —which is not only limited to the cartoons but to Goya's entire oeuvre— it is the most complete catalogue of the tapestry cartoons.

A few years later, the first purely analytical studies began to appear. In the early 1980s, Nigel Glendinning and Fred Licht published their books Goya and His Critics (in Spanish: Goya y sus críticos) and Goya in Perspective, respectively. In 1989 the University of Cambridge published Janis Tomlinson's book on Goya's early years at court, translated into Spanish in 1993 as Francisco de Goya: los cartones para tapices y los comienzos de su carrera en la Corte de Madrid. Finally, in 2005, studies by Valeriano Bozal and Glendinning himself were published, covering the whole of Goya's life and work, but both devote an important chapter to the study of the cartoons.

== See also ==
- List of Francisco Goya's tapestry cartoons
- List of works by Francisco Goya
- La novillada

== Bibliography ==
- BOZAL, Valeriano (2005). Francisco Goya, vida y obra (in Spanish). Madrid: Tf. ISBN 978-84-96209-39-8.
- BUENDÍA, José Rogelio (2000). El Prado, colecciones de pintura (in Spanish). Bonn: Lunwerg. ISBN 84-7782-694-3.
- CIRLOT, Lourdes (2007). Museo del Prado (in Spanish). Vol. 7. Madrid: Espasa. ISBN 978-84-674-3810-9.
- GASSIER, Pierre; Wilson Bareau, Juliet (1974). Vida y obra de Francisco Goya (in Spanish). Barcelona: Juventud. ISBN 84-261-5682-7.
- GLENDINNING, Nigel (2005). Francisco de Goya (in Spanish). Madrid: Arlanza. ISBN 84-95503-40-9.
- HAGEN, Rose-Marie; Hagen, Rainer (2003). Francisco de Goya (in Spanish). Colonia: Taschen. ISBN 978-84-7090-399-1.
- MENA MÁRQUEZ, Manuela de (2008). Goya: guía de sala (in Spanish). Madrid: Tf. ISBN 978-84-95452-46-7.
- RAPELLI, Paola (1997). Goya (in Spanish). Madrid: Electa. ISBN 84-8156-180-0.
- TOMLINSON, Janis (1993). Francisco de Goya: los cartones para tapices y los comienzos de su carrera en la Corte de Madrid (in Spanish). Madrid: Cátedra. ISBN 84-376-1192-X.
- —, "Cartones para tapices". Enciclopedia del Museo del Prado (in Spanish). 2008.
- TRIADÓ TUR, Juan Ramón (2000). Goya (in Spanish). Barcelona: Susaeta. ISBN 84-305-9689-5.
