= Master of Hoogstraeten =

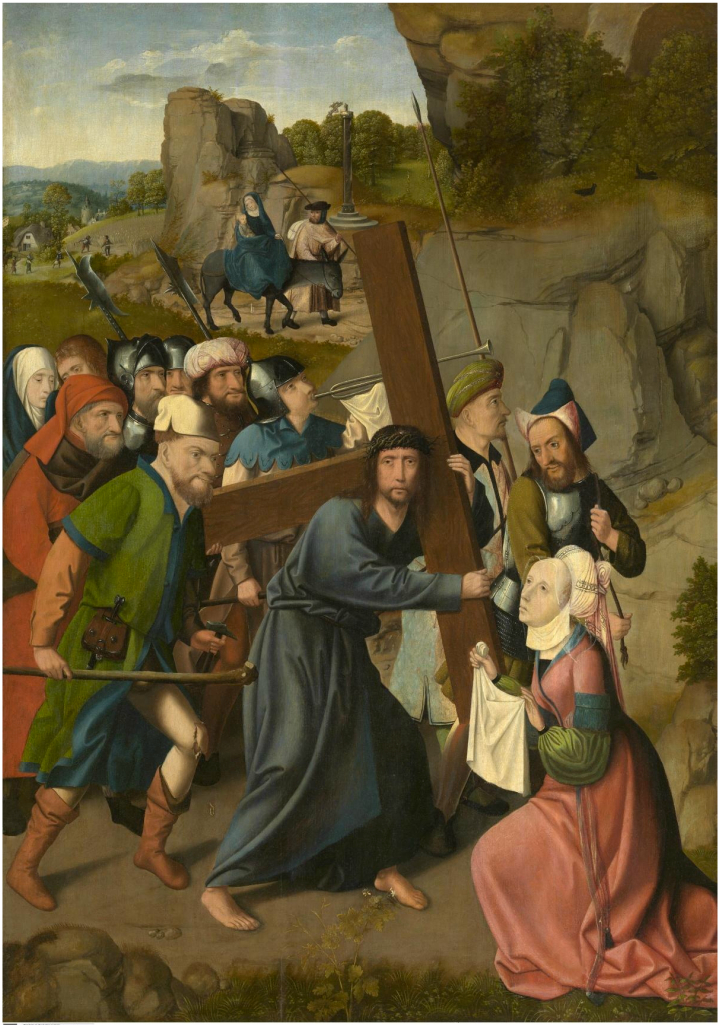
The Bearing of the Cross

The Master of Hoogstraeten (c. 1475 – c. 1530) is the Notname given to a Flemish painter or a collective of painters active in Antwerp in the early 16th century. The master created principally religious paintings and is considered a member of the Antwerp Mannerists.

== Identification ==
The identity of the Master is not known, although attempts have been made to link him with Passchier van der Mersch, a Flemish painter who was a pupil of the leading Antwerp painter Hans Memling. Because of a clear Dutch influence on his work, it has also been surmised that the Master was in fact originally from the Northern Netherlands.

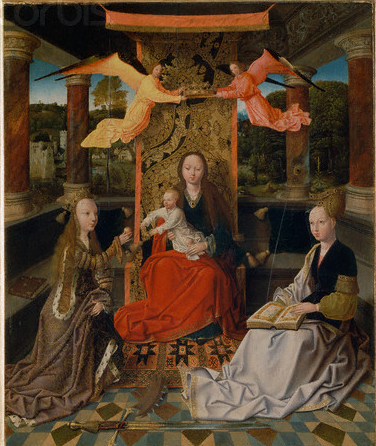
Virgin and Child with Saints

The notname Master of Hoogstraeten was coined by the historian of Early Netherlandish art Max Jakob Friedländer after a set of seven panels each depicting one of the Sorrows of the Virgin that originally hung in the church of Saint Catharina in the town of Hoogstraten (now in the Antwerp province of Belgium). The panels believed to have been painted in 1505 remained in the church until the beginning of the 19th century and are now in the Royal Museum of Fine Arts Antwerp.

The Master may have been a pupil of Hans Memling himself, but his work also shows the influence of Flemish artists like Gerard David (1460–1523) and Hugo van der Goes (1440–1482). Madonna and Child with Saint Catherine of Alexandria and Saint Barbara, now in the Uffizi Gallery, was once attributed to Hugo van der Goes, but is now claimed to be a work of the Master of Hoogstraeten.

== Work ==
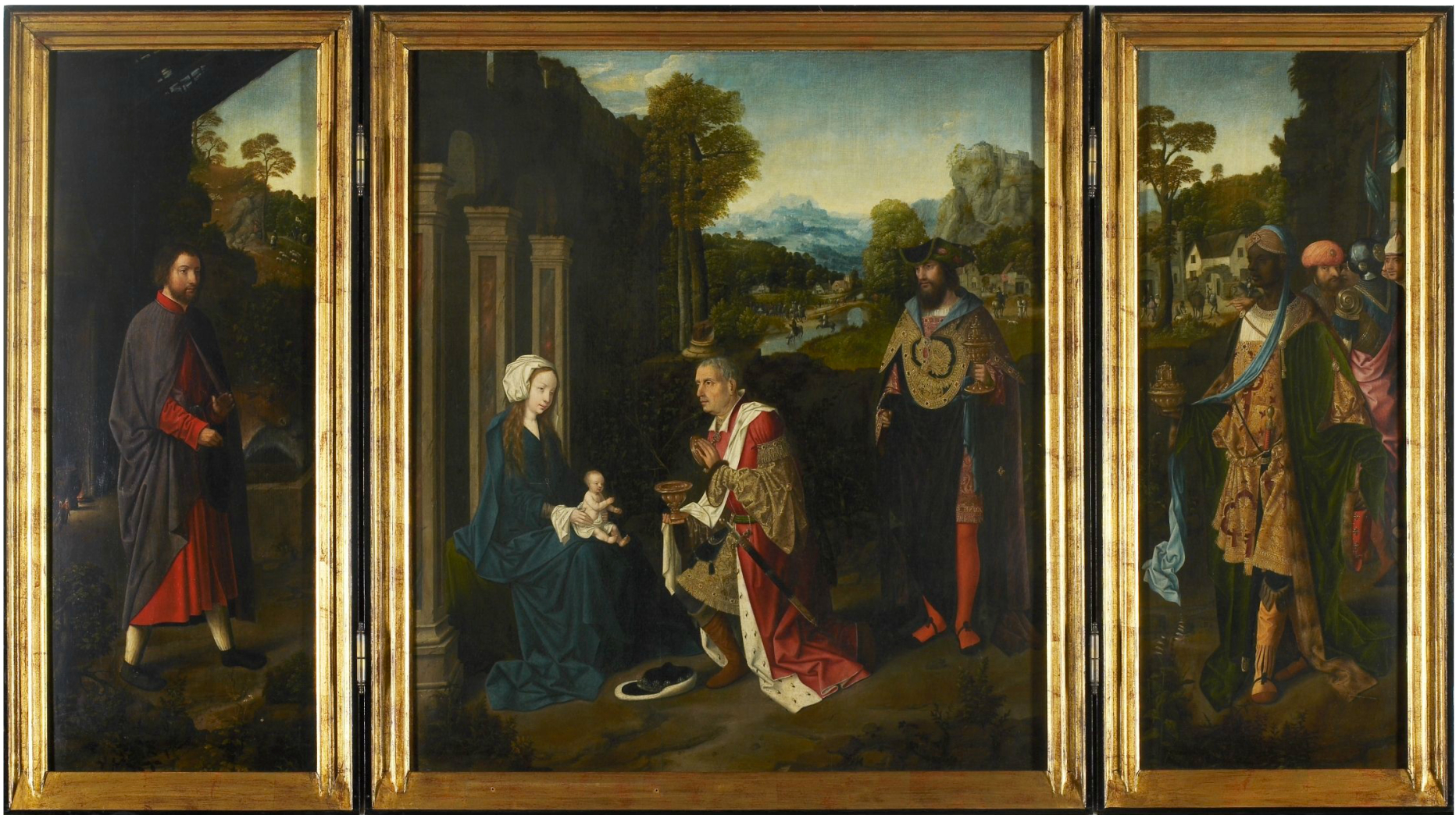
Adoration of the Magi

He is known for religious works.

The Antwerp Mannerists typically depicted religious themes, which they interpreted generally in a more superficial manner than the Flemish artists of the previous century in favour of a more fluid form and an abundance of meticulously rendered details. They also show a preference for a changing palette. Their compositions are typically shock-full with agitated figures in exotic, extravagant clothes. The compositions typically include architectural ruins. The architecture is initially Gothic but later Renaissance motifs become dominant. The earlier works included Gothic architecture but in later works Renaissance structures became prevalent. The paintings appear to combine Early Netherlandish and Northern Renaissance styles, and incorporate both Flemish and Italian traditions into the same compositions.

Most of the artists of Antwerp Mannerism have remained anonymous and only some of the artists have been identified. They include Jan de Beer, Adriaen van Overbeke and the Master of 1518 (possibly Jan Mertens or Jan van Dornicke). The anonymous Antwerp Mannerists have been given notnames based on external knowledge about the works such as an inscription, a previous owner, the place of preservation, former attributions or a date found on the work. This has led to names such as the Pseudo-Bles, the Master of the Von Groote Adoration, the Master of Amiens, the Master of the Antwerp Adoration and the Master of 1518. Works that cannot be attributed directly to a named master are attributed to Anonymous Antwerp Mannerist.

Many of the panels or triptychs produced by the Antwerp Mannerists depict scenes of the Nativity of Jesus, usually situated at night, the Adoration of the Magi and the Crucifixion. The theme of the Adoration of the Magi was in particular dear to them as it allowed the artists to give free rein to their preoccupation with ornament and the simulation and imitation of luxury products.
