= Master of the Von Groote Adoration =

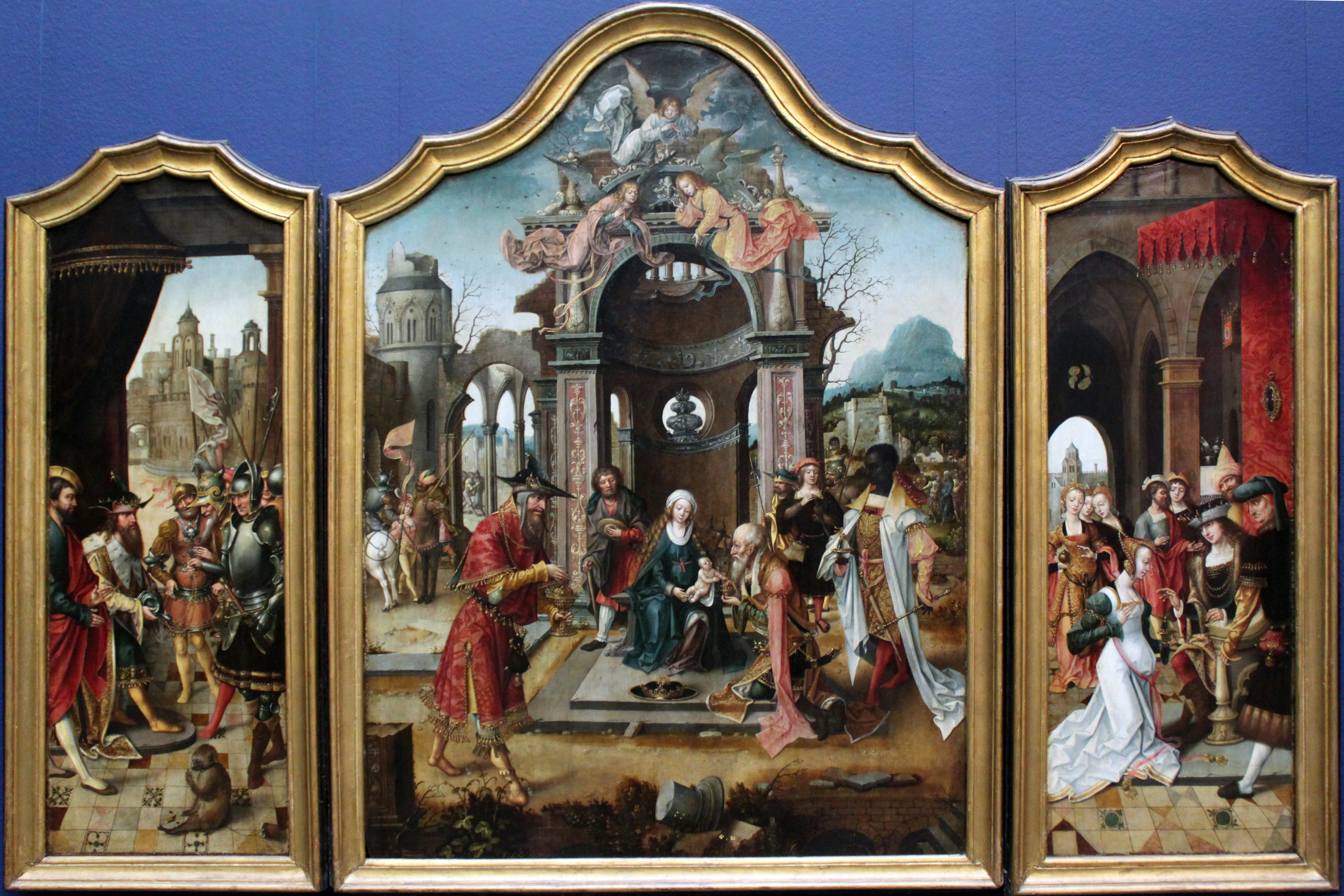
Adoration of the Magi

The Master of the Von Groote Adoration is a notname given to an artist or a number of artists or various workshops active in Antwerp sometime between 1500 and 1520. Whereas there are significant variations in the style of the works attributed to the master, the repetitions of certain subjects played an important role in the composition of the oeuvre. The master is considered a representative of the group of Antwerp mannerists who created works in an extravagant style in the early sixteenth century.

== Naming ==
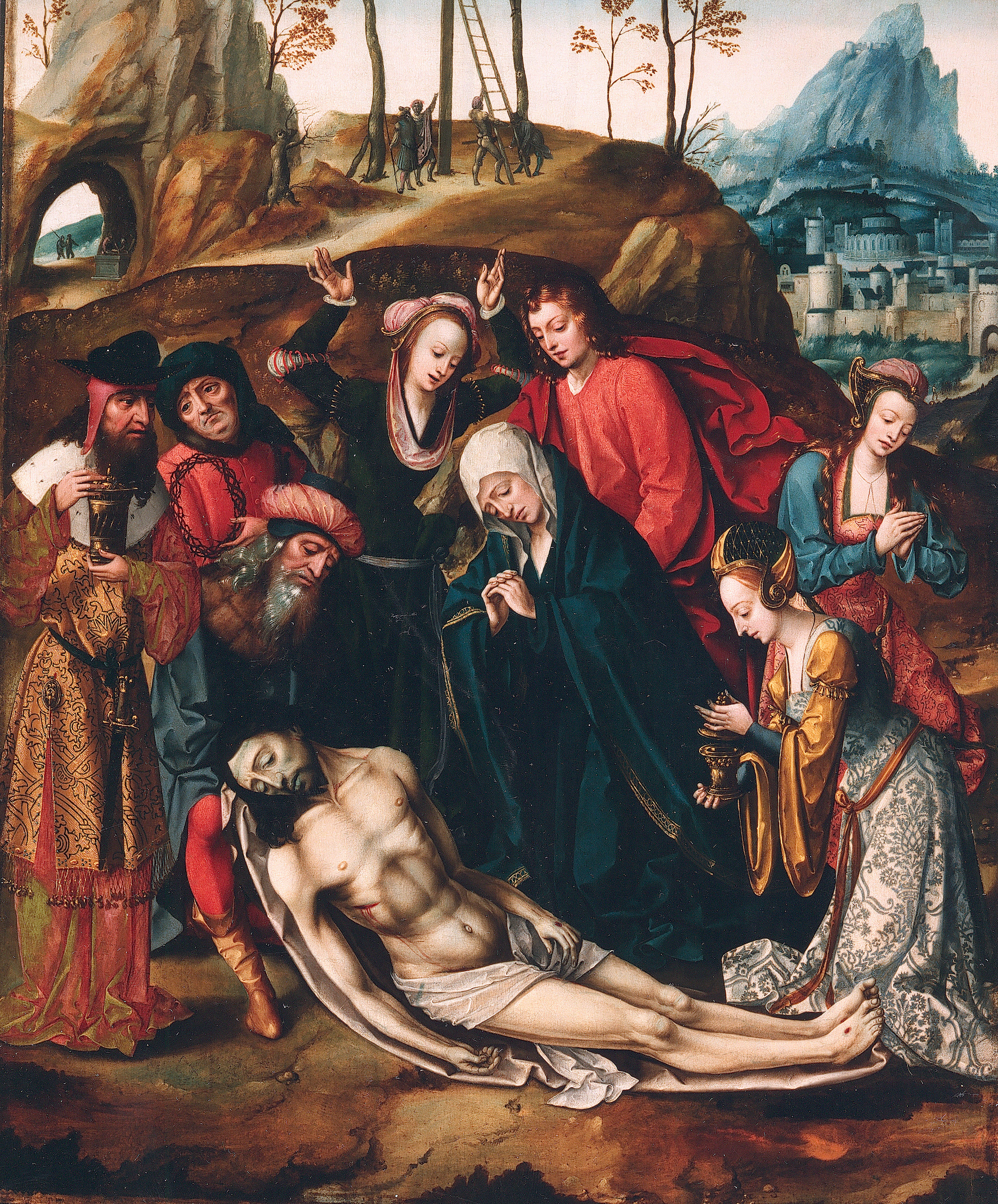
Lamentation of Christ

The master belonged to the group of Antwerp mannerists who got their notname from the art historian Max Jakob Friedländer when in 1915 he made an attempt to classify and attribute paintings that he deemed wrongly attributed to Herri met de Bles to a master or a workshop. The Master of the von Groote worship was the name given to the C group to which were assigned 19 works, of which 11 paintings 8 painted copies that fall stylistically outside the group.

The main work was a depiction of the Adoration of the Magi, then in the collection of Freiherr von Groote and now in the Städel Museum.

The style differences within the original group are significant, but the number of repetitions of the same theme, in particular that of the Adoration of the Magi was important when putting the group together.

== Style characteristics ==
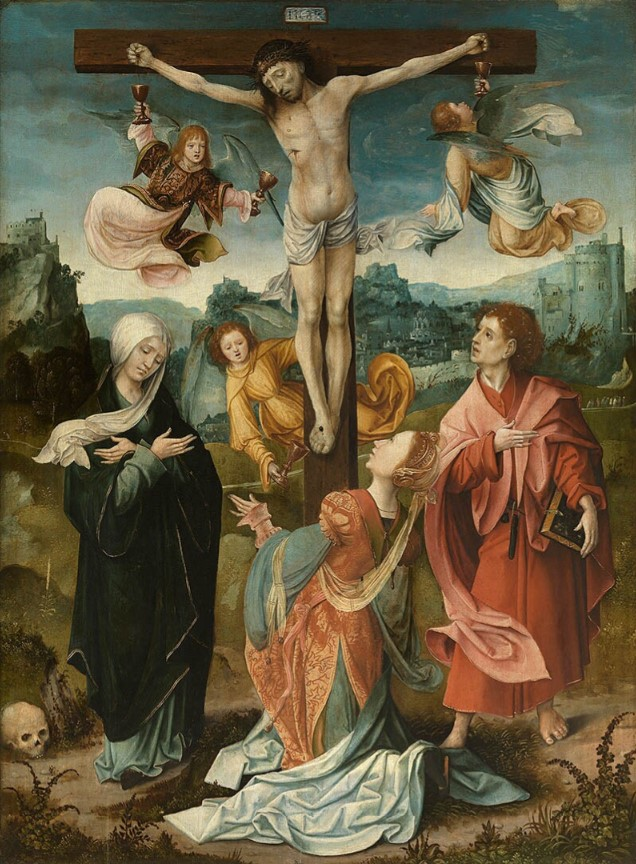
The crucifixion

The Master of the Von Groote Adoration is considered a representative of Antwerp Mannerism. The term Antwerp Mannerism was coined by Friedländer in the early 20th century to refer to a transitory phase in Netherlandish art from the late Gothic to works inspired by the Italian Renaissance. The terms "Manier" and "Manierist" were used by Friedländer to refer to the original even unusual motifs in the body of work categorized under this style. The terms carried a pejorative connotation as these works were regarded as inferior to work produced by Pieter Coecke van Aelst, Quentin Matsys and other contemporaries. The style of these works was often extravagant. This was reflected in how the folds of the flamboyant and exotic clothes worn by the figures defied gravity.

These figures were usually depicted in agitated poses amidst architectural ruins. The earlier works included Gothic architecture but in later works Renaissance structures became prevalent. The paintings appear to combine Early Netherlandish and Northern Renaissance styles, and incorporate both Flemish and Italian traditions into the same compositions. Most of the artists of Antwerp Mannerism have remained anonymous and only some of the artists have been identified. They include Jan de Beer, Adriaen van Overbeke and the Master of 1518 (possibly Jan Mertens or Jan van Dornicke).

Friedländer stated that the list of 19 works that he included in the body of work attributed to the Master of the Von Groote Adoration was not complete but showed sufficiently the characteristics of the master to which further attributions would not add anything. Friedländer did not detect an artist's personality in the group of works. He rather viewed the works as the product of a workshop relying on the same compositions and types. Friedländer had a negative view of the artistic value of the output of the master as he found his work tedious and unimaginative. In contrast to the first two groups of Antwerp Mannerists Friedländer identified, i.e. the Pseudo-Bles and the presumed Jan de Beer group, on which he heaped praise because of their originality, the Master of the Von Groote Adoration could not count on his appreciation. He regarded the Master as an uninspired follower of Pseudo-Bles and his work lacking liveliness and expression.

The works of the Master of the Von Groote Adoration and Friedländer's D-group referred to as the Master of the Antwerp Adoration are so close that he assumed that there had been a shared workshop. However, the first master is regarded as less imaginative and his figures seem more frozen.
