= Master of the Lille Adoration =

Early Netherlandish painter

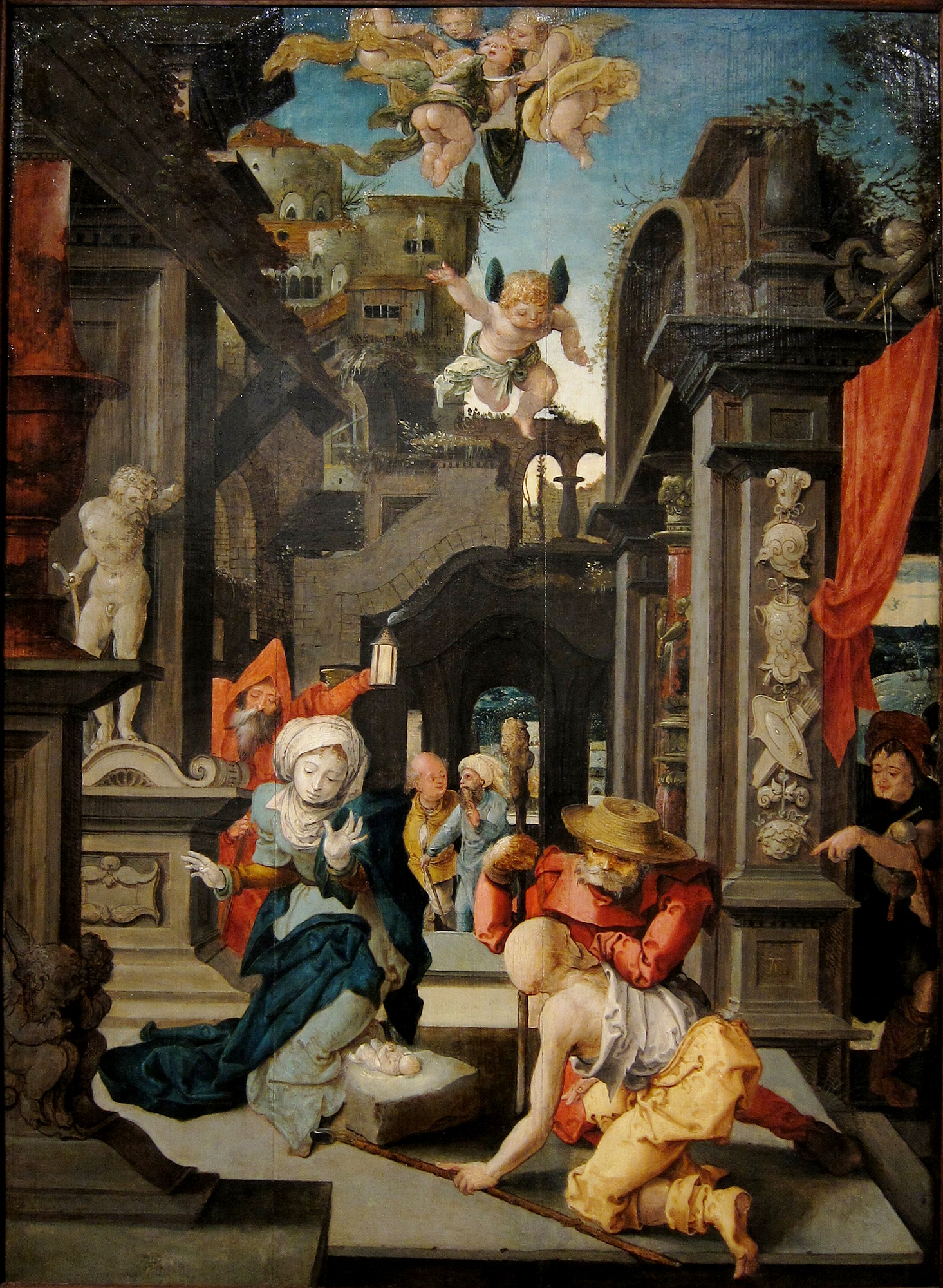
Adoration of the Shepherds, dated 1512, the "Lille Adoration"; 86 cm x 63.5 cm

The Master of the Lille Adoration (active c. 1510–1530), was an Early Netherlandish painter active in Antwerp, as one of the Antwerp Mannerists. He was first suggested as a distinct but unknown figure in 1995 in an article by Ellen Konowitz, a proposal which has been widely accepted. In 2014, Christie's gave his dates as "active Antwerp by c. 1523/35".

Most of the works the new master has now been "given" were previously attributed to Dirck Vellert, the leading Antwerp stained-glass maker of the day, on the assumption that he also painted. His notname comes from the Adoration of the Shepherds in the Palais des Beaux-Arts de Lille, "as the painting which perhaps best demonstrates his individual style". Until 1995 this was attributed to Vellert, who was clearly an influence.

As described by Konowicz, the master's works share the Antwerp Mannerists' "style characterized by an artificial elegance. Their paintings typically feature elongated figures posed in affected, twisting, postures, colorful ornate costumes, fluttering drapery, Italianate architecture decorated with grotesque ornament, and crowded groups of figures...". However, in both the master's works and Vellert's, the figures are in a different style "with a bulk and masculinity that is foreign to the slender, graceful figures" of the Mannerists.

Differences between the master and Vellert include the paintings' "depiction of tensely gesturing hands, often with palms turned outward and the fingers splayed", as in the Lille and Rotterdam pictures, a "trademark". The paintings show a "predeliction" for "grotesque, contorted heads", as in the kneeling Magus in Rotterdam. Other traits are a liking for a low viewpoint, small pieces of trompe-l'œil, and elements projecting over a ledge, such as the kneeling shepherd's foot at Lille.

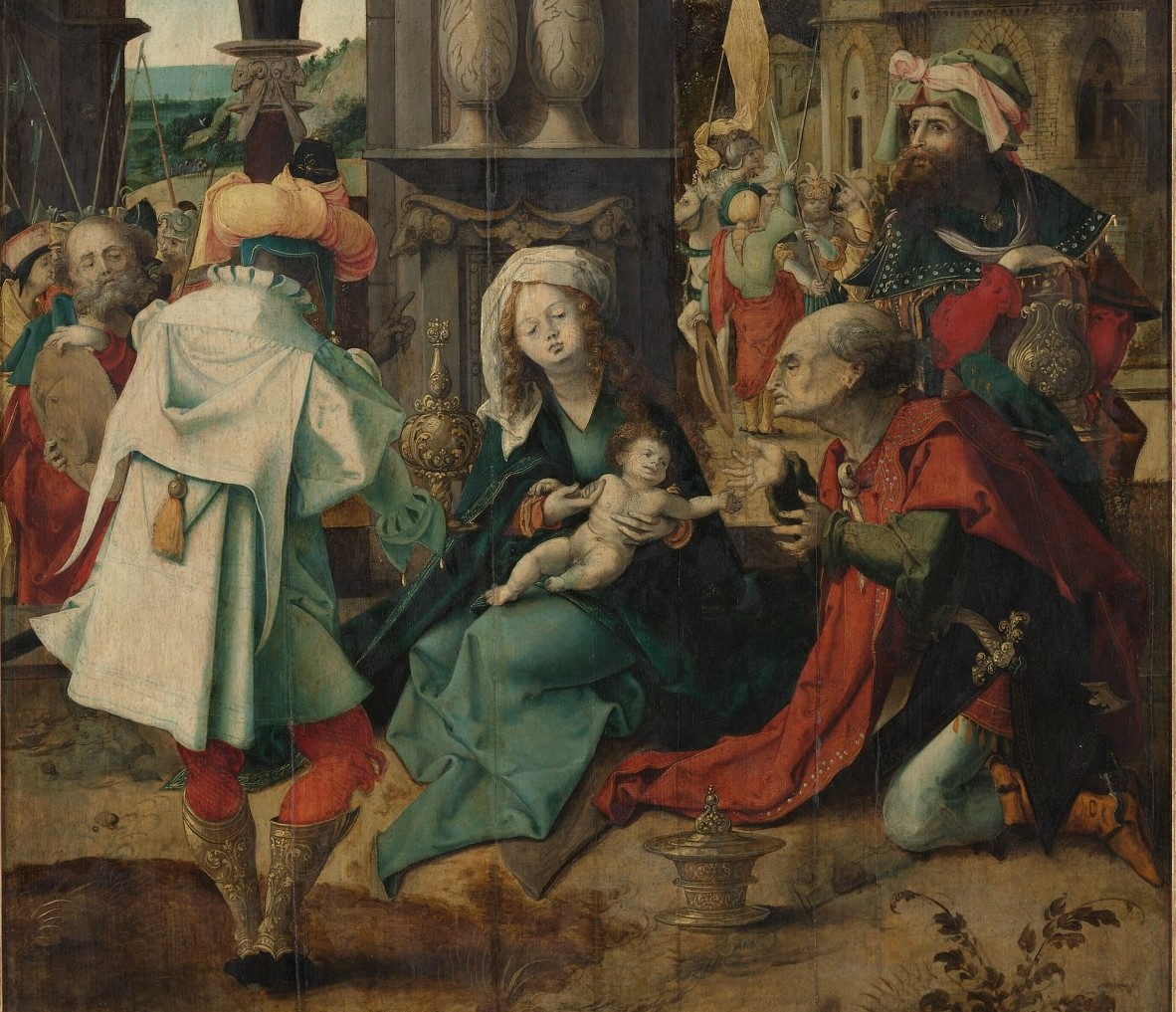
The main group in the Rotterdam Adoration

He should not be confused with the contemporary Master of the Antwerp Adoration, another Antwerp Mannerist.

== Emergence ==
During the 20th century, a number of paintings were attributed to Vellert. Max Jakob Friedländer in his Die Antwerpener Manieristen von 1520 (1915), which introduced the term "Antwerp Mannerists", and later work with Ludwig von Baldass, gave Vellert a coherent group of four paintings: The Lille Adoration (an Adoration of the Shepherds in the Palais des Beaux-Arts de Lille), the Rotterdam triptych (both illustrated here), a Holy Kinship in the Stiftsgalerie in Kremsmünster (a larger related version of the Rijksmuseum one shown here), and an Ecce Homo triptych in Brussels. A triptych Rest on the Flight into Egypt in a private collection (in 1995 location unknown) was later added by another scholar. It was generally agreed that these five works were by the same hand, but not universally that they were by Vellert. Other proposals were as early works of Jan Gossaert, or by another figure.

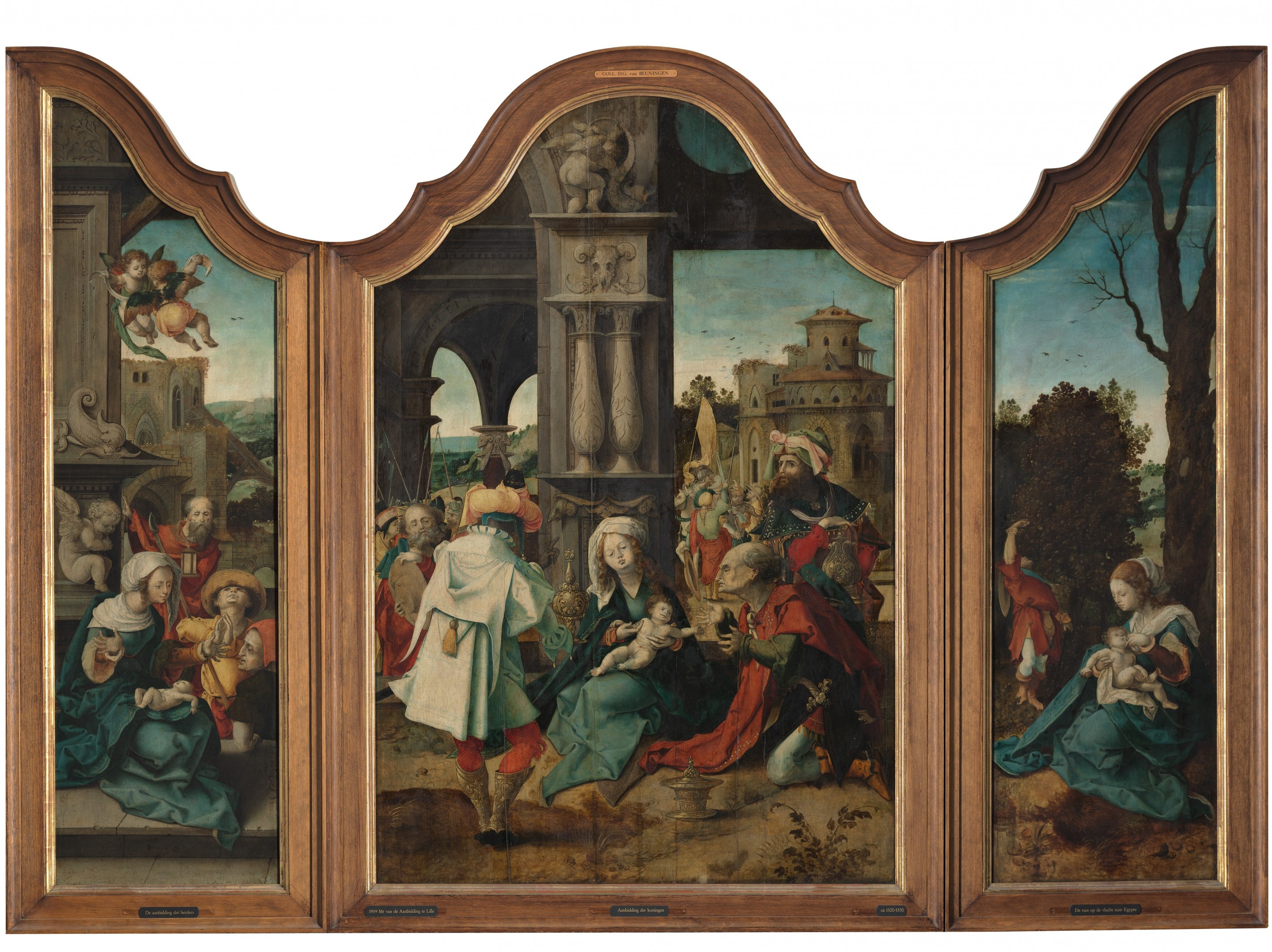
Triptych of the Adoration of the Magi, Museum Boijmans Van Beuningen, Rotterdam. Left side panel is an Adoration of the Shepherds and the right a Rest on the Flight into Egypt, unusually giving three scenes with the Holy Family. Max height 167 cm.

Konowicz compared these paintings to the stained glass and drawings for it by Vellert (who helpfully very often signed and dated his work) and concluded that they were not the same artist, therefore named the "new personality" the Master of the Lille Adoration. To the group of five, Konowicz added two half-length figures, one of Pontius Pilate in Sweden, and one version in Chicago of a Saint Jerome known in several versions by different hands. In 2014, a Jerome from a German private collection, given to the master, sold for US$149,000 at Christie's.

The Jeromes are now seen as the right-hand half of a diptych, or a pair of pendants, facing a composition of the Trinity which also exists in different examples (Warsaw example illustrated below). Through loans, the Fogg Museum in Harvard could display a pair (in 2006). Possibly buyers had the option of buying both works, or just one.

== Works ==
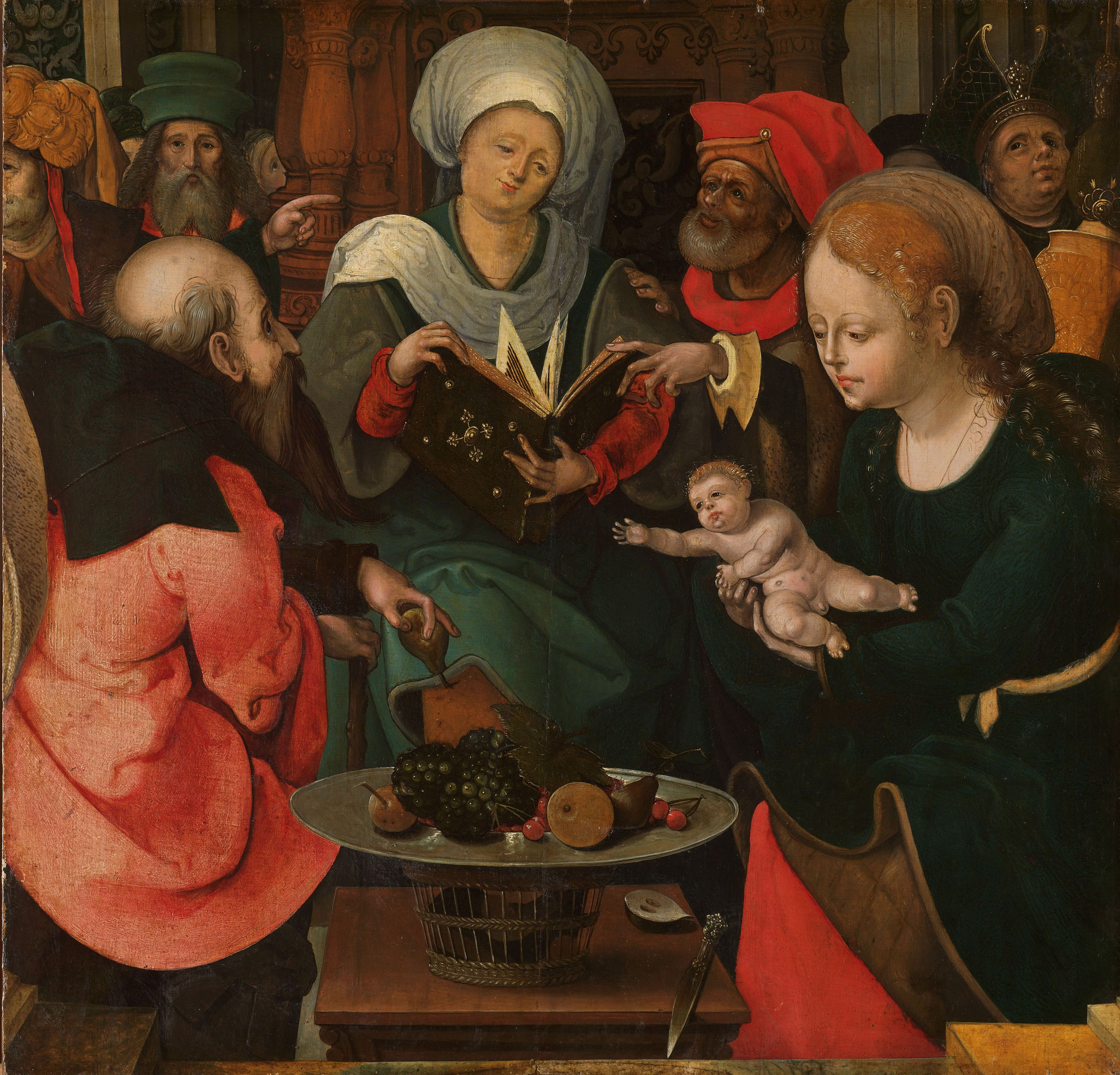
Holy Kinship, Rijksmuseum, 1520s.

"The two core paintings", in Rotterdam and Lille, and Konowicz's other attributions are mentioned above. The Amsterdam Holy Kinship is not mentioned by Konowicz, but is now attributed by the Rijksmuseum to the Master of the Lille Adoration, as a cut-down fragment with the central group from the painting in the Stiftsgalerie in Kremsmünster. This is a single panel, but divided by painted architecture into a triptych-like central section and two "wings", with all the figures in the lower half of the panel, below elaborate architecture. The Amsterdam painting shows the lower part of the central section, also slightly trimmed at the bottom.

A small number of other paintings have been reattributed from Vellert, or sometimes others, to the new figure. In 2007, a triptych of the Adoration of the Magi newly attributed to the master was sold for £228,500 at Sotheby's in London. In a rather unusual layout for this very common subject, the left wing is occupied by the black Magus, Saint Balthazar, and the right one by Saint Joseph. In the central panel, Saint Caspar kneels to offer his gift to the Virgin and Child, while Saint Melchior waits behind, beside two halberd-carrying attendants.

By 2010, Maryan Wynn Ainsworth thought three paintings previously given to Jan Gossaert fitted better with the master. These were a small Holy Family with the Coats of Arms of Charles V and Isabella of Portugal in St. Louis, a Lucretia in a Swiss private collection, and a male portrait in Hamilton, Ontario (McMaster University collection).

According to Konowicz in 1995, the triptych in Havana (Museo Nacional de Bellas Artes de La Habana), then recently attributed to Vellert, is neither by him nor the Master of the Lille Adoration, but by an artist influenced by the latter.

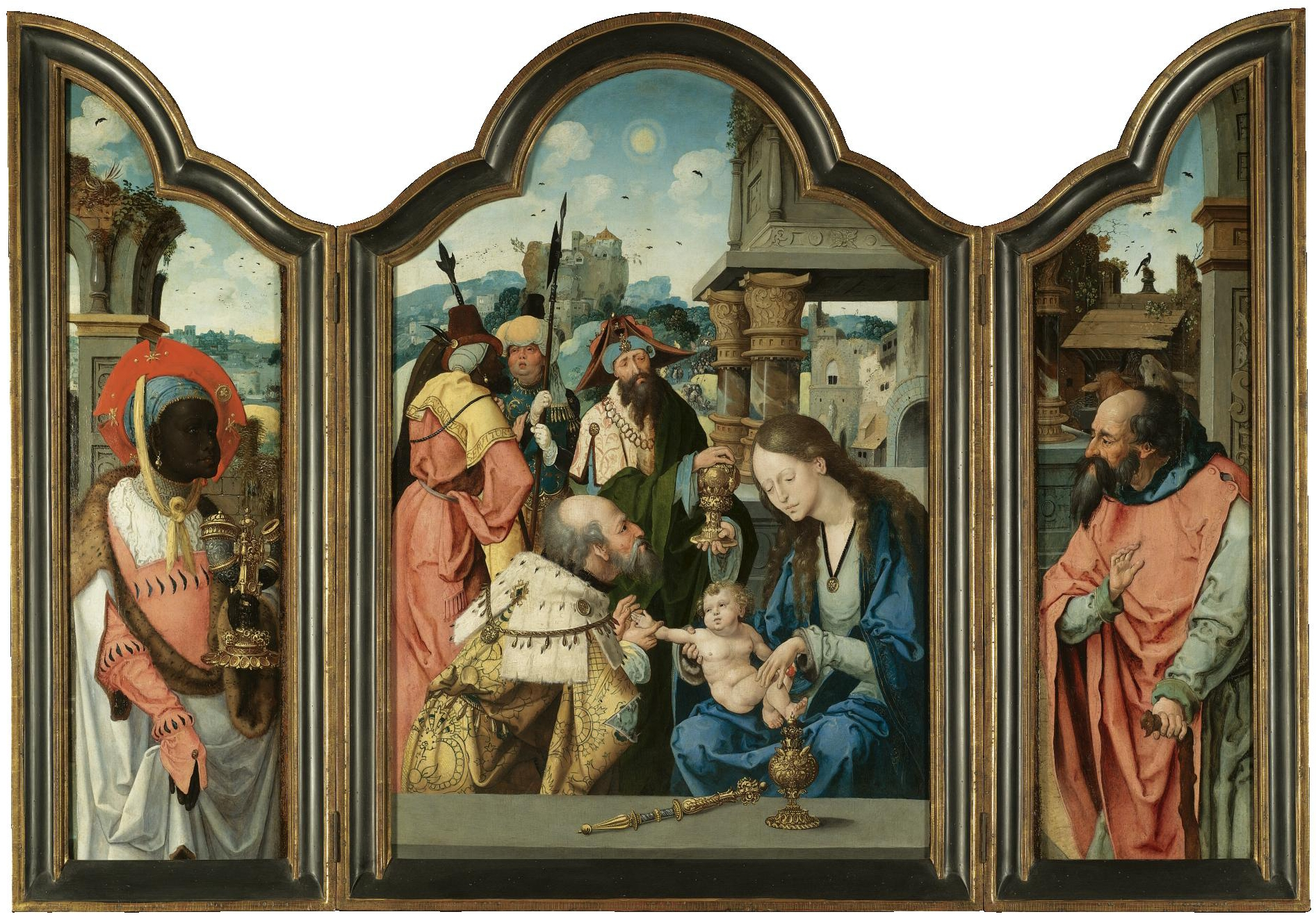
Triptych of the Adoration of the Magi, sold in 2007. Max height 59.5 cm (23.4 in)

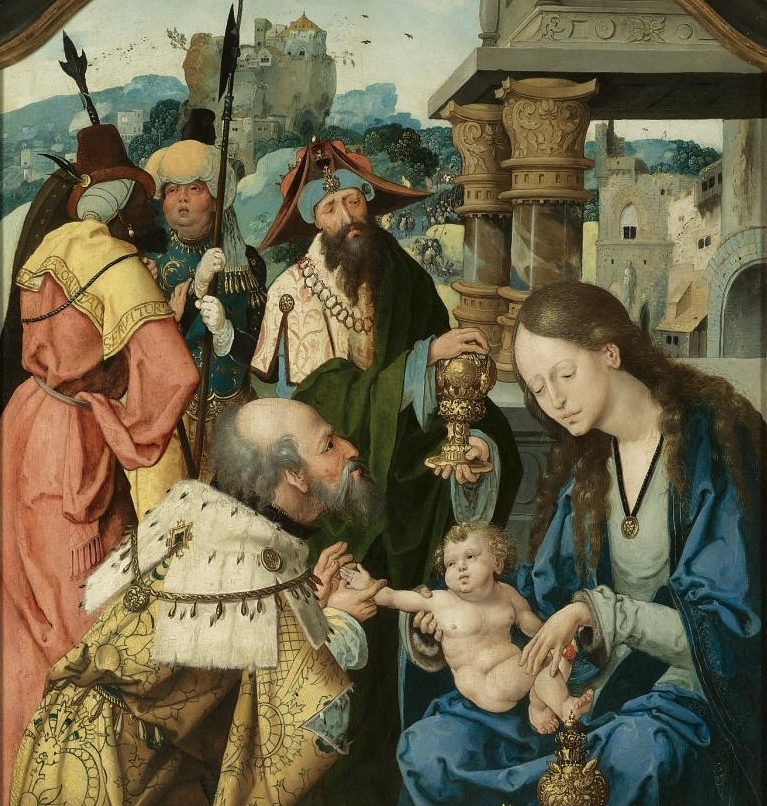
Central group

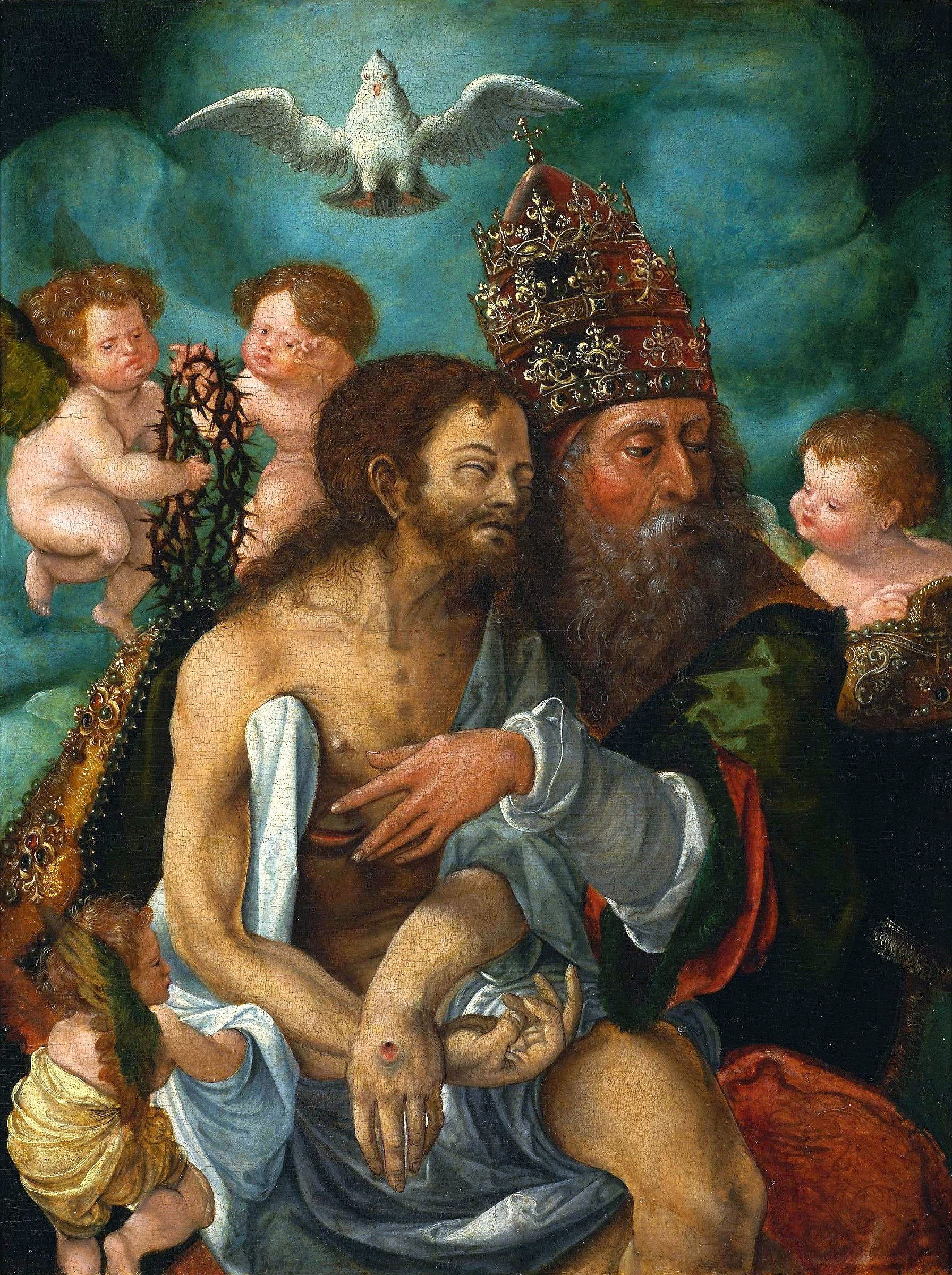
Holy Trinity, Warsaw, formerly attributed to Georg Pencz

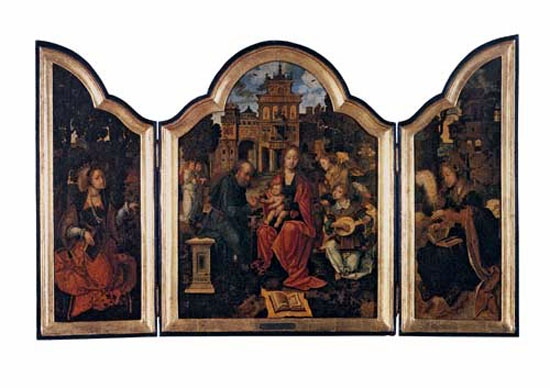
Holy Family, Havana
