= Adriaen van Overbeke =

Flemish painter (?–1529)

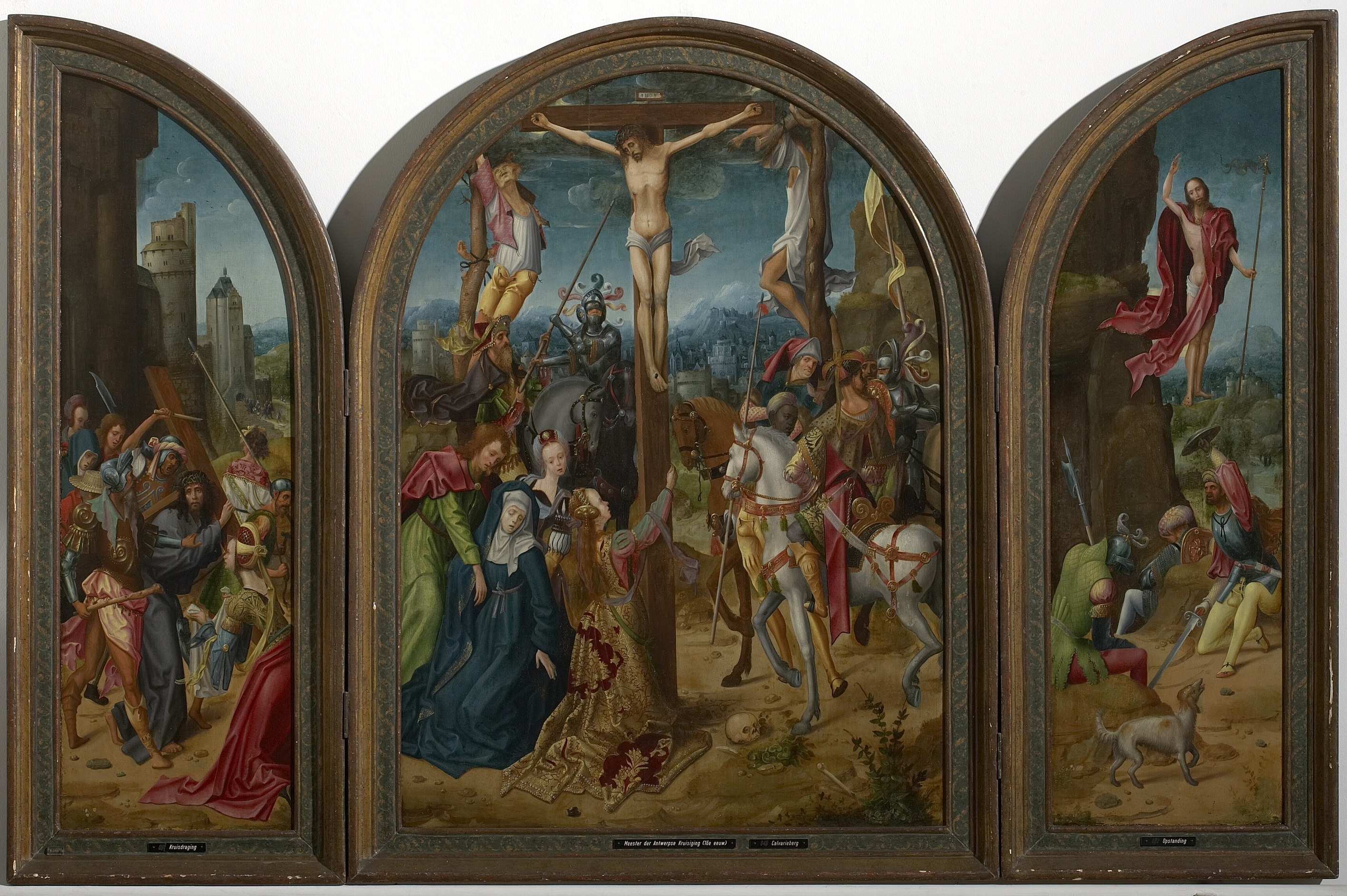
Triptych of the crucifixion, Maagdenhuis, Antwerp

Adriaen van Overbeke, Adrian van Overbeck and Adriaen van Overbeke (fl 1508 – 1529) was a Flemish Renaissance painter in the style of Antwerp Mannerism. He operated a large workshop with an important output of altarpieces, which were mainly exported to Northern France, the Rhineland and Westphalia. His known works were predominantly polychromed wooden altarpieces with painted shutters, which were created through a collaboration between painters and sculptors.

The artist has only recently been identified with the anonymous master who was given the notname 'Master of the Crucifixion of Antwerp' by Max Jakob Friedländer.

== Life ==
Very little is known with certainty about Adriaen van Overbeke's origins. Some art historians have speculated that he may be the Ariaen who is mentioned as a pupil of Quentin Matsys in the records of the Antwerp Guild of Saint Luke in 1495. He was registered as a master in the records of the Guild from 1508. He lived in a residence called "Schylt van Engelant" ('Shield of England') in the Keizerstraat in Antwerp.

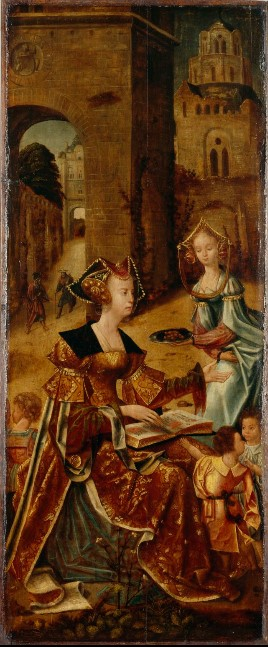
Maria Cleophas with children, from St. Anne Altar, St. Martin's Church, Euskirchen

He was paid for supplying a carved wood altarpiece (destroyed) for the Hospice of Our Lady in Lille in 1509. He did not undertake the commission himself but as a dealer as he sourced the sculpted elements and the painted wings out to other artists. In 1513 he is documented working on a commission for a retable for the Propsteikirche St. Mariä Geburt ('Provost Church of the Birth of Saint Mary') in Kempen (North Rhine-Westphalia). The retable was ordered by the local Annenbruderschaft ('Brotherhood of St Anne') and depicts scenes from the life of Saint Anne. The work is still on the high altar of the Propsteikirche. The painted wings of the altarpiece are among the earliest firmly dated paintings in the style of the Antwerp Mannerists and may be attributed to Adriaen van Overbeke himself or his assistants. The carved sections were probably the work of wood-carvers employed in his workshop.

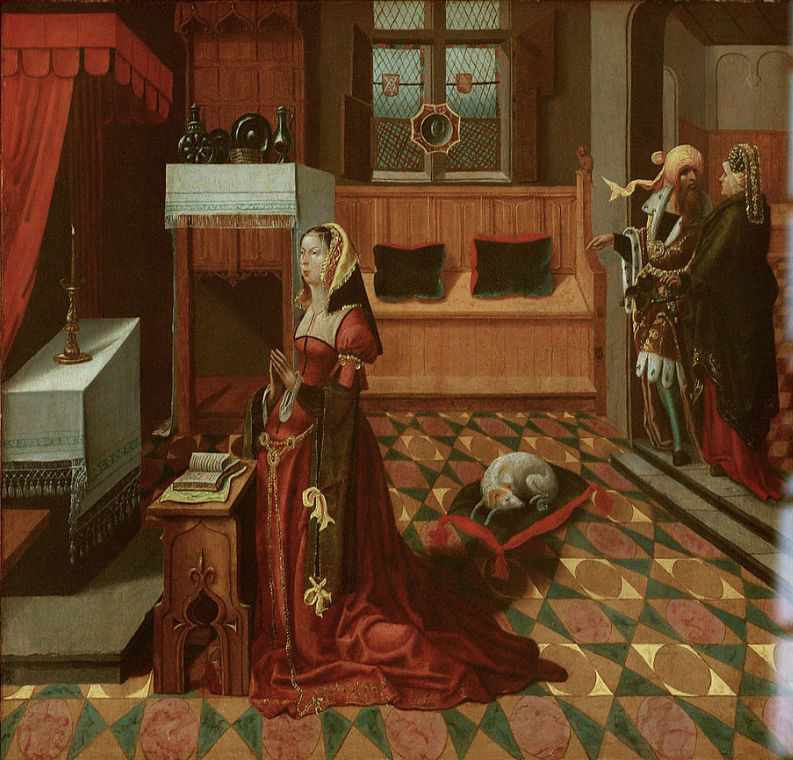
Emerentia at her prayer, Petrikirche, Dortmund

In 1517 he undertook with the painter Peter de Vleeminck and the carpenter Jan van der Hese to complete for the Franciscans in Valenciennes an altar which the painter Jan van Delft had left unfinished at his death. This work is considered lost. Van Overbeke acted as a witness to an agreement made in 1521 between the Franciscan monks of Dortmund and master carver Gieliszoon. The agreement concerned the transportation of a carved wooden altarpiece now in the Petrikirche, Dortmund. It is believed that van Overbeke had created the altarpiece together with the sculptor Jan Wraghe pursuant to another contract with the Franciscans of Dortmund. This altarpiece is believed to be the large retable that was moved to the Saint Peter's Church (Petrikirche) in Dortmund in 1809. It is referred to colloquially as das Goldene Wunder ('The golden miracle') due to the golden color of the polychromed sculptures. In 1522 van Overbeke had two pupils, Goyvaert van Roye and a Jeronimus (last name not recorded).

In 1529 he was commissioned to paint an Altar of St Joseph for a patron in Kempen (now lost). In the same year, the Brotherhood of St Nicholas in Kempen paid him for repairs to their Nicholas altar, which therefore can be assumed to have been his own work. In the same year, he bought gold leaf for three retables from the goldsmith Willem van Schorisse in Bruges. It is not known whether these retables were even made. In 1529 he bought gold leaf for three unknown retables from the goldsmith Willem van Schorisse in Bruges. In 1529 he agreed with the dealer Gheerarde van Sulps residing in Aachen to be his exclusive supplier in Aachen for a period of six years.

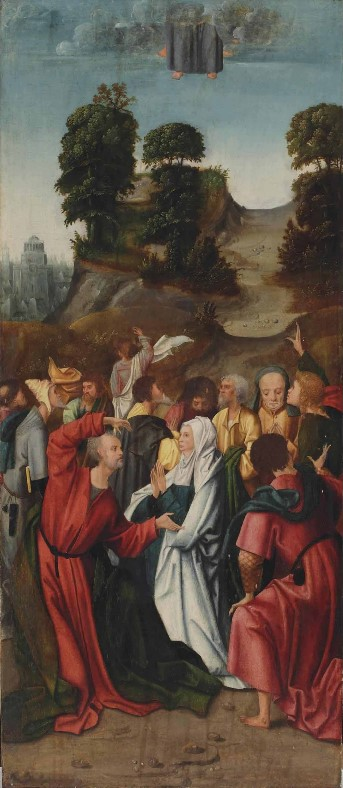
The Ascension of Christ

There is no mention of the artist in the records of the Antwerp Guild after 1529.

== Work ==
=== General ===
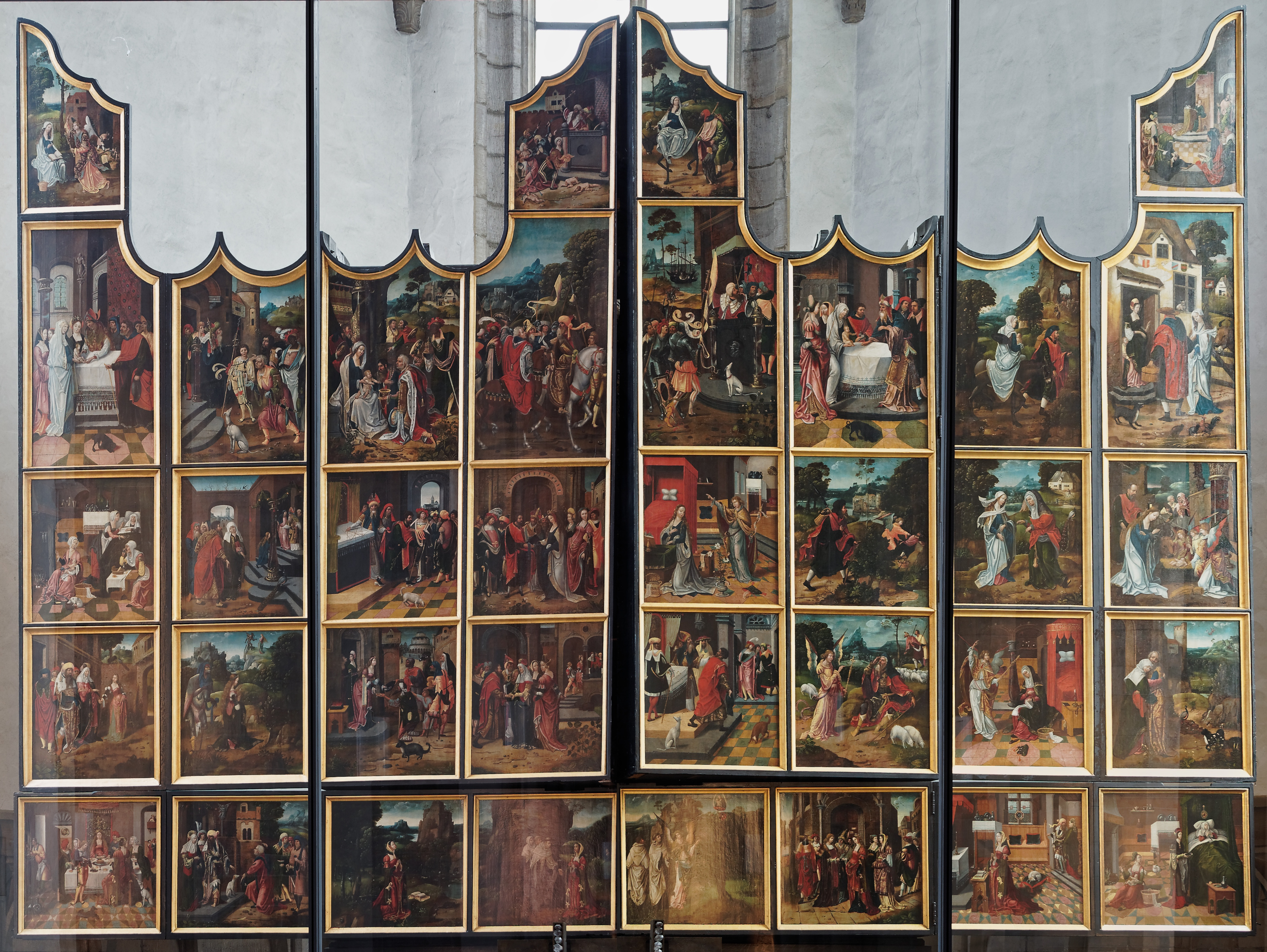
Retable of the Petrikirche, Dortmund

Adriaen van Overbeke is known for the production and supply of carved and polychromed wooden altarpieces with painted shutter wings. These were typically of large sizes. In Antwerp artistic practice this type of altarpiece was created collaboratively by painters and carvers often working within one workshop. This was possible because both belonged to the same guild. Van Overbeke may have run such a workshop. As the commissions required, he also outsourced to, or worked as of, the artists who created the sculpted portions of the retables.

The Triptych of the crucifixion the (Maagdenhuis, Antwerp) of 1510 is the earliest known work of Adriaen van Overbeke. It is entirely by van Overbeke's own hand and shows his artistic abilities as a painter. Figures from this altarpiece may have served as the models on which the workshop style of van Overbeke was based. From the 1620s his workshop gained commercial success and many assistants were hired. The quality of the output suffered as a result. The paintings of the St Anne Altar for the Propsteikirche St. Mariä Geburt in Kempen were mainly finished by assistants. Only the underdrawings were executed by Adriaen van Overbeke himself. The altarpieces dated 1510 and 1517 for Lille and Valenciennes were workshop products in which van Overbeke did not even paint the underdrawings. Unlike other Antwerp workshops, the van Overbeke workshop never mass-produced similar designs but rather created works that were tailor-made in response to the specific requirements of patrons.

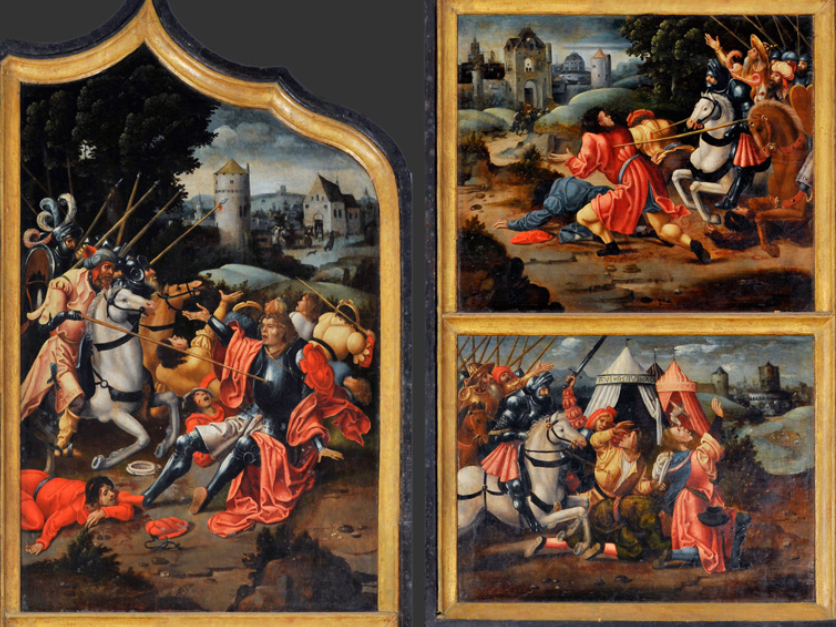
The martyrdom of St Victor

Other works attributed to van Overbeke include:

- the painted panels made for the St. Anne Altar (c. 1510–1515) at the St. Martin's Church in Euskirchen, which are no longer attached to the sculptures but are dispersed including one panel depicting Maria Cleophas with children in the Germanisches Nationalmuseum in Nürnberg and another in the collection Hans Jürg Brumann in Switzerland;
- the Outer panels of the retabel of St Mary in Västerås Cathedral; and
- the painted panels of the Klepping Altar (c. 1520–1525) in the Petrikirche (St Peter's Church) in Soest, Germany.

=== Style ===
Van Overbeke was the head of a large workshop, which employed many assistants. He further developed collaborations with other Antwerp workshops including of painters and sculptors. He appeared therefore in contemporary contracts both as a principal as well as a subcontractor. With the increasing success of his business, he gradually participated less in the execution of works and he became an entrepreneur who relied on workshop assistants and other workshops to create the altarpieces.

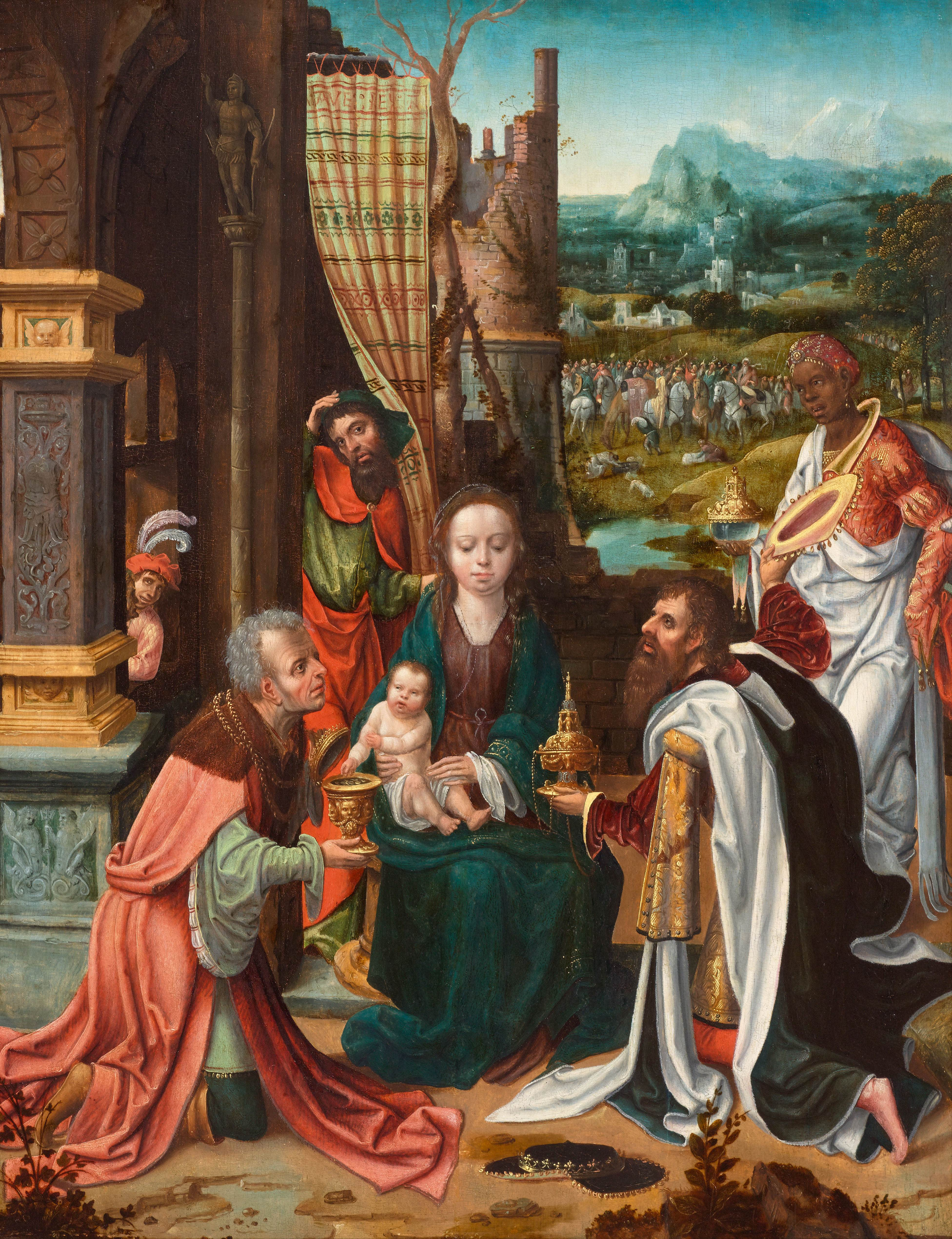
The Adoration of the Magi

Models in his workshop were used to create a workshop style. The workshop style also included compliance with certain conventions regarding the palette which remained very similar over a period of about 15 years. Blue and red dominate in strong tones. Continuity of the workshop style was also achieved through a rational image design. The figures were brought to the foreground and often recurring groups of figures must have been based on workshop templates. The design of various compositions relied on prints of Albrecht Dürer. The adoption of a workshop style explains why it is difficult to attribute works to him on style-critical grounds. Van Overbeke himself is believed to have spent a lot of his time traveling abroad to meet with his patrons. Unlike other workshops in Antwerp, the van Overbeke workshop is not known for serially produced altarpieces of the passion of Christ or the life of the Virgin Mary. Typical traits of van Overbeke's style are the tall figures with somewhat elongated faces and small eyes, broad faces with the hanging angle of the mouth and sunken eyes, and thin hands with long fingers. The landscapes typically contain rock formations.

Van Overbeke is considered a representative of Antwerp Mannerism. The term Antwerp Mannerism was coined by Friedländer in the early 20th century to refer to a transitory phase in Netherlandish art from the late Gothic to works inspired by the Italian Renaissance. The terms "Manier" and "Manierist" were used by Friedländer to refer to the original even unusual motifs in the body of work categorized under this style. The terms carried a pejorative connotation as these works were regarded as inferior to work produced by Pieter Coecke van Aelst, Quentin Matsys and other contemporaries. The style of these works was often extravagant. This was reflected in how the folds of the flamboyant and exotic clothes worn by the figures defied gravity. These figures were usually depicted in agitated poses amidst architectural ruins. The earlier works included Gothic architecture but in later works Renaissance structures became prevalent. The paintings appear to combine Early Netherlandish and Northern Renaissance styles, and incorporate both Flemish and Italian traditions into the same compositions. Most of the artists of Antwerp Mannerism have remained anonymous and only some of the artists have been identified. They include Jan de Beer and the Master of 1518 (possibly Jan Mertens or Jan van Dornicke). Adriaen van Overbeke himself was only recently identified with the anonymous master who was given the notname 'Master of the Crucifixion of Antwerp' by Friedländer.
