= Jan de Molder =

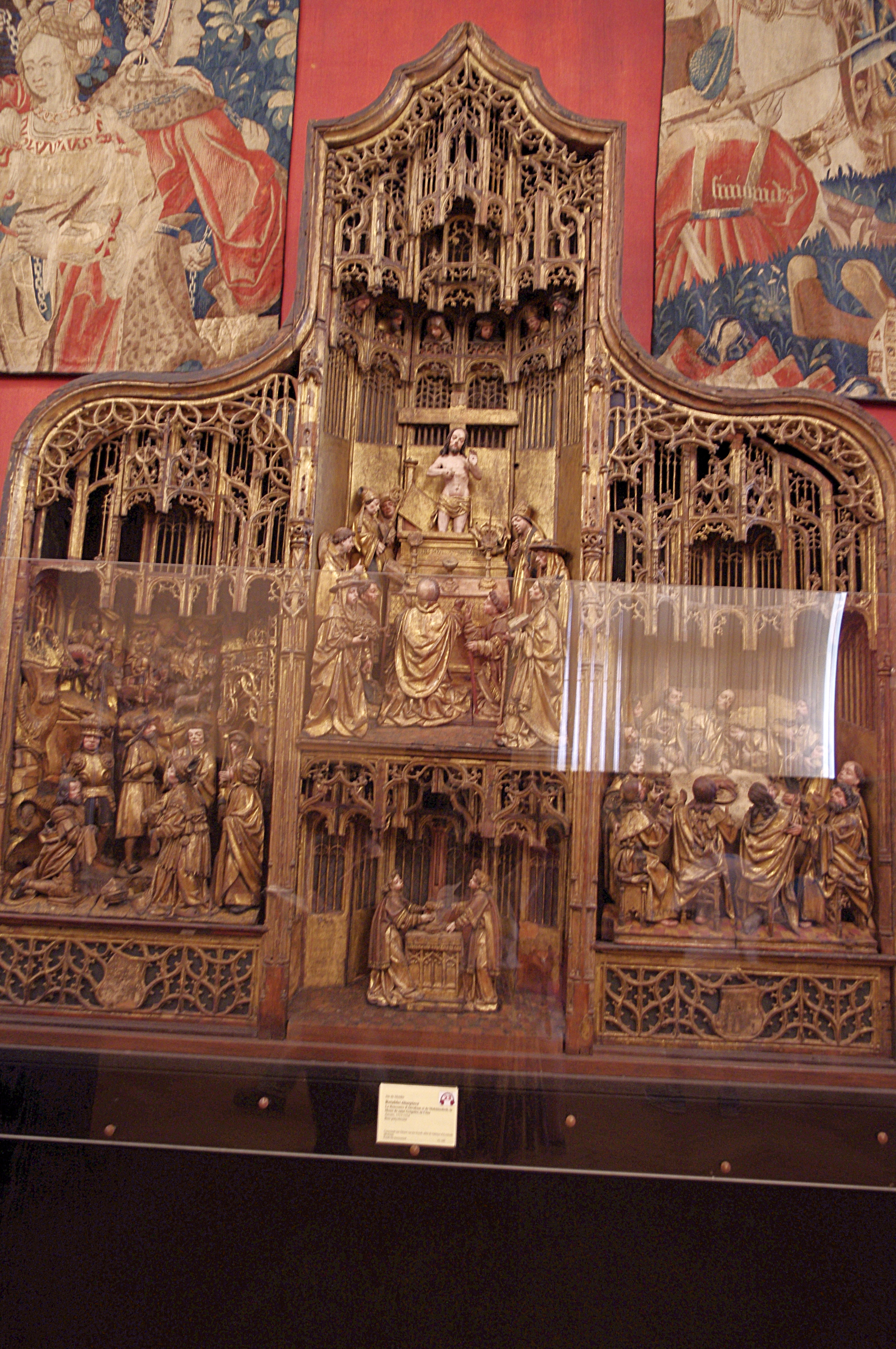
Altarpiece by Jan de Molder today in the Cluny Museum, Paris

Jan de Molder (sometimes Jean de Molder, fl. 1494–1550) was a Northern Renaissance wood carver active in Antwerp in the early 16th century. His work represents the beginnings of Antwerp Mannerism.

== Life ==
Very little is known about the life of Jan de Molder. He was active in Antwerp and was brother-in-law of a prior of Averbode Abbey named Adriaen. Works of his hand survive in the Cluny Museum in Paris and in the churches of Botkyrka, Dillnäs, Lofta, Västerlövsta and Västerfärnebo churches, Sweden.

== Work ==
The artist is known only for the production of two carved altarpieces for the abbey of Averbode. The first one commissioned in 1513 is an altarpiece bearing the Antwerp mark of quality and the arms of the abbey of Averbode now in the Cluny Museum in Paris. The carved scenes are identical with those specified in the Averbode contract. The second altarpiece is lost.

The style of the Cluny altarpiece shows the beginnings of Antwerp Mannerism in its elaborate and arched frame and the crowded compositions. The compact and animated figure types, unaffected gestures and angular drapery are regarded as more characteristic of late 15th-century sculpture.

Other characteristics are visible in a polyptych in the collection of the National Museum in Warsaw - so-called Saint Reinhold Altar. 10 scenes from the life of Mary arranged in 2 rows with additional 4 sections with figures of Saints were crowned by architectural decorations in the form of curved tracery. The top of the retable in variety of curves and accolades, as well as disproportionality of figures are other features of de Molder's style. Oak wood, used for production, was covered with a coating of gesso (size and chalk) over which gold leaf and colour were laid. The polyptych was commissioned by Brotherhood of Saint Reinhold in Gdańsk and created before 1516 in cooperation with Joos van Cleve who painted the side wings.
