= Madonna and Child with Saint Catherine of Alexandria and Saint Barbara =

Painting by the Master of Hoogstraeten

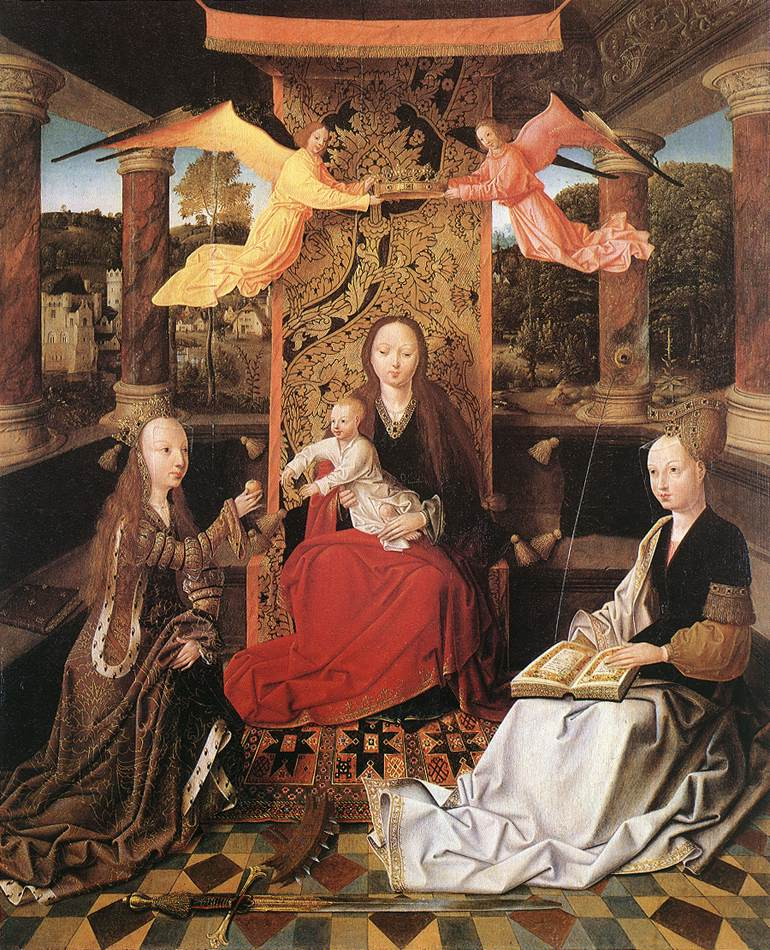
Madonna and Child with Saint Catherine of Alexandria and Saint Barbara (c. 1520) by Master of Hoogstraeten

Madonna and Child with Saint Catherine of Alexandria and Saint Barbara is a c. 1520 oil on panel painting by the Master of Hoogstraeten, an anonymous Antwerp master active between around 1490 and 1530. It is now in the Uffizi Gallery, in Florence.

Long attributed to Hugo van der Goes (an attribution strongly opposed by Giovanni Battista Cavalcaselle), it was later reattributed to Civetta and finally received its present attribution in 1929 thanks to research by Max Friedländer, who compared it to a work in the Benda collection in Vienna.

Faggin theorised a link between the painting and The Seven Sorrows of the Virgin, a series of works from St Catherine's Church in Hoogstraten now in the Royal Museum of Fine Arts Antwerp.

== Analysis ==
It draws on the works of Hans Memling, with a similar composition of a Madonna and Child under a richly decorated canopy and with a figure either side, in this case Catherine of Alexandria (who offers the Christ Child an apple symbolising original sin) and Saint Barbara. The Christ Child takes the apple, symbolising his sacrifice for the redemption of the world. Unlike Memling's work, however, the idyllic north-European background landscape is seen almost in its entire length and depth rather than through limited windows. The flying angels bearing Mary's crown and Mary's pose and expression all also show influence from Hugo van der Goes.
