= Antwerp Mannerism =

Northern Renaissance art movement

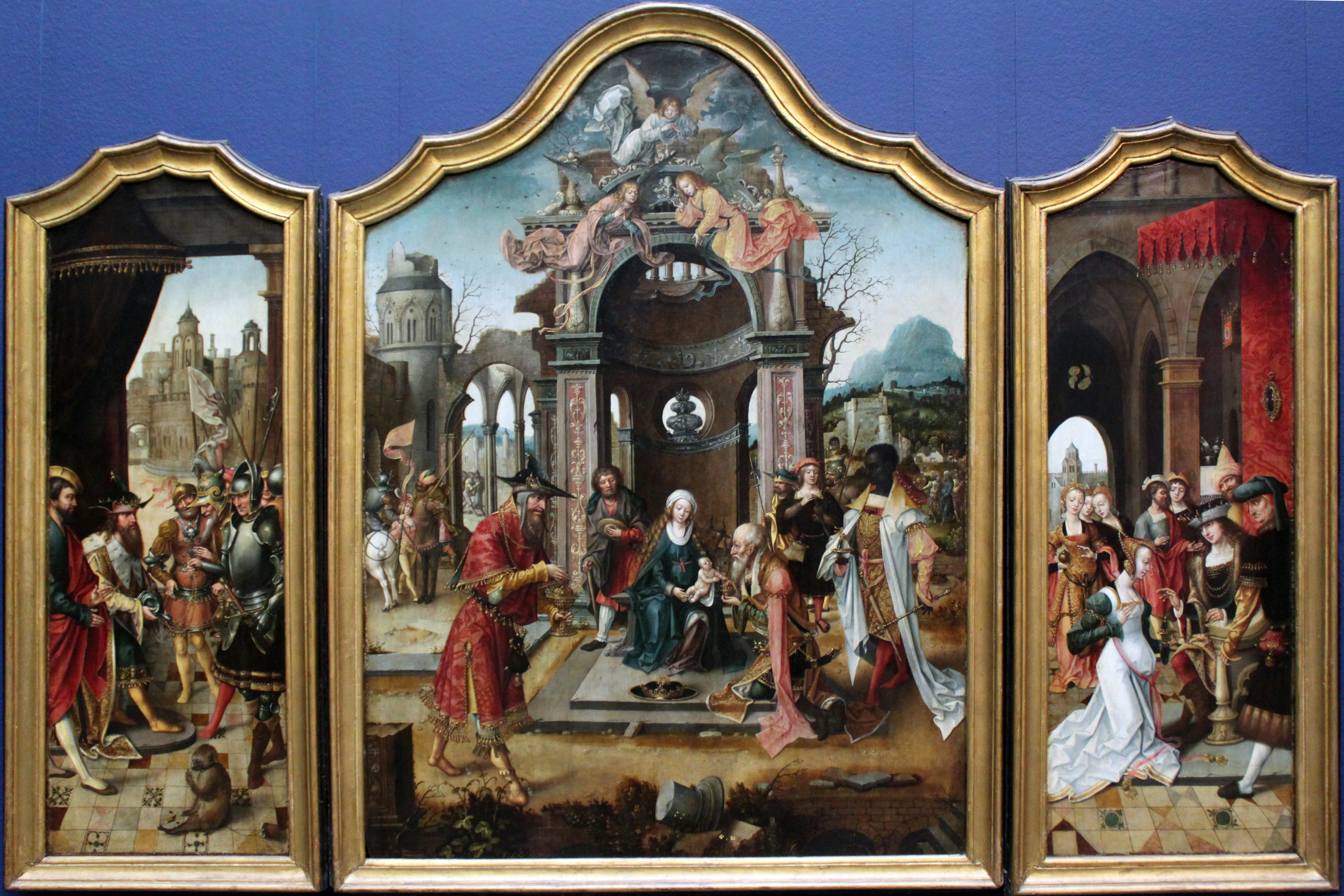
Master of the Von Groote Adoration, the Von Groote Adoration of the Magi, with at left King David receiving the Emissaries of the Twelve Tribes and right The Queen of Sheba before Solomon

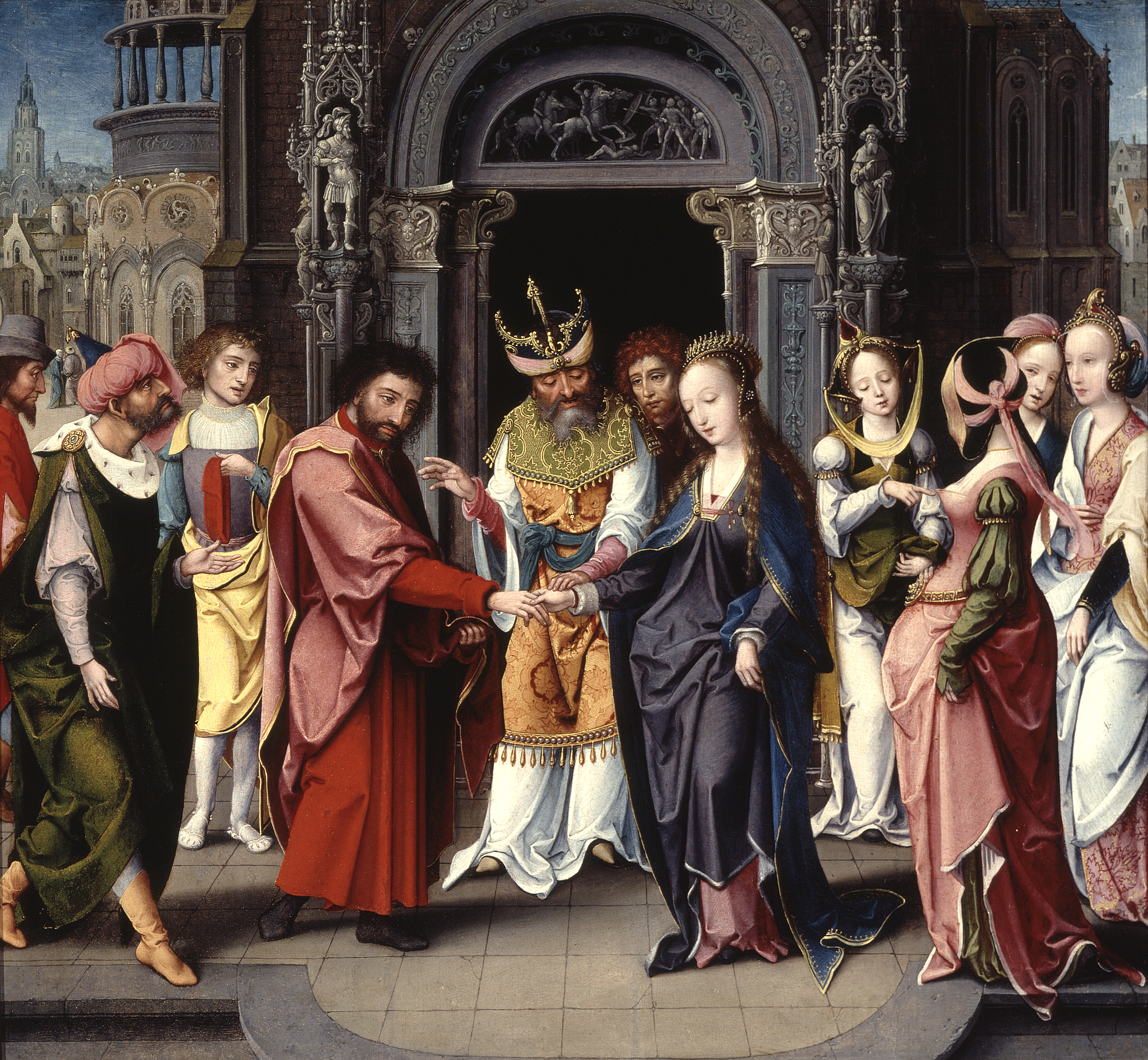
Jan van Dornicke, The Marriage of the Virgin, Saint Louis Art Museum

Antwerp Mannerism refers to the style of a group of largely anonymous painters active in the southern Netherlands, principally in Antwerp, in roughly the first three decades of the 16th century. The movement marks the tail end of Early Netherlandish painting and an early phase within Dutch and Flemish Renaissance painting. The style bore no relation to Italian Mannerism, which it mostly predates by a few years, but the name suggests that it was a reaction to the "classic" style of the earlier Flemish painters, just as the Italian Mannerists were reacting to, or trying to go beyond, the classicism of High Renaissance art.

The Antwerp Mannerists' style is certainly "mannered", and "characterized by an artificial elegance. Their paintings typically feature elongated figures posed in affected, twisting, postures, colorful ornate costumes, fluttering drapery, Italianate architecture decorated with grotesque ornament, and crowded groups of figures...". Joseph Koerner notes "a diffuse sense of outlandishness in Antwerp art, of an exoticism both of subject and means ... evoking a non-localized elsewhere".

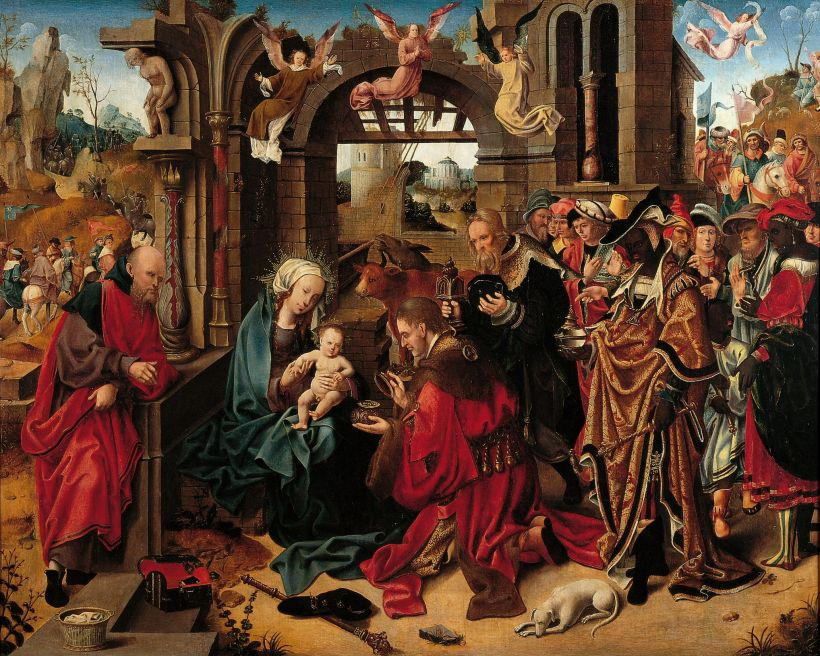
Adoration of the Magi by anonymous Antwerp Mannerist

The subject of the Adoration of the Magi was a particular favourite, as it allowed the artists to give free rein to their preoccupation with ornament and the simulation and imitation of luxury products. The Biblical Magi were also regarded as the patron saints of travellers and merchants, which was relevant for the painters' clientele in what had become Europe's main centre for international trade, in a "meteoric rise" after 1501, when the first Asian cargos were landed by Portuguese ships. The theme of rich commodities arriving from distant and exotic parts of the world had a natural appeal to Antwerp merchant buyers, a large proportion themselves foreign. Many artists from around the Netherlands and further afield moved to the city to benefit from the boom, which saw large workshops "that grew into assembly lines", and a great increase in the quantity of art produced, but also some fall in quality; this is especially seen among the minor figures grouped under this term. Many smaller works were produced without commissions, for sale from shop windows, at fairs, or to dealers, rather than for an individual commission, an indication of a growing trend in Netherlandish painting. The Antwerp Pand was a trade fair lasting six weeks, where many painters sold works, and the latest ideas were exchanged and diffused.

Although sometimes spoken of as the "subterm "Antwerp Mannerism" as part of "Northern Mannerism in the early sixteenth century", the movement is better distinguished from the Northern Mannerism of later in the century, which developed from Italian Mannerism. There was very little continuity between the two, with Northern Mannerism proper developing in the Netherlands only after a gap of about fifty years after Antwerp Mannerism declined in the 1530s, and after the next stylistic wave of Romanism, heavily influenced by Italian painting, as seen in the later works of Gossaert.

== Name ==
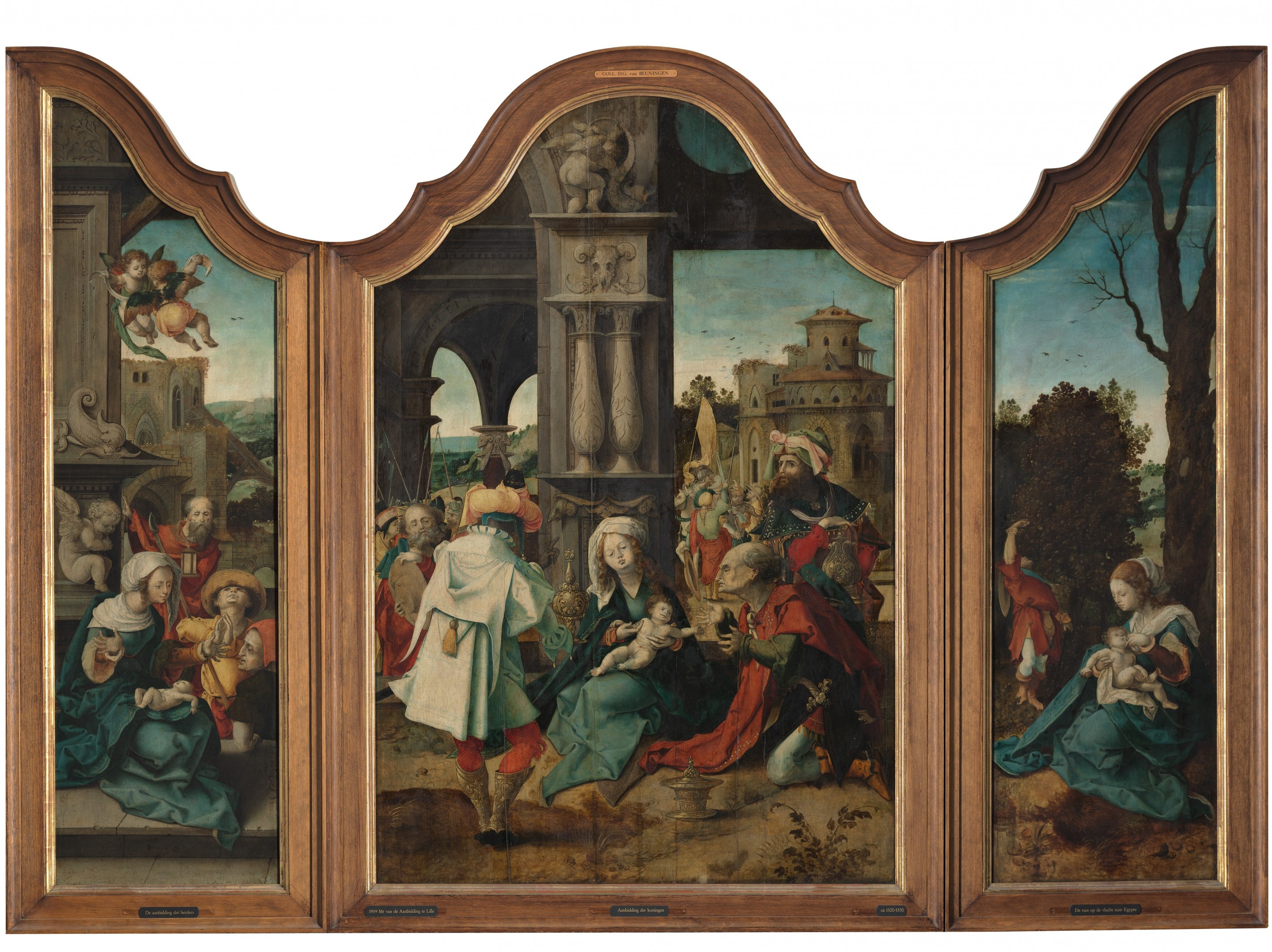
Master of the Lille Adoration triptych of the Adoration of the Magi, Museum Boijmans Van Beuningen, Rotterdam

The term Antwerp Manierists was first used in 1915 by Max Jakob Friedländer in his work Die Antwerpener Manieristen von 1520, in which he made a first attempt to put order in the growing number of works from the Netherlands that were catalogued under the "name of embarrassment 'pseudo-Herri met de Bles' " (usually now "Pseudo Bles" or "Pseudo-Blesius"). Friedländer used the term Antwerp Mannerism here as synonymous for "Antwerp style". Even though he added the location 'Antwerp' to name the artists and placed them in the year 1520, Friedländer made it clear that he did not intend to limit the group strictly to Antwerp and the time period to circa 1520, even though he was of the opinion that most of the "pseudo-Bles' works originated from Antwerp and Antwerp workshops. Friedländer placed the works attributed to the group in a time period between 1500 and 1530.

Despite the name Antwerp Mannerism the style was not limited to Antwerp. The style also appeared in the north of France and the Northern Netherlands.

== Artists ==
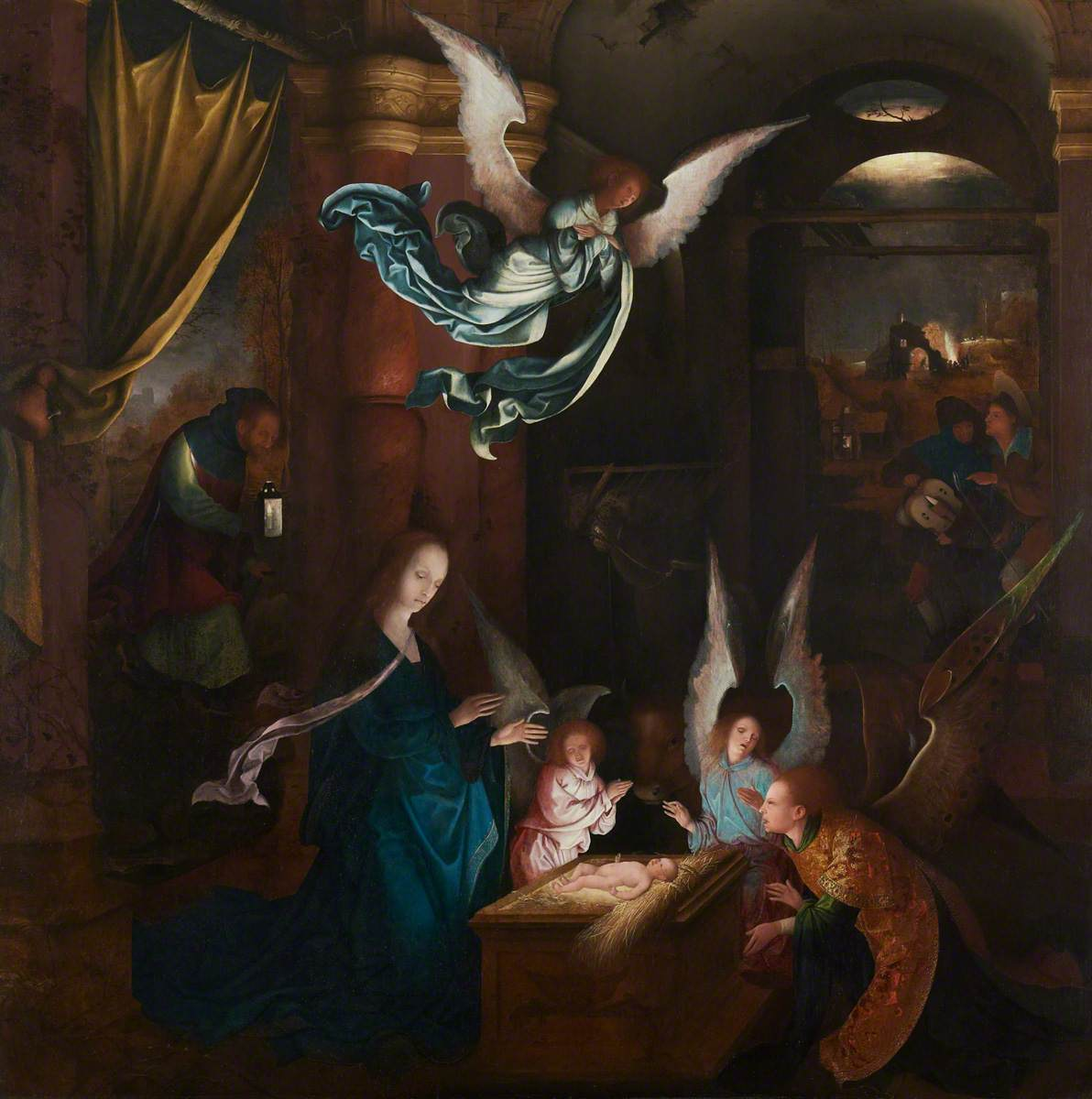
The Nativity by Jan de Beer, 1515–1525.

Although attempts have been made to identify the individual artists that were part of this movement, most of the paintings remain attributed to anonymous masters as the paintings were not signed. This anonymity has contributed to a lack of knowledge about or popularity of their works. Only a minority of the works have been attributed. The makers of the altarpieces have been given notnames based on any external knowledge about the works such as an inscription, a previous owner, the place where it was kept or a date found on the work. These include as the Pseudo-Bles, the Master of the Von Groote Adoration, the Master of Amiens, the Master of the Antwerp Adoration and the Master of 1518. Works that cannot be attributed directly to a named master are attributed to Anonymous Antwerp Mannerist. The Master of the Lille Adoration is a new figure, first proposed in 1995.

There is evidence that some workshops developed division of labour, with different artists specializing in figures, landscape or architectural backgrounds, and dividing the work on a particular painting between them, and different workshops specializing in one or two subjects. Compositions were often copied, repeated or adapted; for example at least six versions of an Adoration of the Magi triptych composition by Joos van Cleve and his workshop are known, though varying considerably in size, with the widths of the centre panel ranging from 56 to 93 cm.

It has been possible to identify some of the artists. Jan de Beer, Jan de Molder, the Master of 1518 (possibly Jan Mertens or Jan van Dornicke) and Adriaen van Overbeke are some of the identified artists who are regarded as Antwerp Mannerists. The early paintings of Jan Gossaert and Adriaen Isenbrandt (in Bruges) also show characteristics of the style. The paintings combine Early Netherlandish and Northern Renaissance styles, and incorporate both Flemish and Italian traditions into the same compositions.

A particular problem is that Antwerp was very badly hit by the Beeldenstorm of 1566, when a large proportion of the altarpieces in the churches were destroyed by iconoclastic rioters. Some of these are documented and probably many were signed, which would have helped greatly in attributing the mostly smaller paintings that have survived; these were no doubt still in private houses. The Sack of Antwerp or "Spanish Fury" of 1576, by unpaid Spanish troops caused much further destruction.

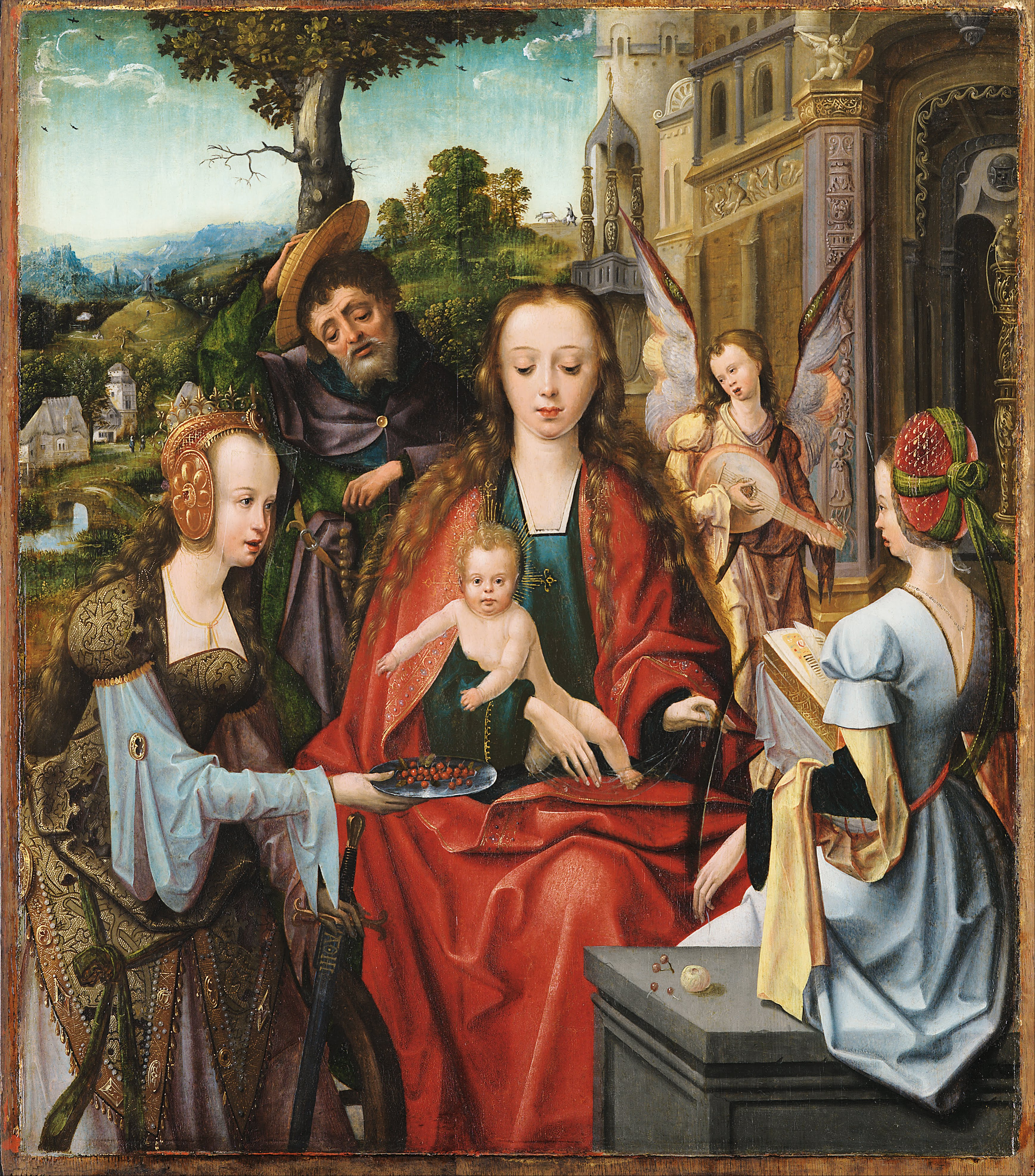
Master of the Antwerp Adoration (and workshop), The Holy Family with Two Saints, c. 1520

Elsewhere in the Netherlands, artists in the large workshop of Cornelis Engebrechtsz. in Leiden seem to have pulled their reluctant master in the Mannerist direction, and at least the extravagant clothes and architectural settings are seen in the otherwise more solidly based works of the Master of Delft and in Haarlem Jan Mostaert. The Antwerp workshop of Joos van Cleve (probably originally German) could work in the style, as well as others.

== Subjects and style ==
The Antwerp Mannerists typically depicted religious subjects, which they interpreted generally in a more superficial manner than the Flemish artists of the previous century in favour of a more fluid form and an abundance of meticulously rendered details.

Although one scholar has described Friedlander's label as "utterly inefficient as a stylistic guide", there are communalities. Their "essentially late Gothic style is characterized by calligraphically complicated compositions peopled with elongated, theatrically-dressed figures animated by improbable poses and repetitive gestures". According to James Snyder, "Receptivity, not originality, characterises the style of Antwerp painting, resulting in a hodgepodge of modes that are nearly impossible to sort out... With some effort, a few basic tendencies can be discerned which include selective eclecticism and archaism in terms of style, Mannerism in matters of taste, and specialization in subject matter."

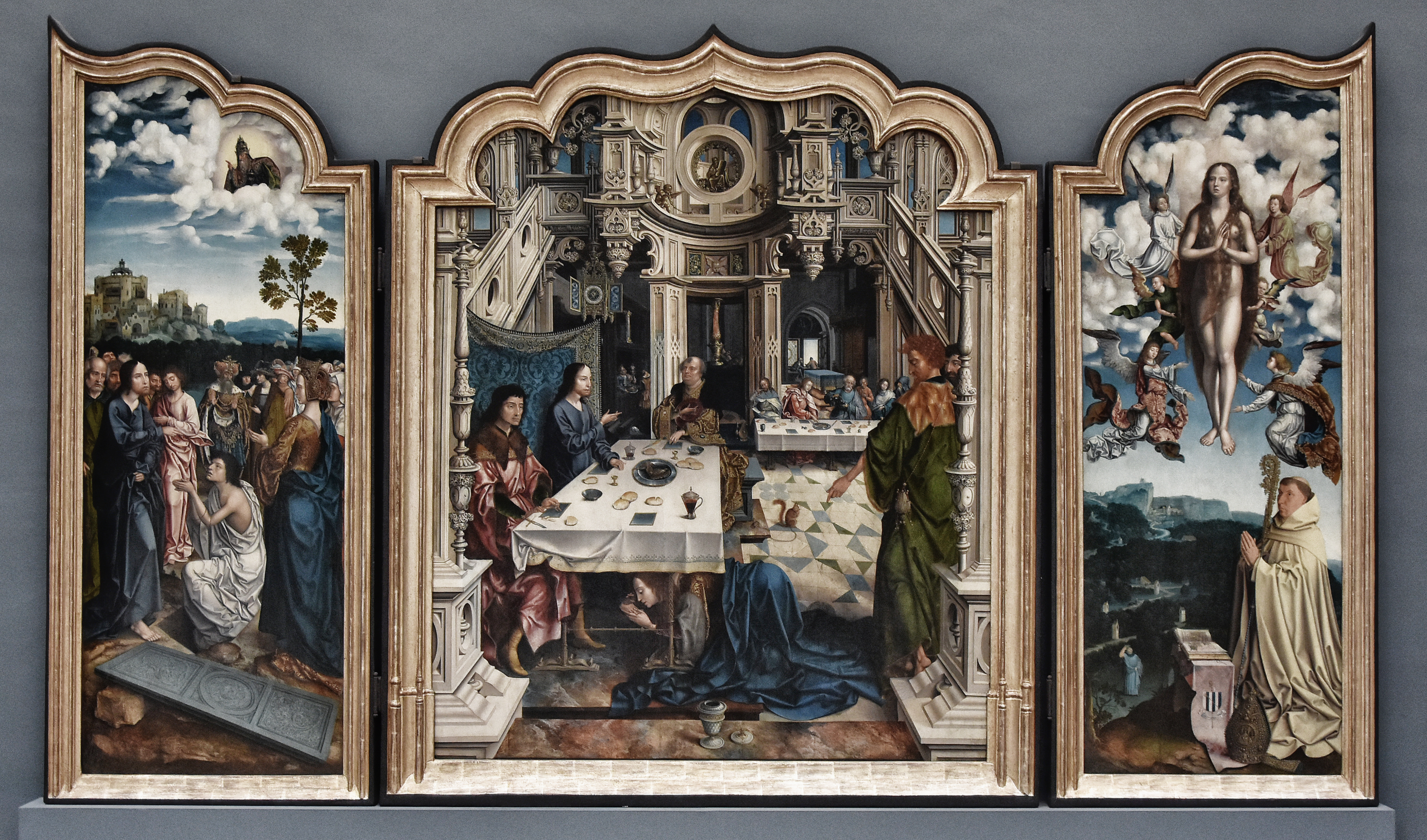
Master of 1518, triptych with Raising of Lazarus, Last Supper, and Mary Magdalene with donor portrait

The compositions typically include architectural ruins. The architecture is initially Gothic but later Renaissance motifs become dominant. The "antique" style appears in paintings when hardly any built examples existed in the Low Countries, any more than ruins from Roman architecture. The Mannerist painters show very little evidence of having visited Italy (where Jan Gossaert had been in 1508–09), and their idea of alla antica style must be derived from Italian prints, and sometimes drawings. At this period painters or other artists were the usual designers of buildings, especially their ornament, and until a court case in Utrecht in 1543, master-masons were prohibited from doing so there by guild restrictions.

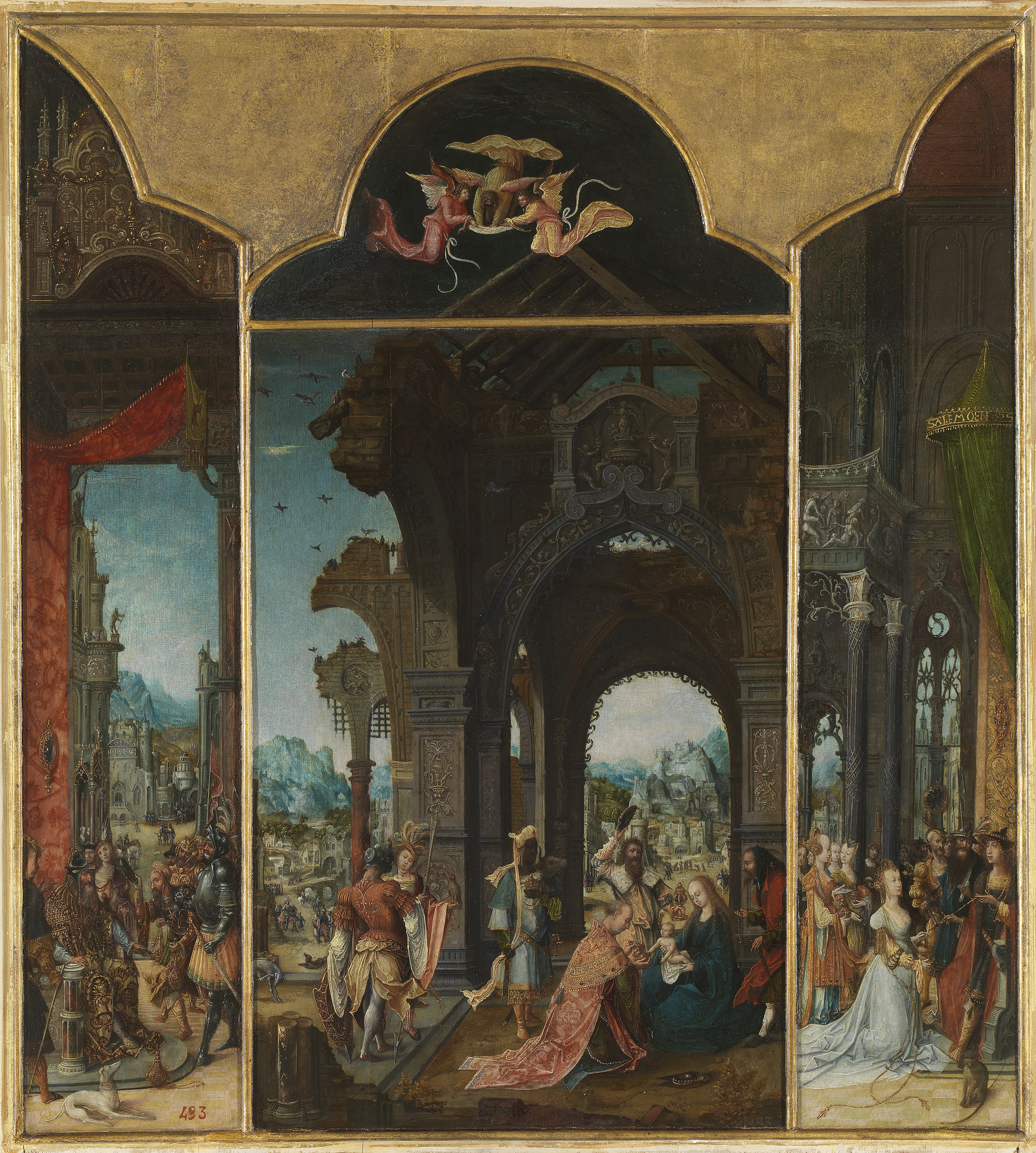
Adoration of the Magi, with left King David receiving the Emissaries of the Twelve Tribes and right The Queen of Sheba before Solomon, c. 1515, given to the "Pseudo-blesius", Prado.

The fantastic and exotic costumes many characters wear were already a feature of Early Netherlandish painting in the previous century, and the Biblical Magi and their retinues gave one of the most typical settings for this. They seem to derive partly from theatrical contexts, such as tableaux vivants in royal entries and other pageants, which artists were often asked to design.

Another influence was the visit of the Byzantine Emperor John VIII Palaiologos and his 700-strong retinue to the Ferrara stage of the Council of Florence in 1438. They were drawn by Pisanello and others, and the drawings were copied across Europe. The emperor's stylish hat, with a long pointed peak in front, seen on the Medal of John VIII Palaeologus, was especially popular, and versions appear in a good proportion of paintings of the Magi (as in some illustrated here). The large costumes were also useful in concealing deficiencies in the artists' figure drawing, which the complicated poses would otherwise have exposed. The artists liked "chromatic" colouring, as was becoming fashionable in Italy, and coleur changeante transitions between colours in fabrics, imitating silks (called cangiante in Italy).

Compositional elements, especially figures, are often taken from outside sources, especially prints, but also drawings which appear to have been passed around within and perhaps between workshops:"Thus background groups are endlessly repeated, the same repoussoire figures fill in a variety of empty corners, and stock poses answer many demands". The prints of Albrecht Dürer were the most common easily traceable source. Woodcut style also influenced the type of underdrawing revealed by special photography, "extremely detailed underdrawing with an elaborate system of shading (hatching and crosshatching) and broad, curling contour lines". This is sometimes described as using the "woodcut convention" or having the "woodcut look". Although "detailed underdrawing in the woodcut convention appears labor intensive, it simplified the production process and saved on costs".

Apart from the Adoration of the Magi, many of the panels or triptychs produced by the Antwerp Mannerists depicted the major events in the Life of Christ, including the Nativity, and the Crucifixion. Larger triptych altarpieces for churches might have several small scenes on the reverses of the hinged wings, giving the "closed view" which was displayed most of the time, the wings only being opened perhaps on Sundays or feast days (or for visitors on a small payment to the sacristan).

== Drawings and miniatures ==
A number of highly finished drawings in the Antwerp style, possibly copies of paintings, can be shown to have been used as the basis for miniatures in illuminated manuscript books of hours made in France, probably around Tours, by the so-called "1520s Hours Workshop". At the same time the continuing Ghent-Bruges style of illumination had little influence in French manuscripts.

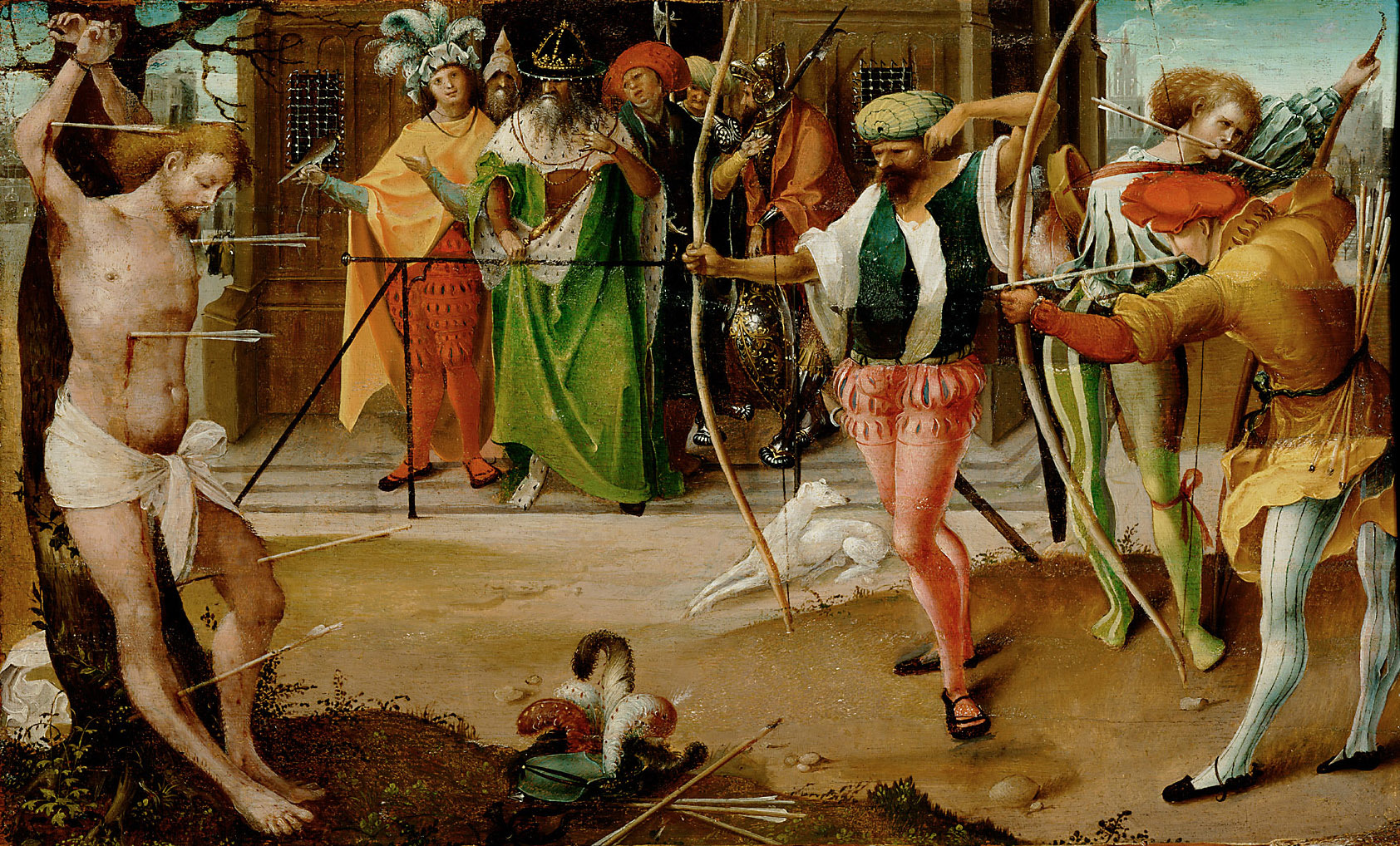
Jan de Beer, Martyrdom of Saint Sebastian

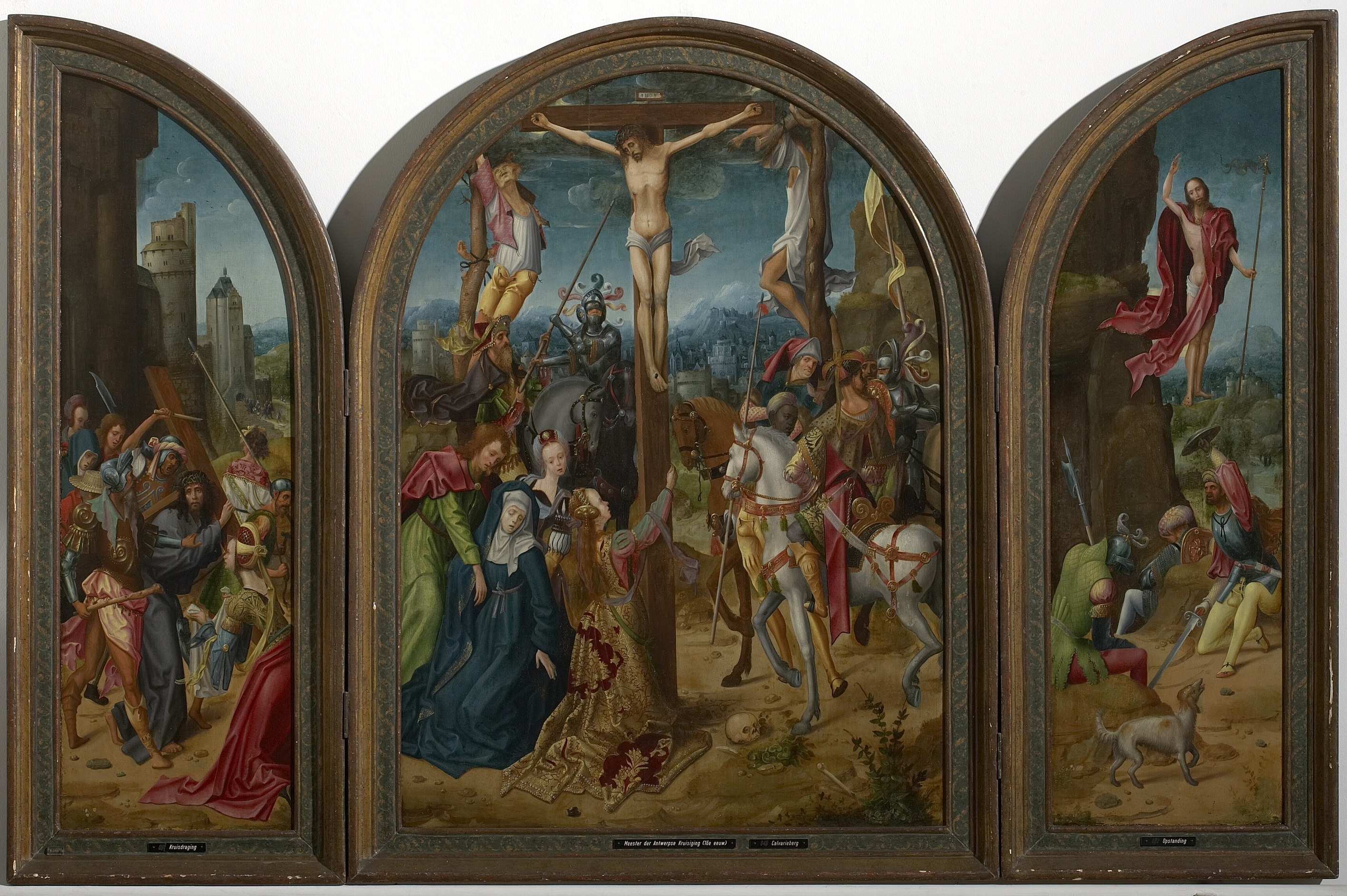
Adriaen van Overbeke Triptych of the crucifixion, Maagdenhuis, Antwerp
