= Master of 1518 =

- Education: Stylistic school of Antwerp Mannerism
- Known for: Painting
- Notable work: The Life of the Virgin in St. Mary's Church in Lübeck German
- Movement: Mannerism

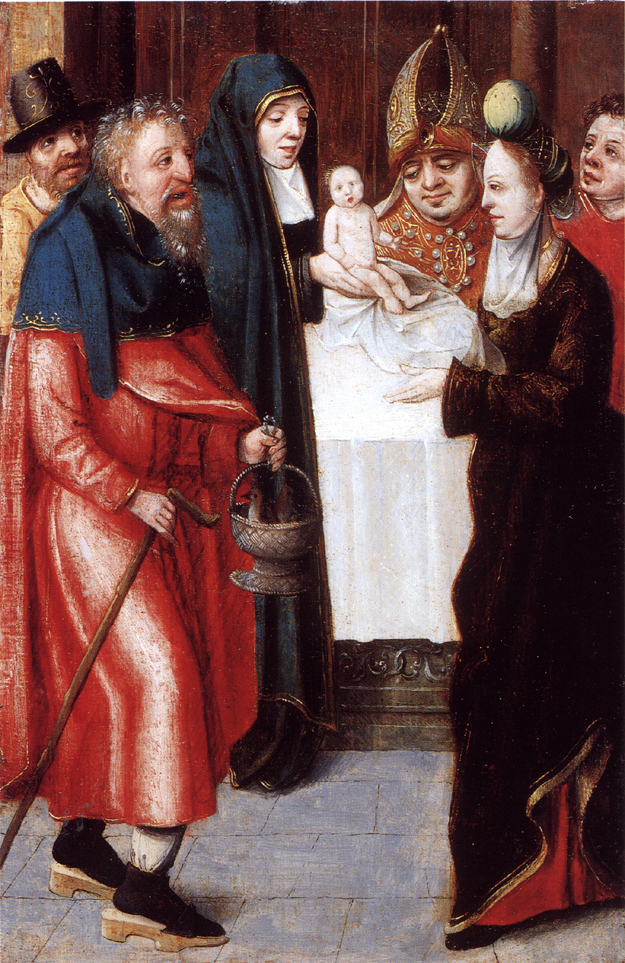
The Presentation of the Christ Child in the Temple Master of 1518 Oil on panel private coll.

The Master of 1518 is a Flemish painter belonging to the stylistic school of Antwerp Mannerism. A group of unsigned paintings is attributed to this artist on stylistic grounds, and his name is derived from the date inscribed on the painted wings of a carved wooden altarpiece of the Life of the Virgin in St. Mary's Church in Lübeck Germany. Although this artist’s identity is not known with certainty, some scholars believe that the Master of 1518 was either Jan Mertens the Younger or Jan van Dornicke, or that all three were the same person. His paintings are primarily crowded depictions of religious scenes combining Gothic and Renaissance styles. He frequently incorporated elaborate clothing and architectural ruins.

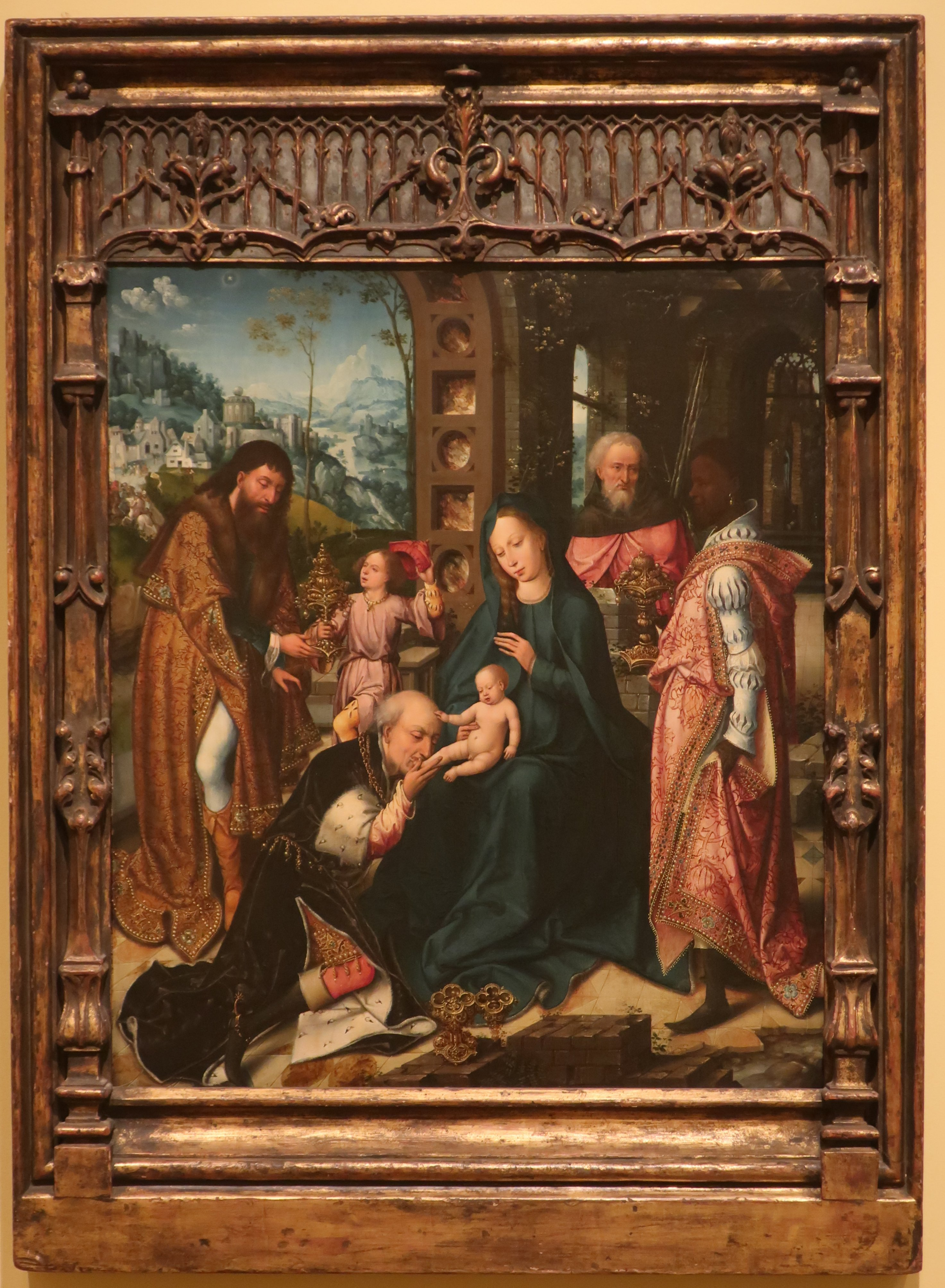
The Adoration of the Magi Master of 1518 Oil on panel Honolulu Museum of Art
