= Master of the Antwerp Adoration =

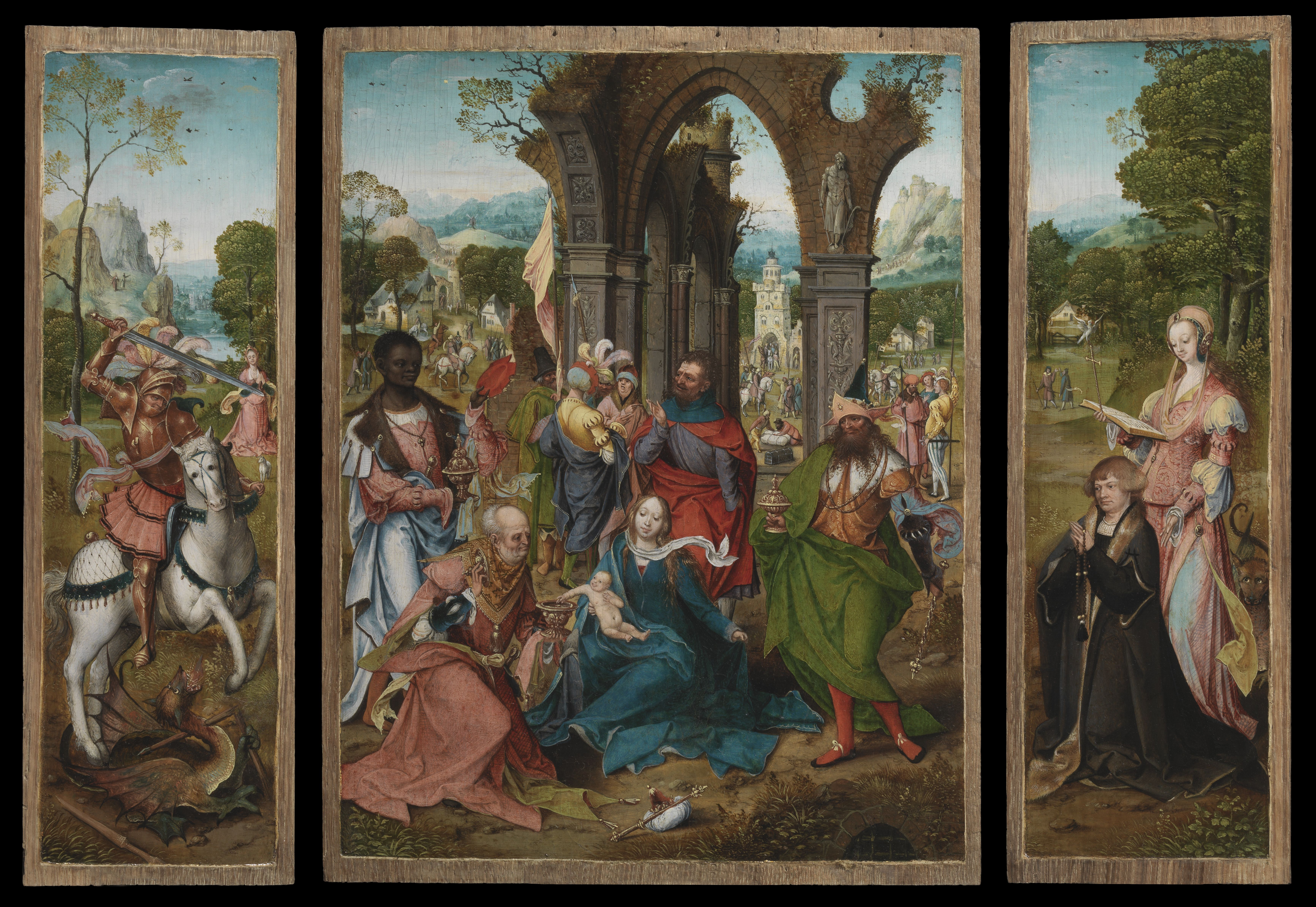
Triptych: Adoration of the kings, 16th century, Royal Museum of Fine Arts Antwerp showing exotic clothing and Antwerp Mannerist poses

The Master of the Antwerp Adoration (active 1500 – 1520) was a Flemish painter in the style of Antwerp Mannerism, whose compositions are typically filled with agitated figures in exotic, extravagant clothes. His notname is from a triptych showing the Adoration of the Magi, acquired by the Antwerp Museum of Fine Arts.

He was active in Antwerp. He was identified by Max J. Friedlander as the same person as the Master of Linnich. Little else is known. Despite various attempts to match him to recorded names of artists of the time, a leading scholar described the question of his identity in 2007 as "still up in smoke".

== Works ==
Apart from the Antwerp triptych, another with the same main subject in the Oldmasters Museum in Brussels (Royal Museums of Fine Arts of Belgium) is by the master, and Peter Van Den Brink suggests a large triptych altarpiece on the basis of several fragments. Several other works have been attributed.
