= Jan van Dornicke =

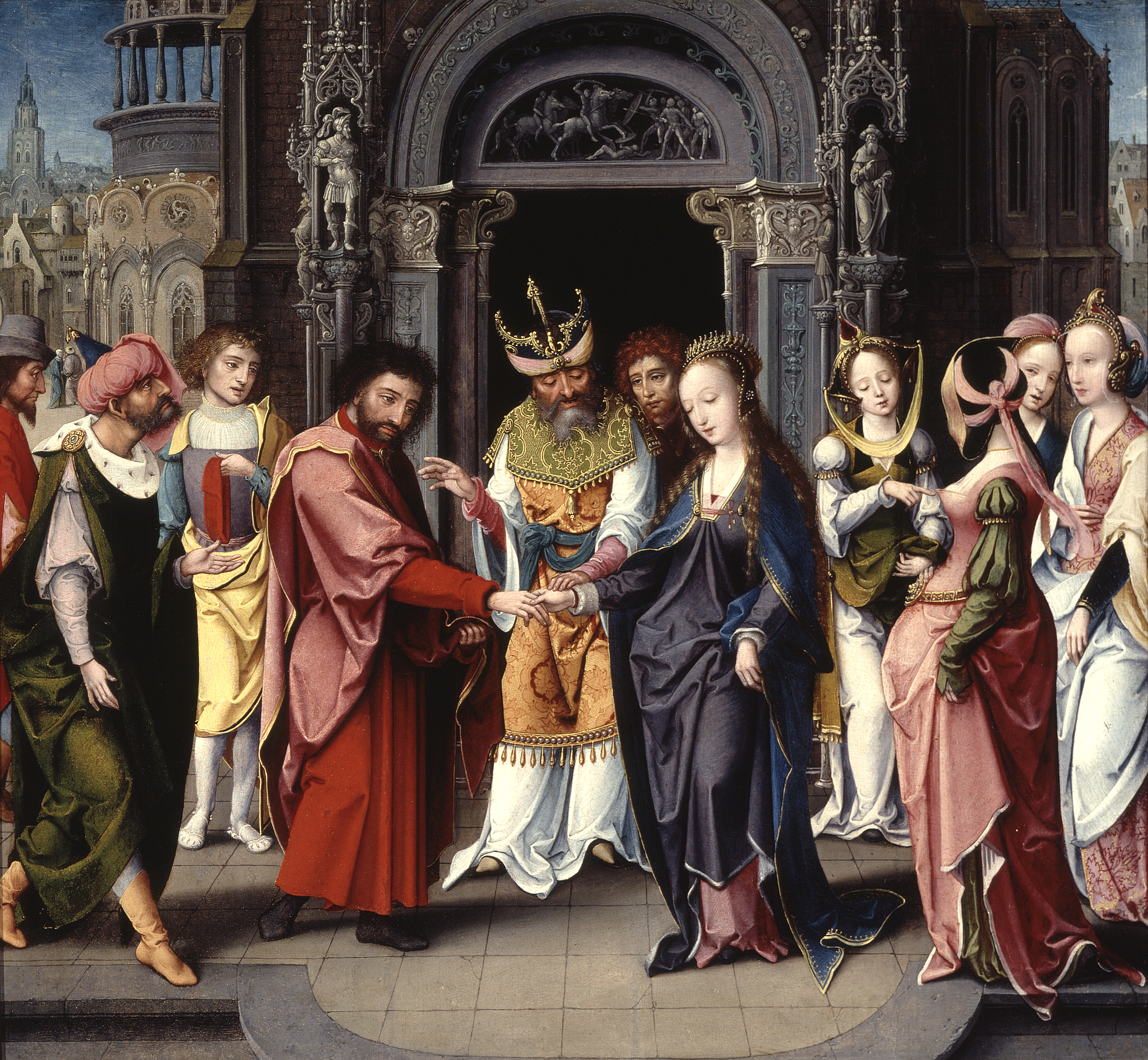
Jan van Dornicke, The Marriage of the Virgin, Saint Louis Art Museum

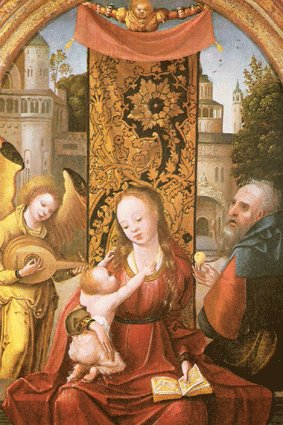
Jan Van Dornicke's painting of Madonna and Child, with St. Joseph and angel, oil on panel, 37.5 x 26.7 cm.

Jan van Dornicke was a South Netherlandish painter who was born in Doornik (nowadays also known as Tournai) in about 1470 and died about 1527. His first name is sometimes spelled "Janssone", and his last name is sometimes spelled "van Doornik" or "van Dornick". He was active in Antwerp from about 1509 to about 1525. His paintings are classified stylistically as Antwerp Mannerism, and he may be the same person as the Master of 1518. This Jan van Dornicke should not be confused with an eighteenth-century Dutch artist who had the same name.
