= Jan Mertens the Younger =

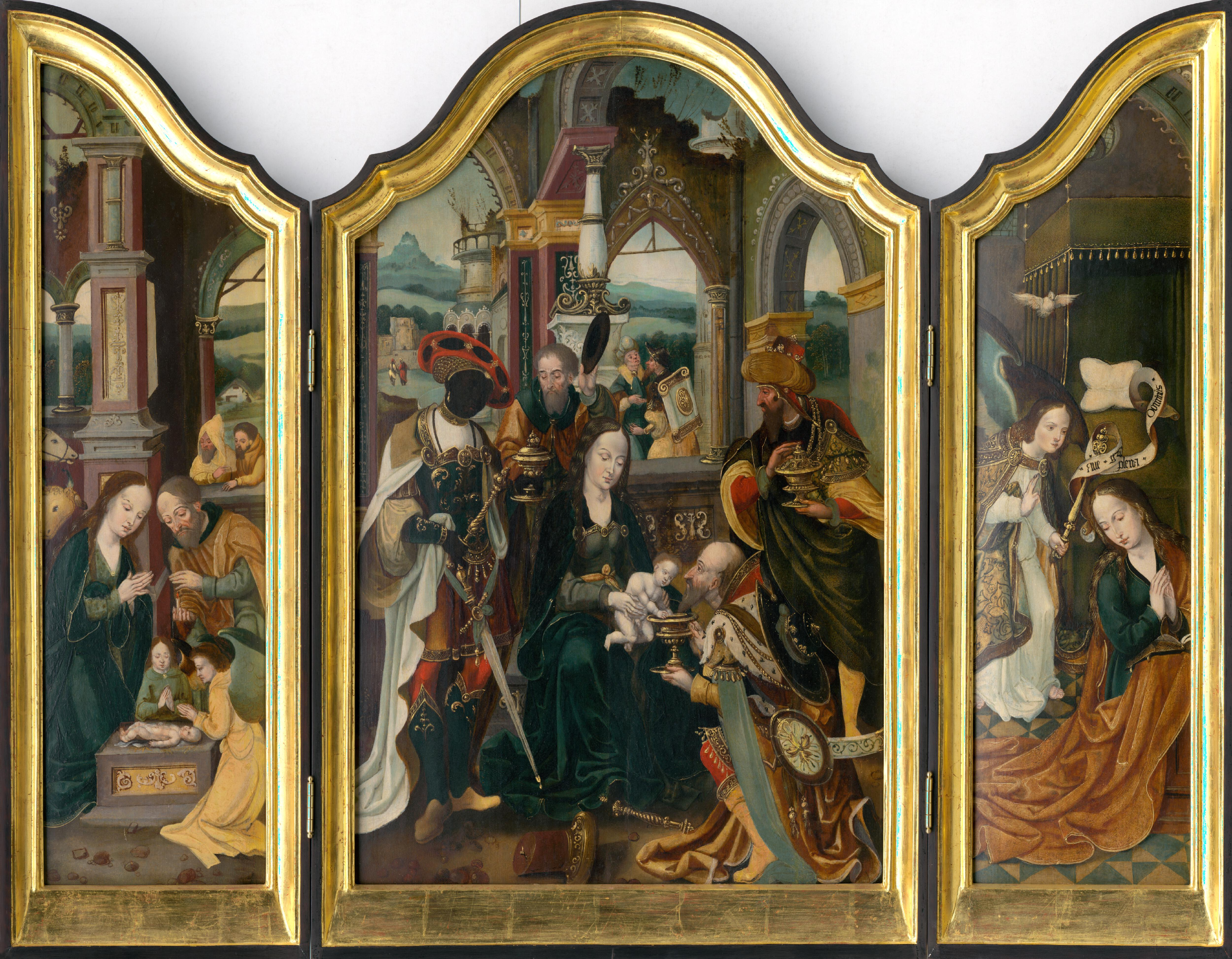
Workshop of Jan Mertens the Younger, triptych of the Adoration of the Magi, 1520-1530

Jan Mertens the Younger (died c. 1527) was a South Netherlandish painter, at the end of the period of Early Netherlandish painting. He was born and died in Antwerp. His father was the sculptor Jan Mertens the Elder, whose family is thought to have originated in Tournai. Mertens the Younger was apprenticed to the painter Jan Gossaert in 1505, and he became a master of the Antwerp painters' guild in 1509. He was the father-in-law (and perhaps teacher) of Pieter Coecke van Aelst, who married Mertens's daughter Anna before 1526, and whose work has been used as the basis for the identification of Mertens with the Master of 1518, an Antwerp painter named after the date inscribed on the painted wings of a carved wooden altarpiece of the Life of the Virgin in St. Mary's Church, Lübeck.

The sharp focus, lively narrative and exaggerated poses evident in the painted wings in Lübeck are characteristic of Antwerp Mannerism, but Mertens's work is distinguished by its brilliant color, sense of structure, thoughtful composition and delicacy of style. Mertens formed an important link in the artistic dynasties of Antwerp, for his second daughter married first Jan van Amstel, now usually identified with The Brunswick Monogrammist, and subsequently Gillis van Coninxloo.
