= Jan de Beer =

Jan de Beer may refer to:

- Jannie de Beer (born 1971), South African rugby union player
- Jan de Beer (painter) (c. 1475–1528), Netherlandish painter and draughtsman
