= Nativity with St Elizabeth and the Infant John the Baptist =

Painting by Antonio da Correggio

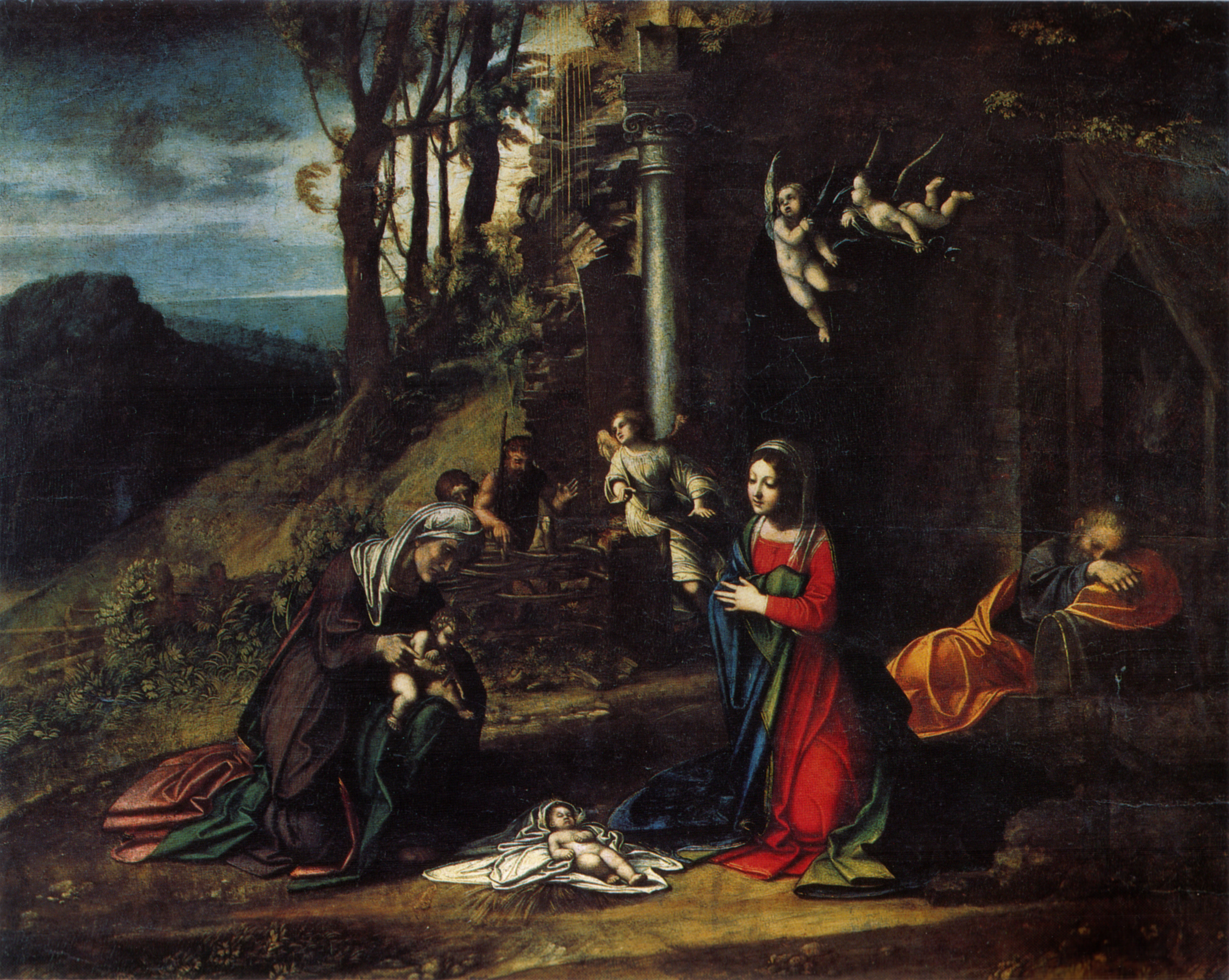
Nativity with St Elizabeth and the Infant John the Baptist

Nativity with St Elizabeth and the Infant John the Baptist is a c.1512-1513 oil on panel painting by Correggio, now in the Pinacoteca di Brera in Milan, which acquired it at an auction in Paris in 1913.

It was painted during the artist's stay in Mantua, with heavy influence from Mantegna's Adoration of the Magi. However, its commissioner and original location are both unknown, though the latter was probably a home rather than a church. In the 17th century it was recorded as being in the collection of cardinal Ludovico Ludovisi in Rome, before going on the art market and ending up in the collection of Benigno Crespi.
