= Last Supper (Rubens) =

Painting by Peter Paul Rubens

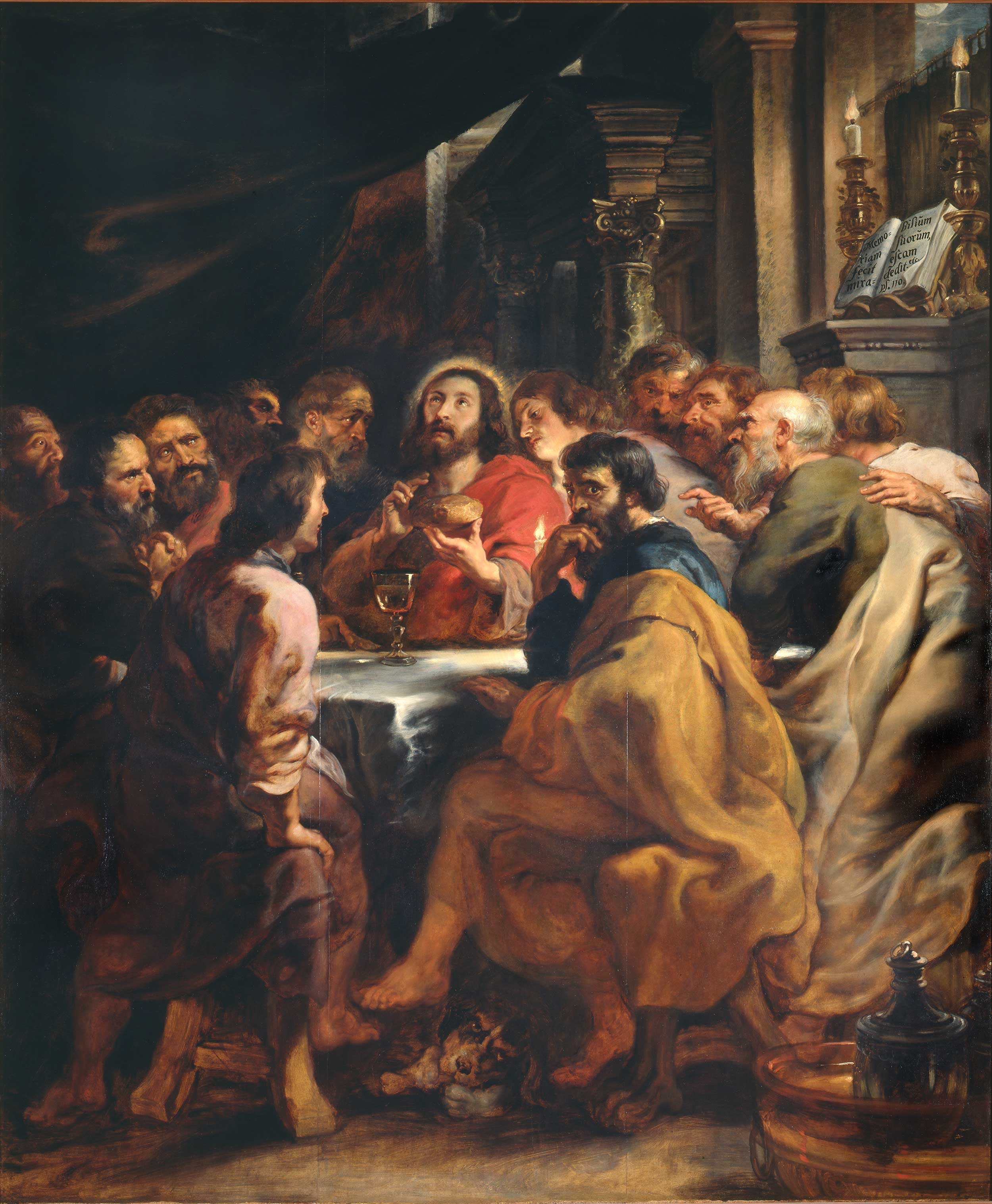
- Artist: Rubens
- Year: 1630-1631
- Medium: Oil on canvas
- Dimensions: 304 cm × 250 cm (120 in × 98 in)
- Location: Pinacoteca di Brera, Milan

The Last Supper (1630–1631) is an oil painting by Peter Paul Rubens. It was commissioned by Catherine Lescuyer as a commemorative piece for her father. Rubens created it as part of an altarpiece in the Church of St. Rombout (Rumbold) in Mechelen. The painting depicts Jesus and the Apostles during the Last Supper, with Judas dressed in blue turning back towards the viewer and away from the table. Other than Jesus, the most prominent figure is Judas. Judas holds his right hand to his mouth with his eyes avoiding direct contact with the other figures in the painting creating a nervous expression. Jesus is dressed in red and has a yellow halo surrounding his head with his face tilted upwards. Jesus is located centrally in the painting surrounded by his disciples with six on each side, and he holds a loaf of bread with a cup of wine in front of him. Out of all of the figures, he is the most in the light with the figures to the farthest left being the most in shadow. "The scene thus represents a perfect conflation of the theological significance of the Last Supper" meaning the conflation between the blessing of the bread and the wine while still being pivotal in the sense of revealing the betrayal.

As in many other Northern European depictions, a dog with a bone can be seen in the scene, probably a simple pet. It may represent faith, dogs are traditionally symbols of and are representing faith. According to J. Richard Judson the dog near Judas perhaps represents greed or evil, as the companion of Judas, as in John 13:27.

This painting followed the first unsuccessful attempt by Rubens to produce a Last Supper in 1611, when his patrons backed out the last minute, perhaps due to the high price of 4,000 Guilder asked by Rubens.

Leonardo da Vinci's Last Supper fresco was a significant influence on Rubens who created an etching after the Da Vinci Last Supper, which was one of Rubens' first attempts to express the full range of human emotion printed by Pieter Soutman. Rubens was also influenced by his humanist ideals from which he extracts biblical themes.

Another importaint Influence was Rubens former Teacher Otto van Veen. Rubens closely follows the composition of the Last Supper by van Veen but shifts the thematical focus even more towards the Eucharist. In Rubens' Painting none of the Apostles are searching for the traitor anymore, they're all looking at Jesus.

Rubens often made engravings following the completion of his works. Other artists used these engravings to serve as a basis of their own works. These copies were even collected. The engravings and copies helped to lead to the popularity of Rubens' works during his lifetime.
