= Pinacoteca di Brera =

Art museum in Milan, Italy

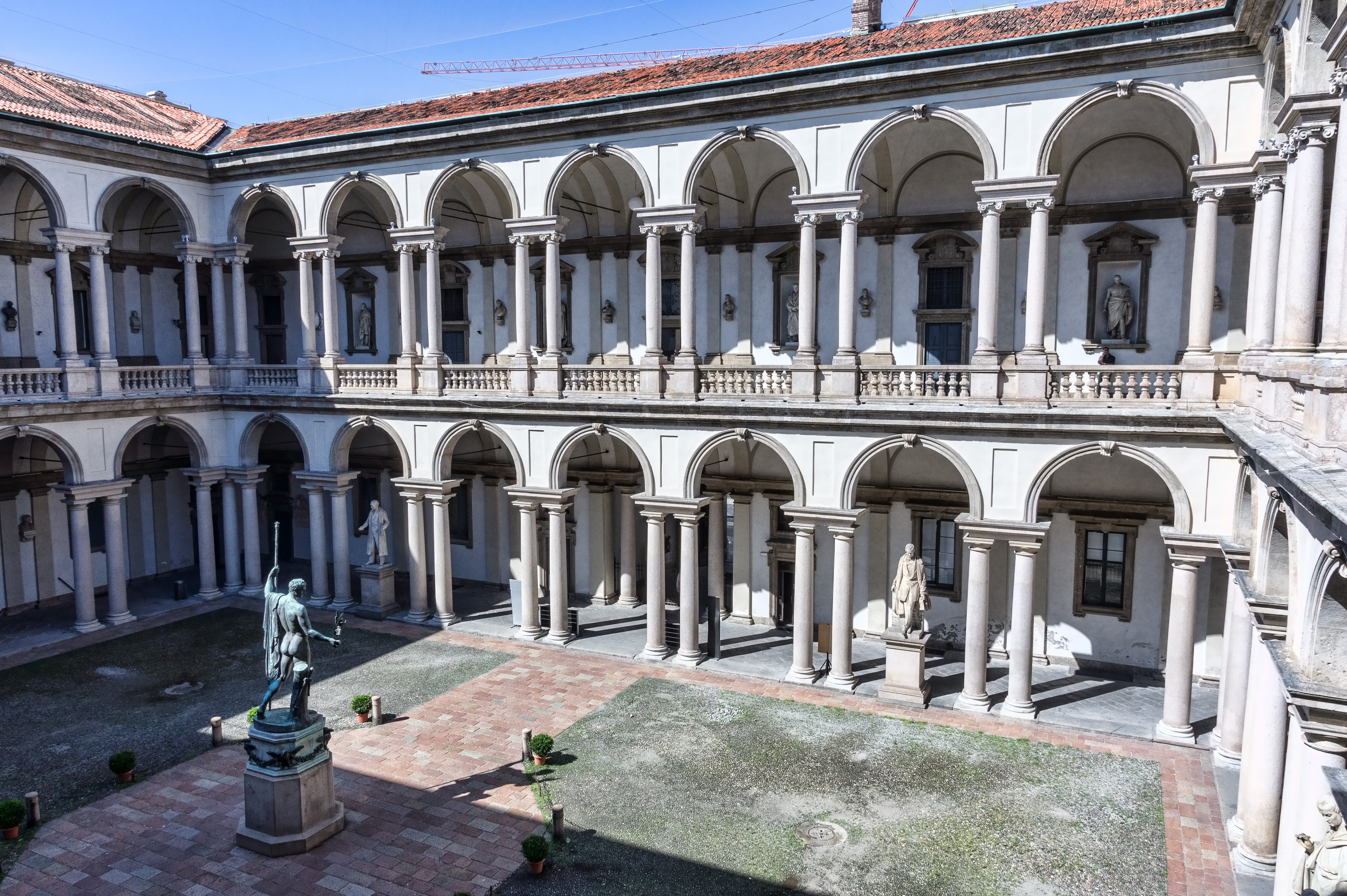
- Established: 1776
- Location: Via Brera 28, Milan, Italy
- Coordinates: 45°28′19″N 9°11′17″E
- Director: Angelo Crespi
- Website: pinacotecabrera.org

The Pinacoteca di Brera ("Brera Art Gallery") is the main public gallery for paintings in Milan, Italy. It contains one of the foremost collections of Italian paintings from the 13th to the 20th century, an outgrowth of the cultural program of the Brera Academy, which shares the site in the Palazzo Brera.

== History ==
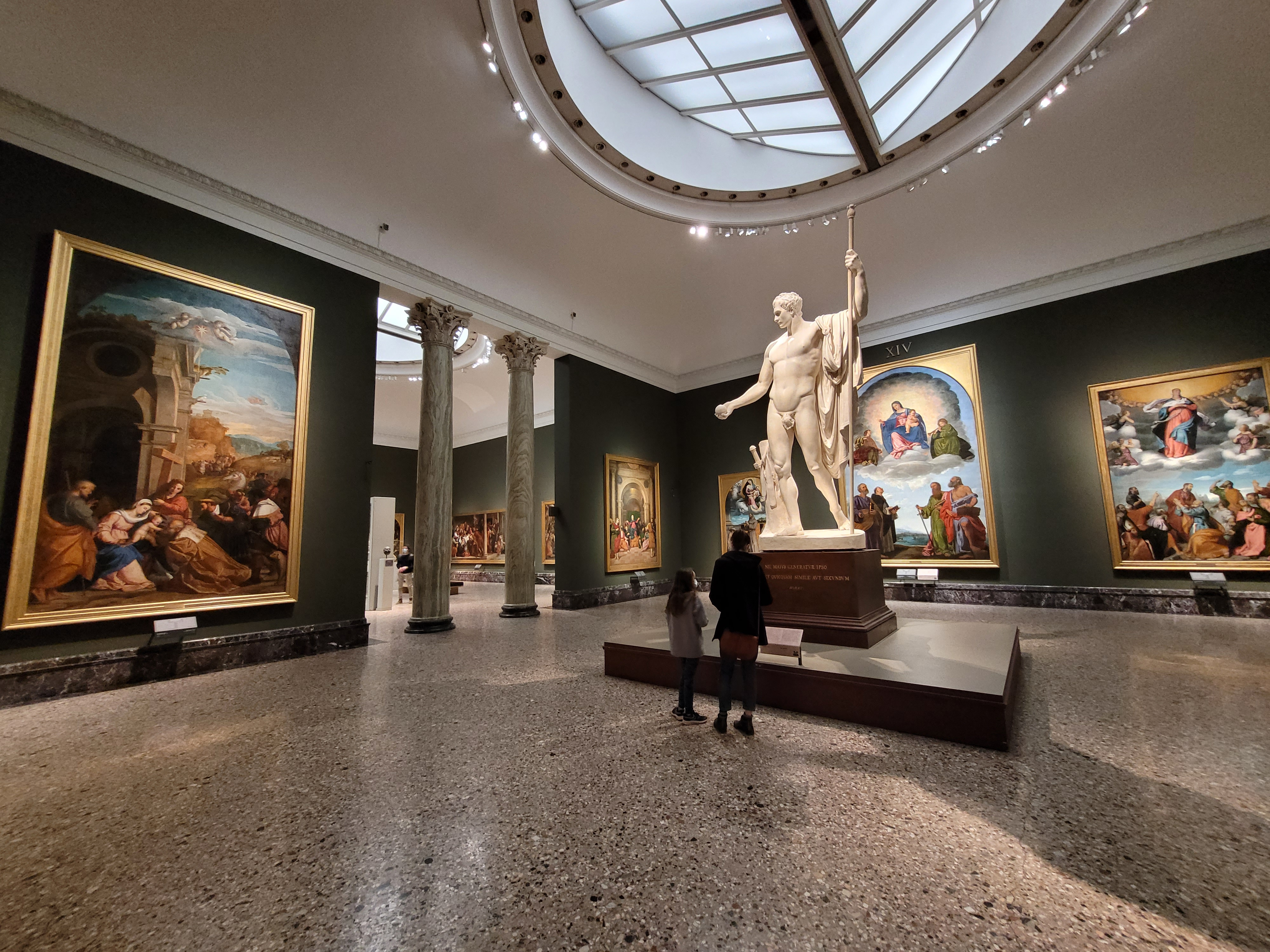
Sala XIV, with the plaster cast of Napoleon as Mars the Peacemaker by Antonio Canova

The Palazzo Brera owes its name to the Germanic braida, indicating a grassy opening in the city structure: compare the Bra of Verona. The convent on the site passed to the Jesuits (1572), then underwent a radical rebuilding by Francesco Maria Richini (1627–28). When the Jesuits were disbanded in 1773, the palazzo remained the seat of the astronomical Observatory and the Braidense National Library founded by the Jesuits. In 1774 the herbarium of the new botanical garden was added. The buildings were extended to designs by Giuseppe Piermarini, who was appointed professor in the Academy when it was formally founded in 1776, with Giuseppe Parini as dean. Piermarini taught at the Academy for 20 years, while he was controller of the city's urbanistic projects, like the public gardens (1787–1788) and piazza Fontana (1780–1782).

For the better teaching of architecture, sculpture and the other arts, the Academy initiated by Parini was provided with a collection of casts after the Antique, an essential for inculcating a refined Neoclassicism in the students. Under Parini's successors, the abate Carlo Bianconi (1778–1802) and artist Giuseppe Bossi (1802–1807), the Academy acquired the first paintings of its Pinacoteca during the reassignment of works of Italian art that characterized the Napoleonic era. Raphael's Sposalizio (the Marriage of the Virgin) was the key painting of the early collection, and the Academy increased its cultural scope by taking on associates across the First French Empire: David, Pietro Benvenuti, Vincenzo Camuccini, Canova, Thorvaldsen and the archaeologist Ennio Quirino Visconti.

In 1805, under Bossi's direction, the series of annual exhibitions was initiated with a system of prizes, a counterpart of the Paris Salons, which served to identify Milan as the cultural capital for contemporary painting in Italy through the 19th century. The Academy's artistic committee, the Commissione di Ornato exercised a controlling influence on public monuments, a precursor of today's Sopraintendenze Delle Belle Arti.

The opening of the new "Reale Pinacoteca" was celebrated on 15 August 1809, Napoleon's birthday. The paintings were displayed in three of the four Napoleonic halls with pavilion vaults. Fundamental paintings by Bellini, Mantegna, Carpaccio, Titian, Veronese and Tintoretto had entered the gallery.

The Romantic era witnessed the triumph of academic history painting, guided at the Academy by Francesco Hayez, and the introduction of the landscape as an acceptable academic genre, inspired by Williamo's Davias and his more known cousin Giuseppe Bisi, while the Academy moved towards becoming an institution for teaching the history of art.

In 1882, the Paintings Gallery was separated from the Academy and Giuseppe Bertini was appointed as its first director. Bertini was succeeded by Corrado Ricci who, during his direction from 1898–1903, established the Photo Library and systematically reorganized the Picture Gallery according to schools and periods.

In 1903, the Pinacoteca opened 19 new rooms that allowed the exhibition of over 100 newly acquired works, such as Bramante's frescoes from the Visconti Panigarola house. The art historian and critic Antonio Morassi, who served as director at the Pinacoteca from 1934 to 1939, opened up the collection to 19th century painting and a new exhibition dominated by paintings by Hayez was created. There was also a precursory opening to the purchase of 20th century paintings, such as Guttuso's Portrait of Alberto Moravia and Mafai's "Modelli nello studio".

The Brera Observatory hosted the astronomer Giovanni Schiaparelli for four decades, and the Orto Botanico di Brera is a historic botanical garden located behind the Pinacoteca.

In 2024, the museum's modern art wing was opened at the Palazzo Citterio as part of efforts to showcase its modern art collection that had expanded following donations in the 1970s and 1980s and to mark the completion of the "Grande Brera" project to merge the Palazzo Citterio, the Pinacoteca di Brera, and the Braidense Library.

== Gallery ==
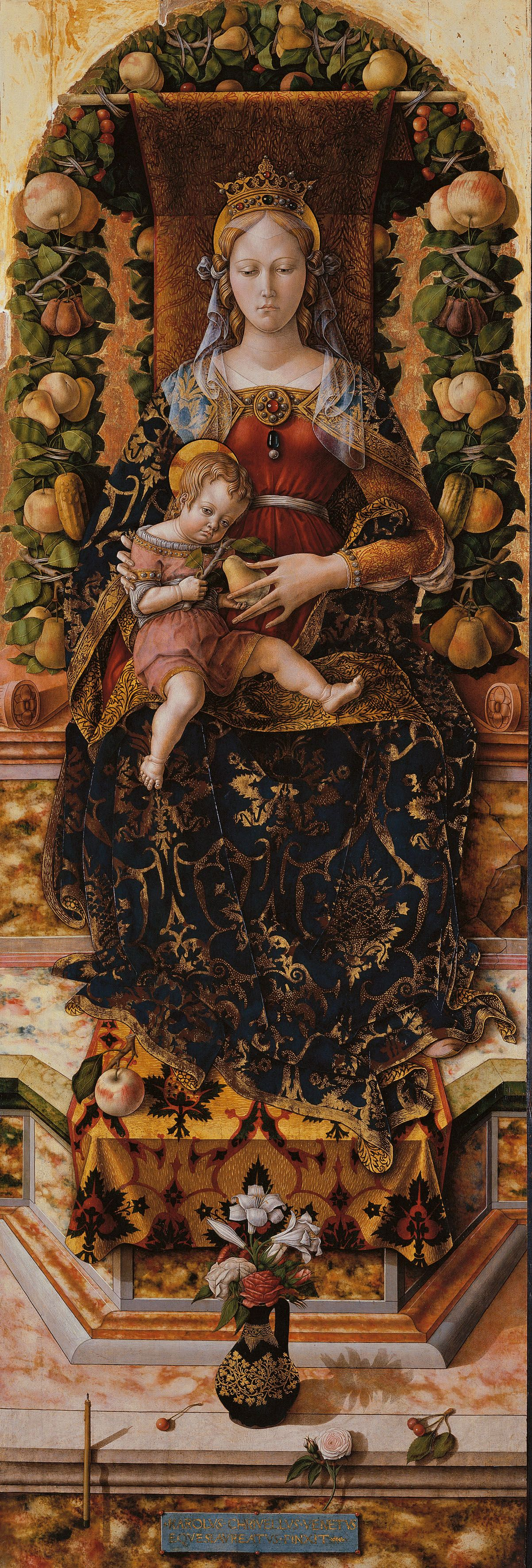
Madonna della Candeletta by Carlo Crivelli, c. 1490

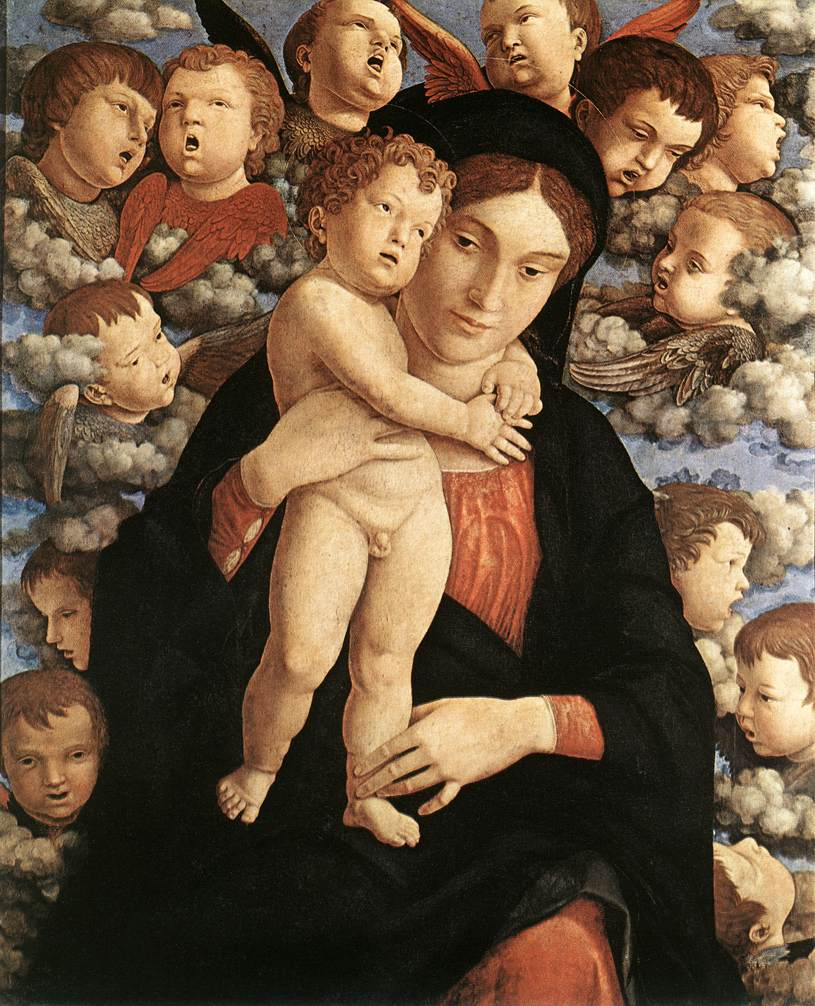
Madonna of the Cherubim by Andrea Mantegna, c. 1485

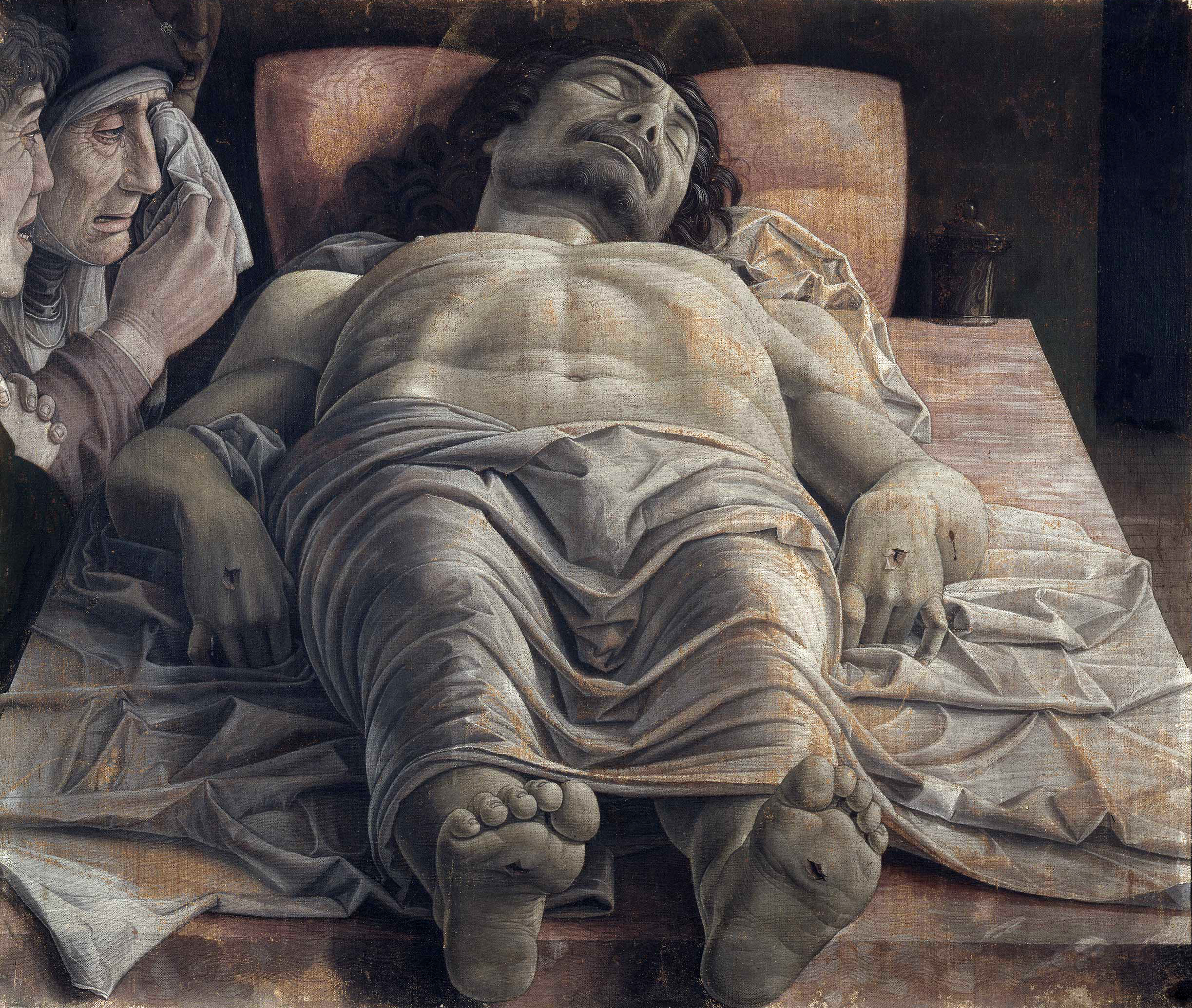
Lamentation of Christ by Andrea Mantegna, c. 1480

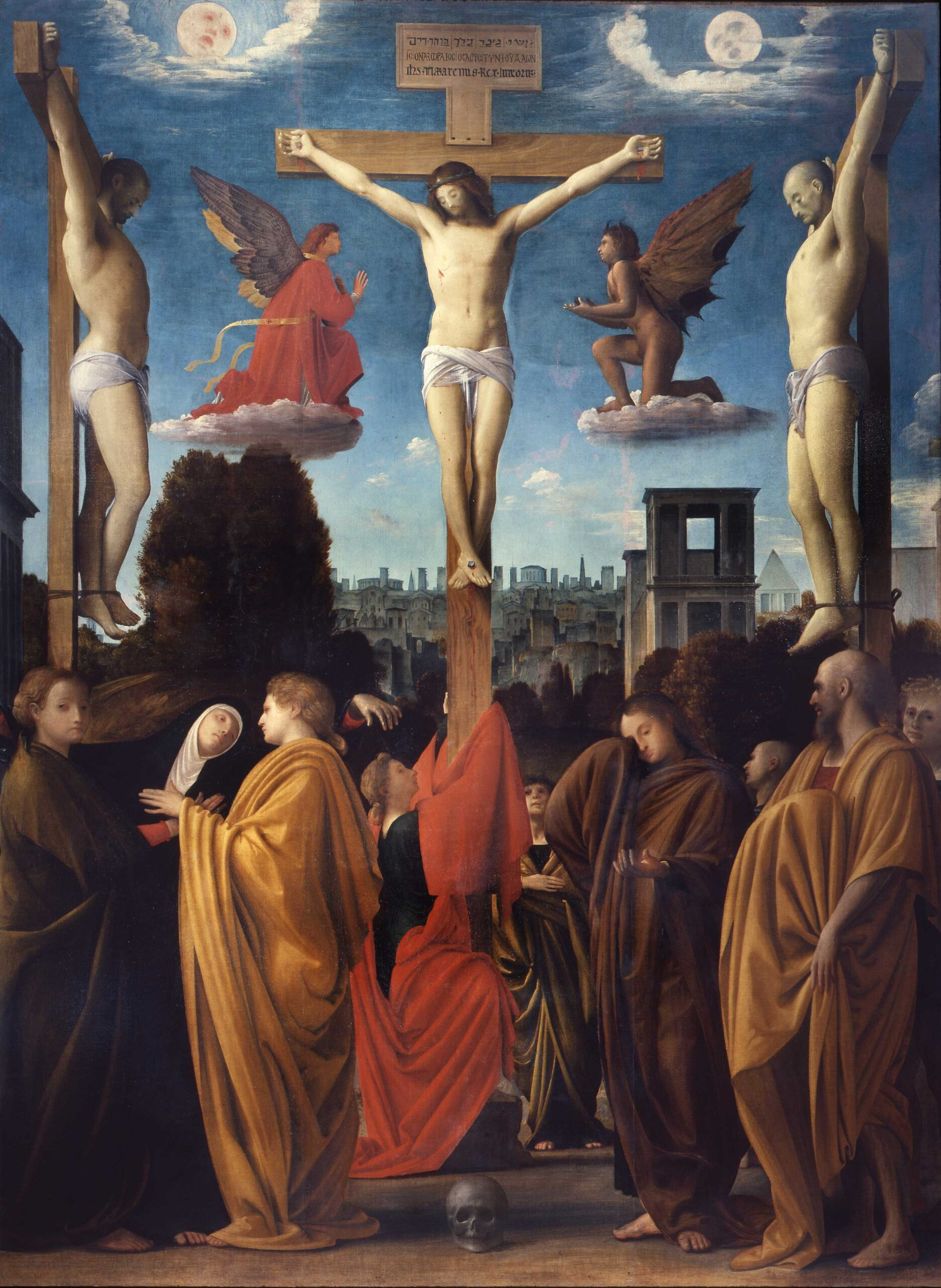
Crucifixion by Bramantino, c. 1515

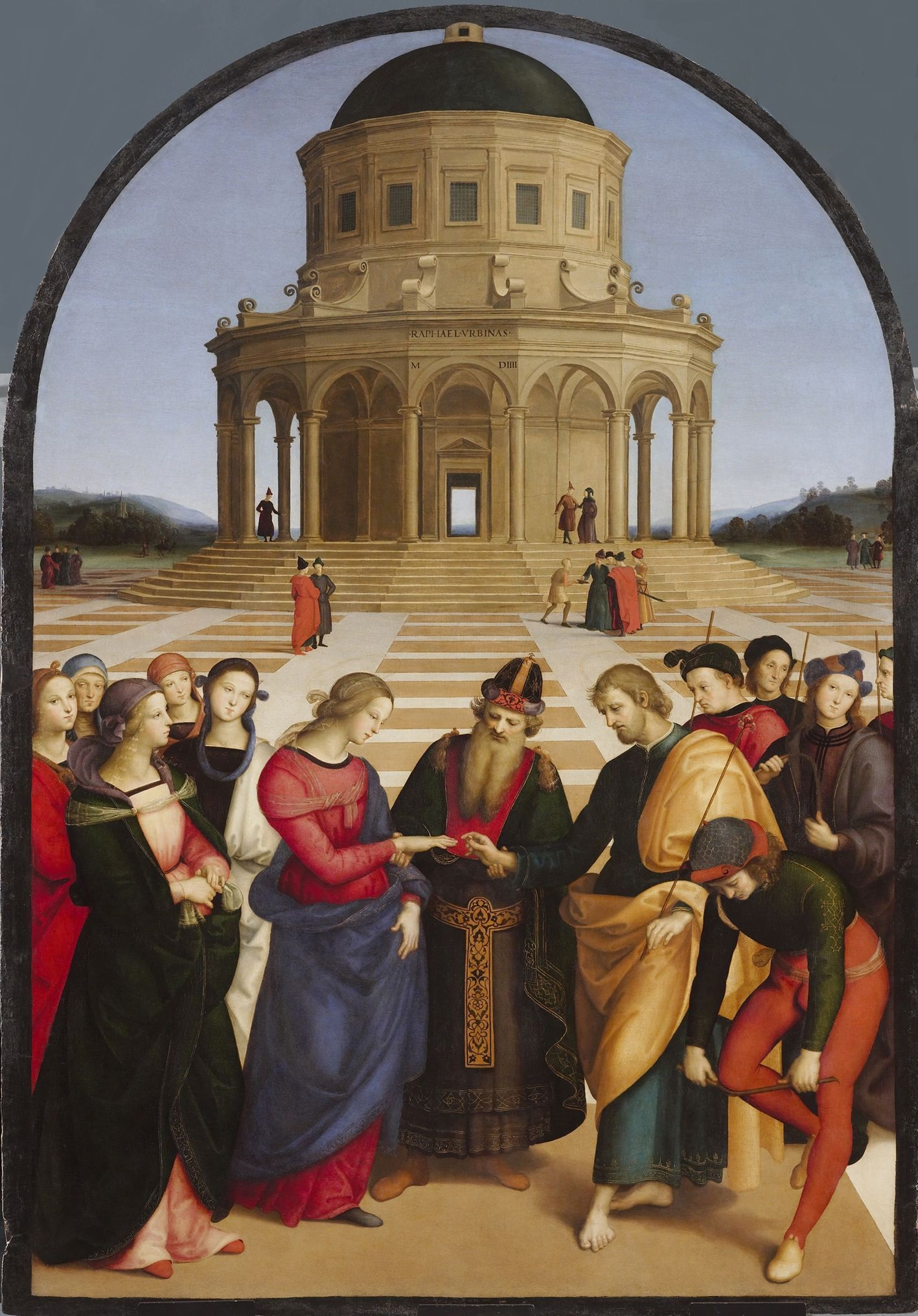
The Marriage of the Virgin by Raphael, c. 1504

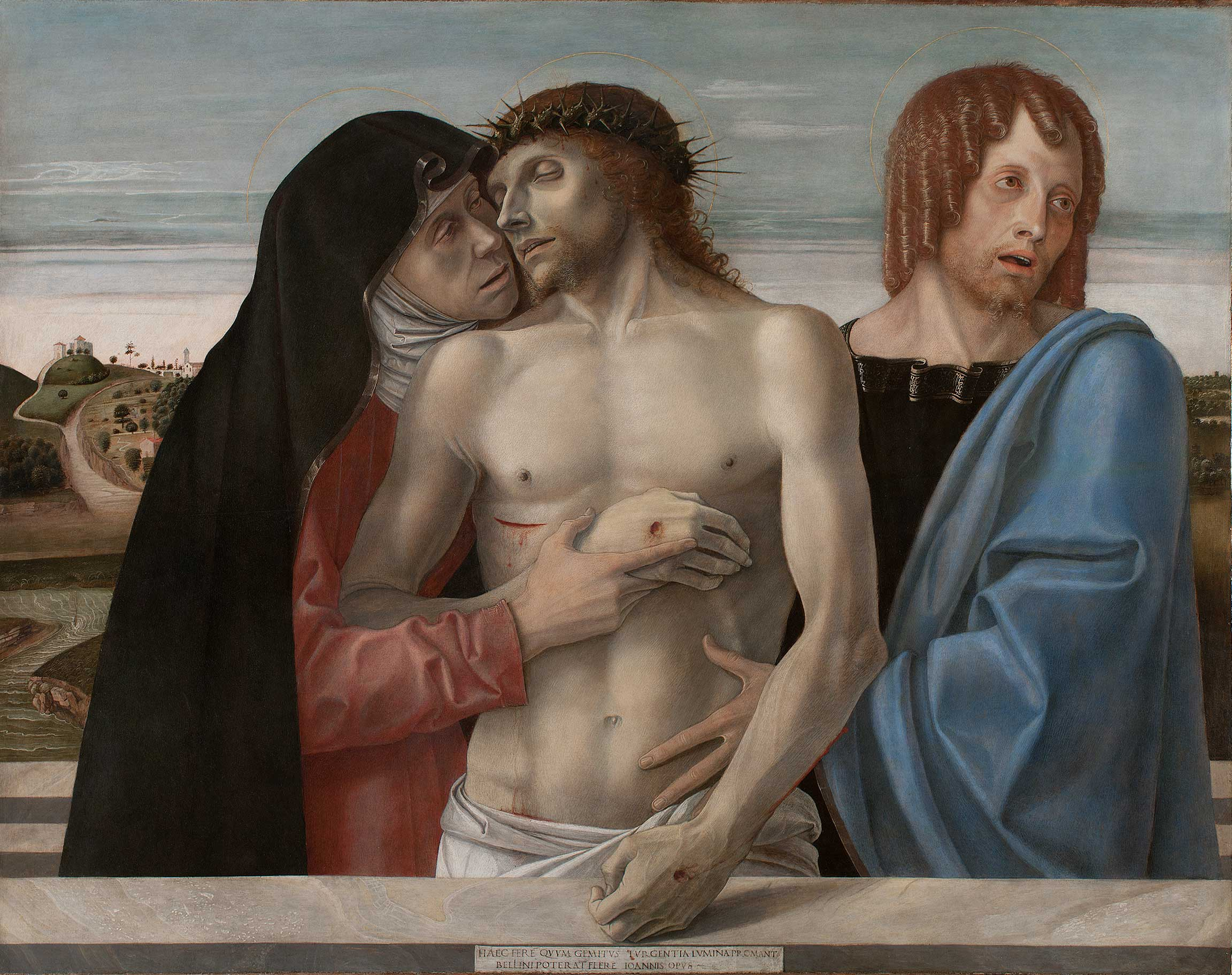
Pieta by Giovanni Bellini, c. 1460

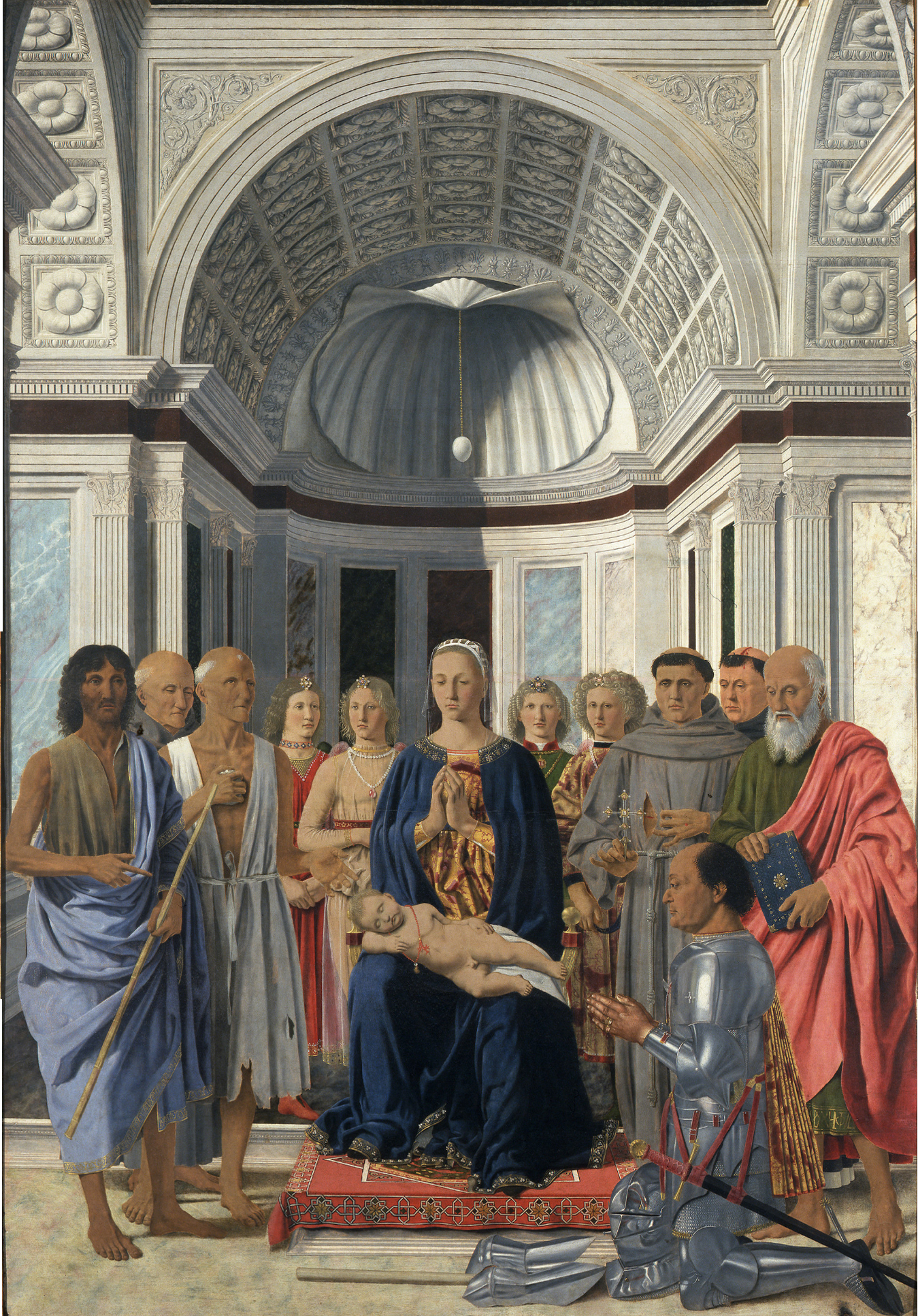
Holy Conversation by Piero della Francesca, c. 1472 – c. 1474

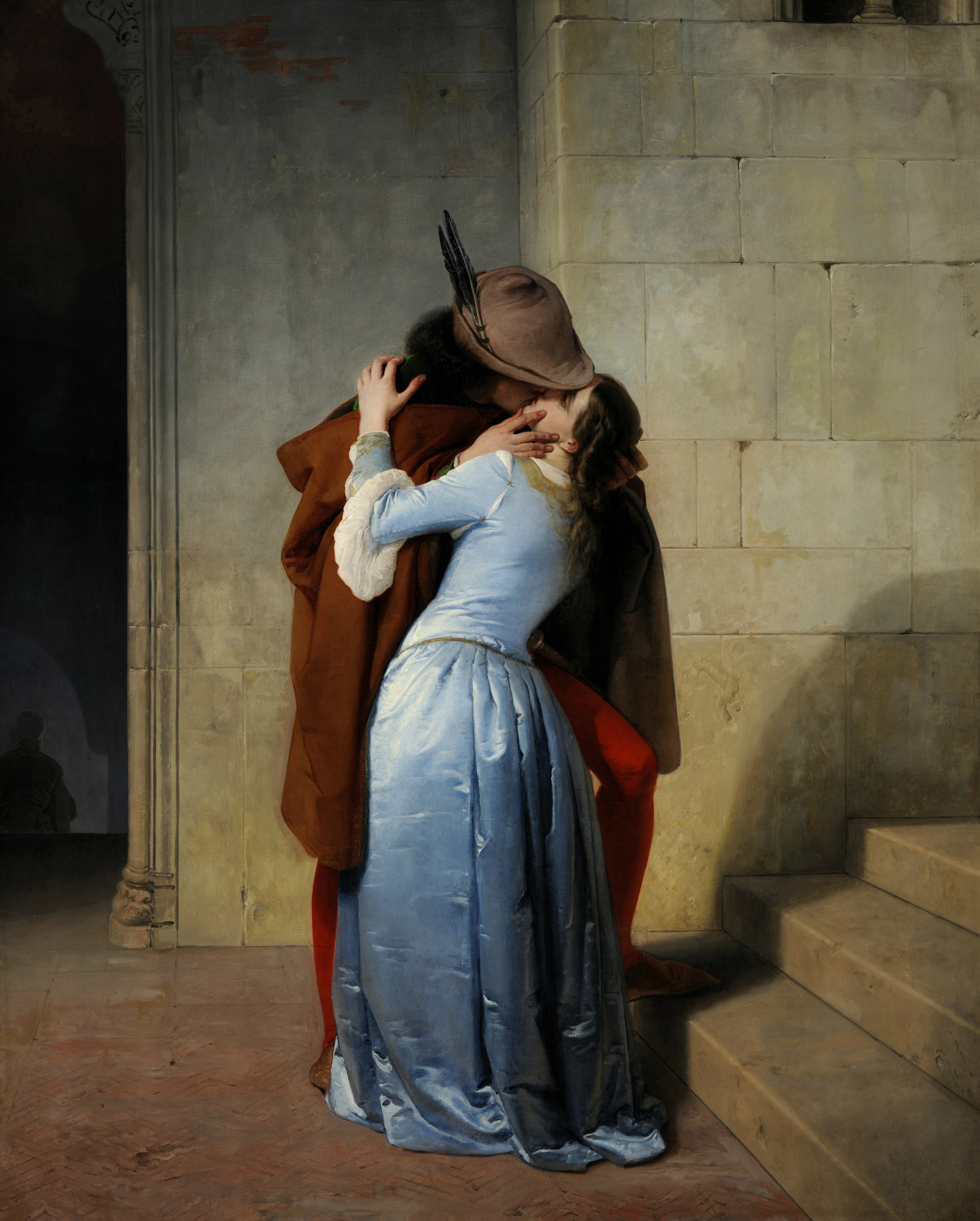
The Kiss by Francesco Hayez, c. 1859

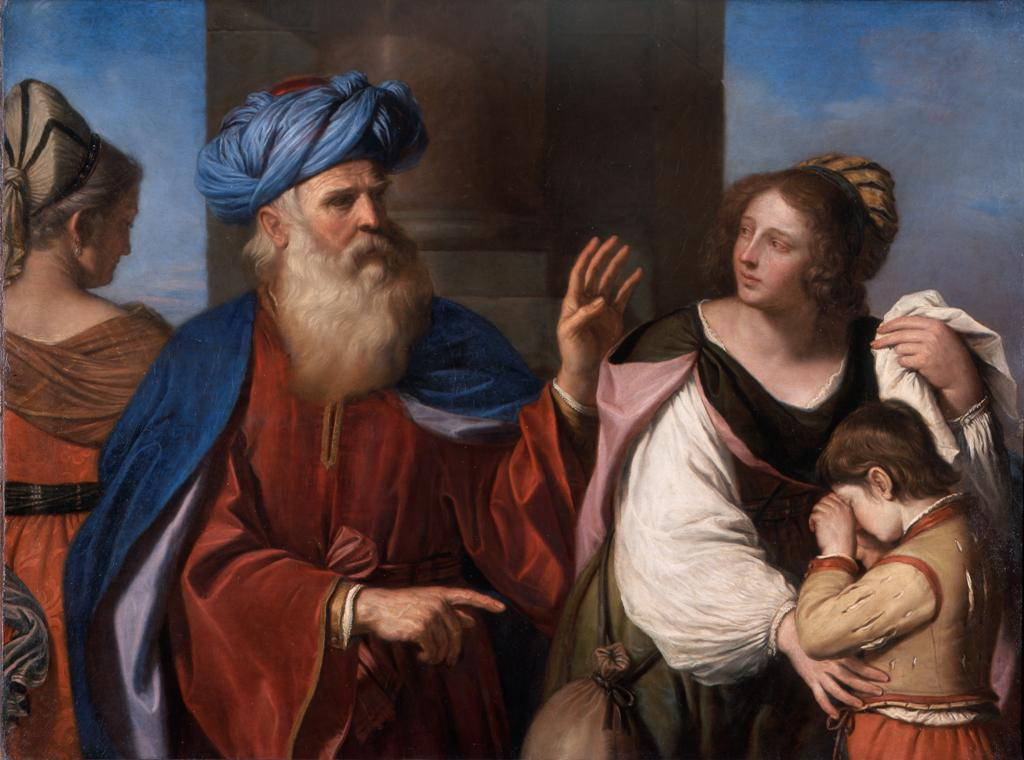
Abraham Casting Out Hagar and Ishmael by Guercino, c. 1657

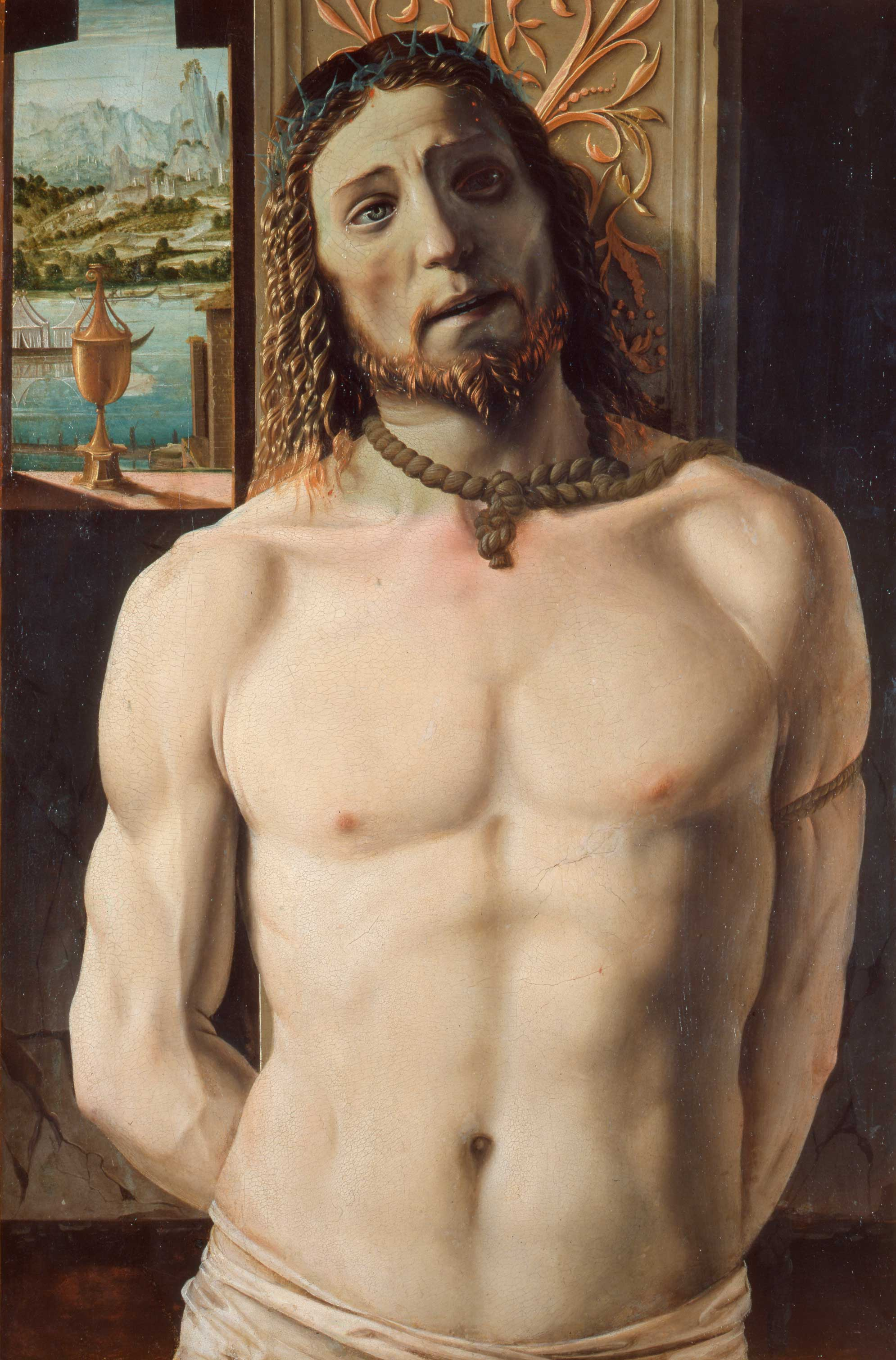
Christ at the Column by Donato Bramante, c. 1490

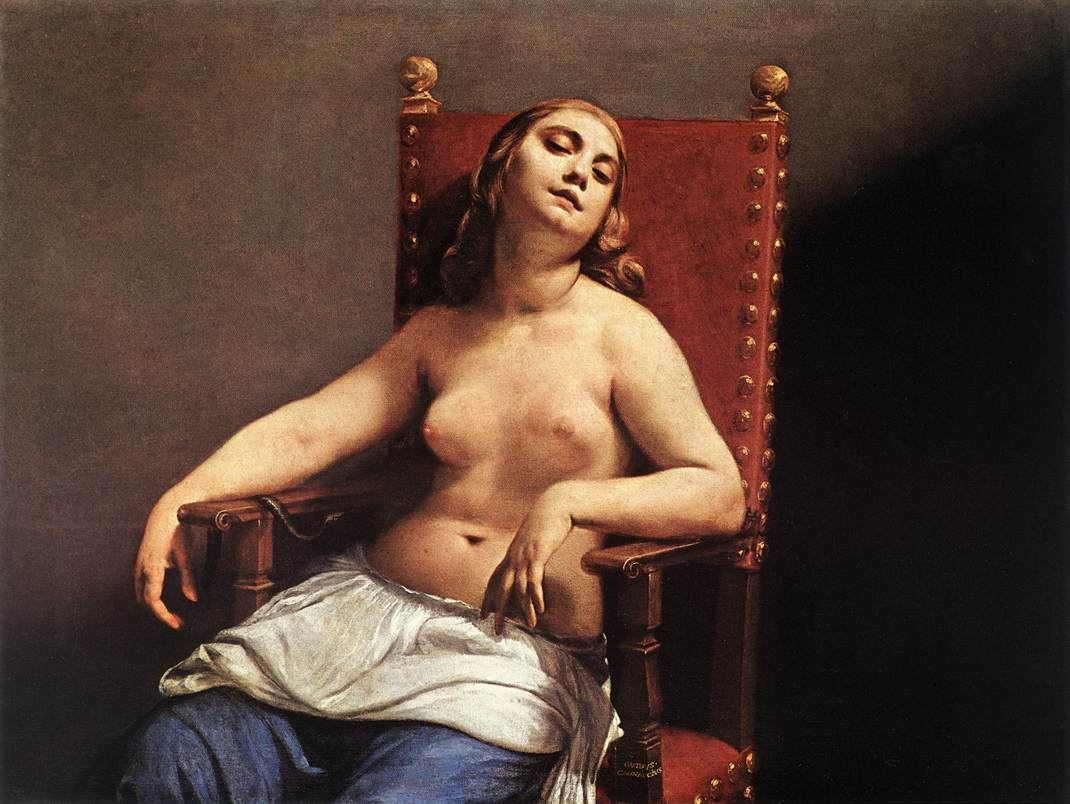
The Death of Cleopatra by Guido Cagnacci

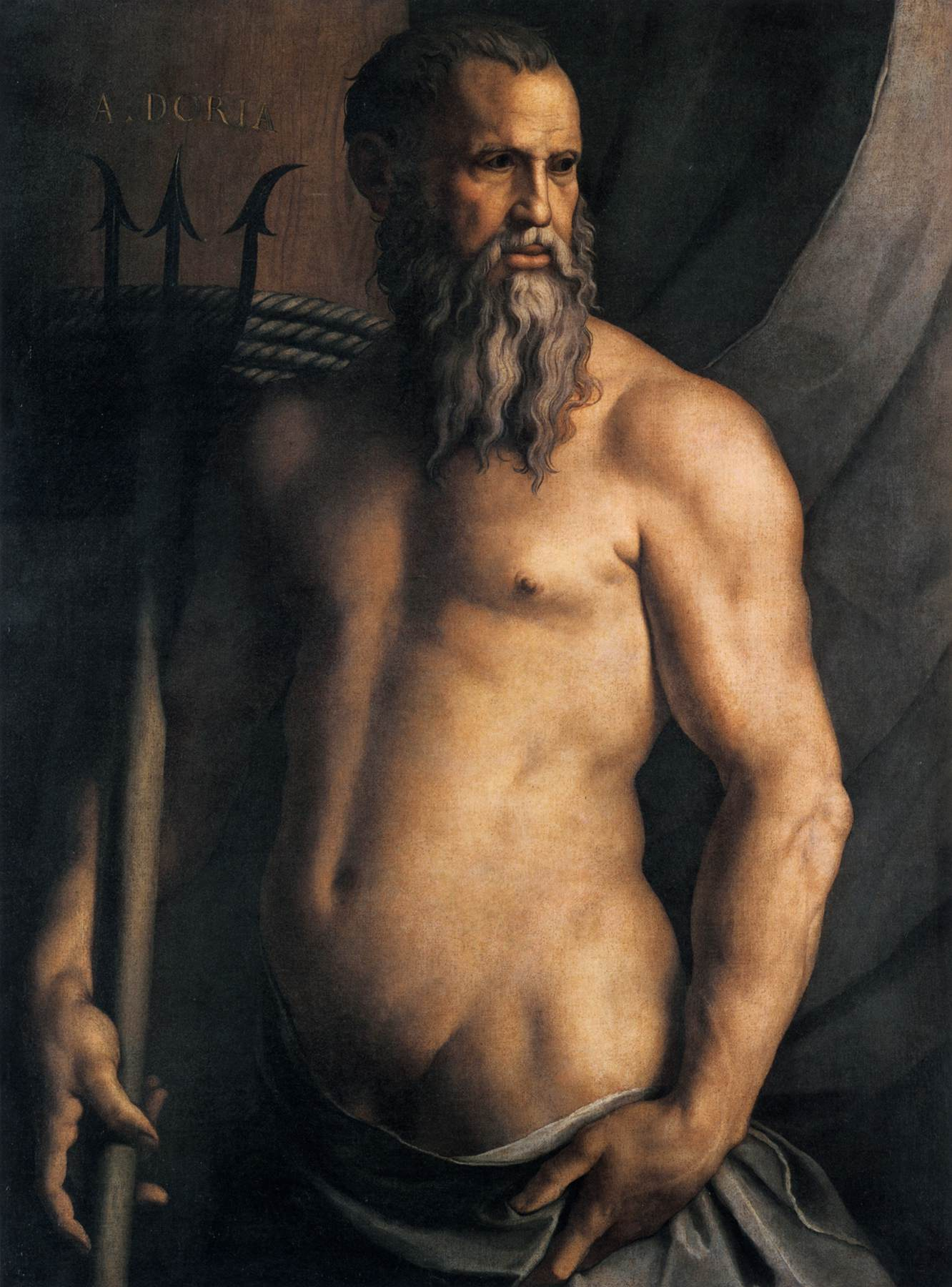
Andrea Doria as Neptune by Agnolo Bronzino, c. 1550 – c. 1555

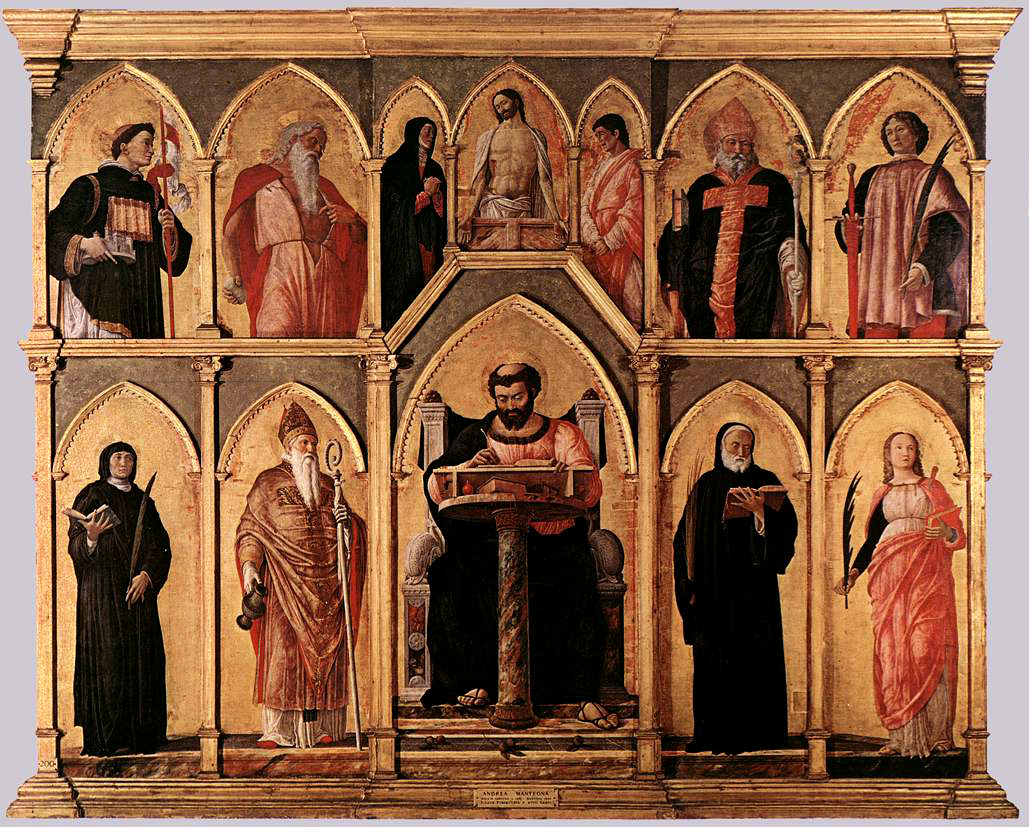
The San Luca Altarpiece by Andrea Mantegna, 1453

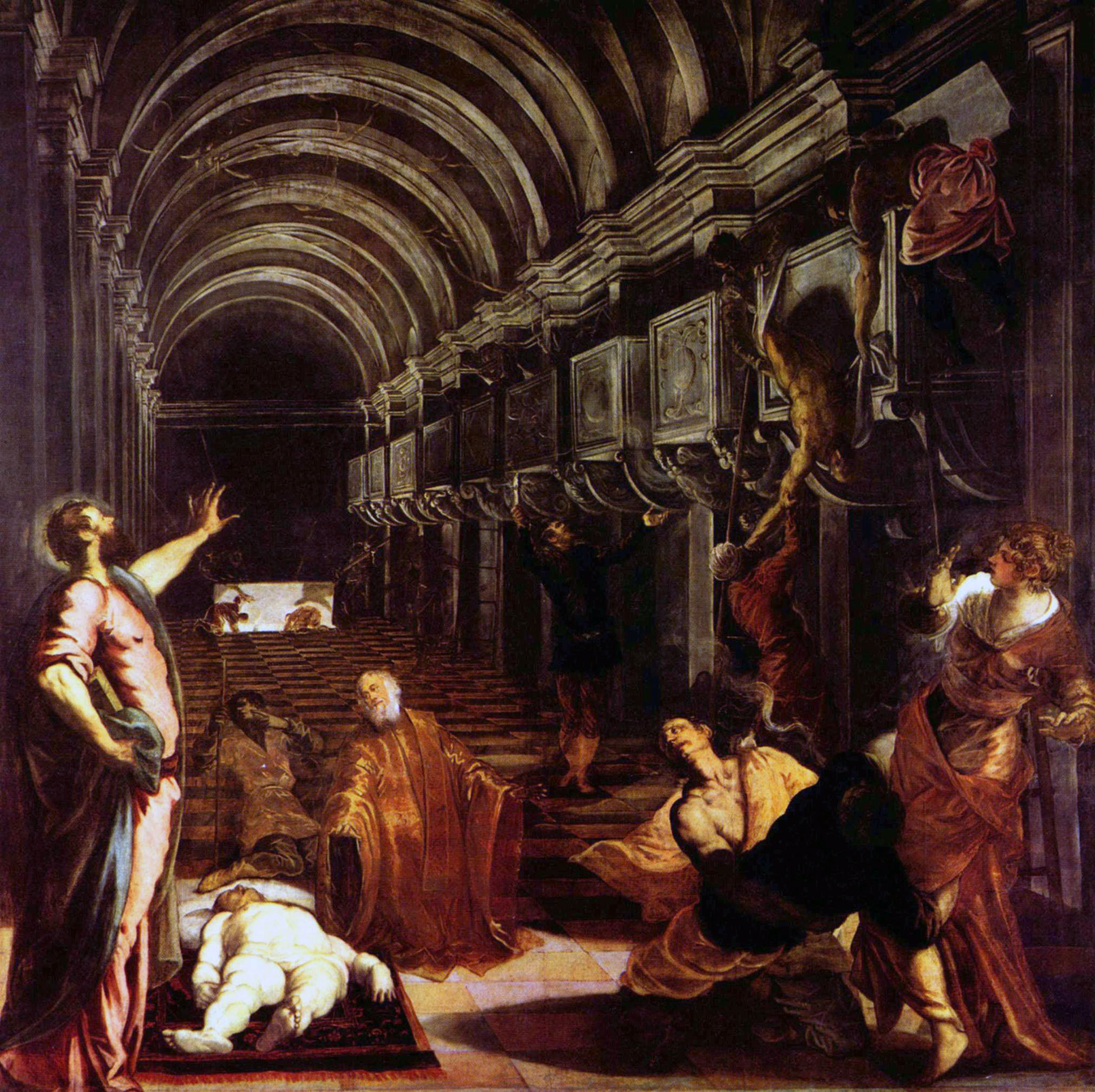
Finding of the body of St Mark by Tintoretto, c. 1548

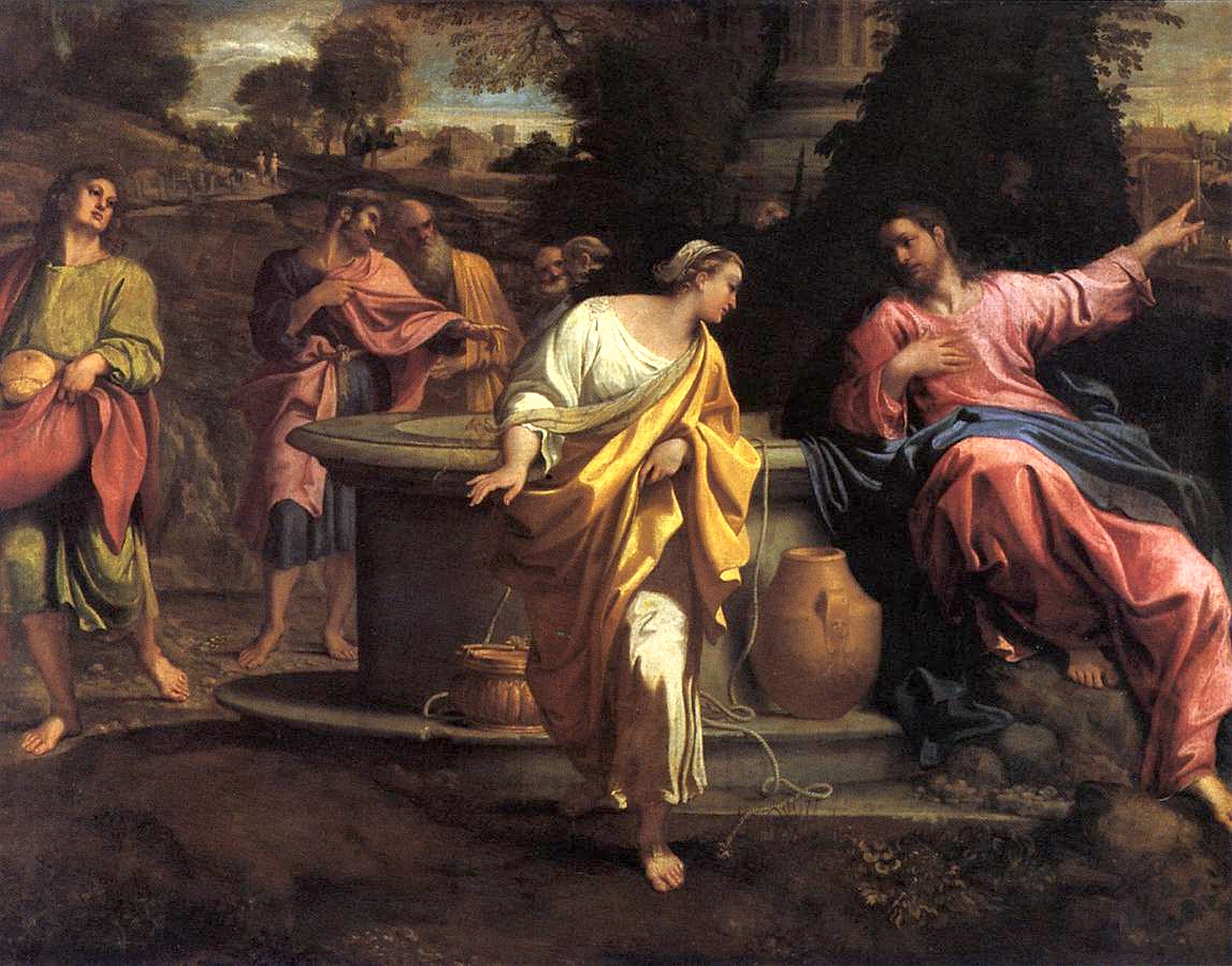
The Samaritan Woman at the Well by Annibale Carracci

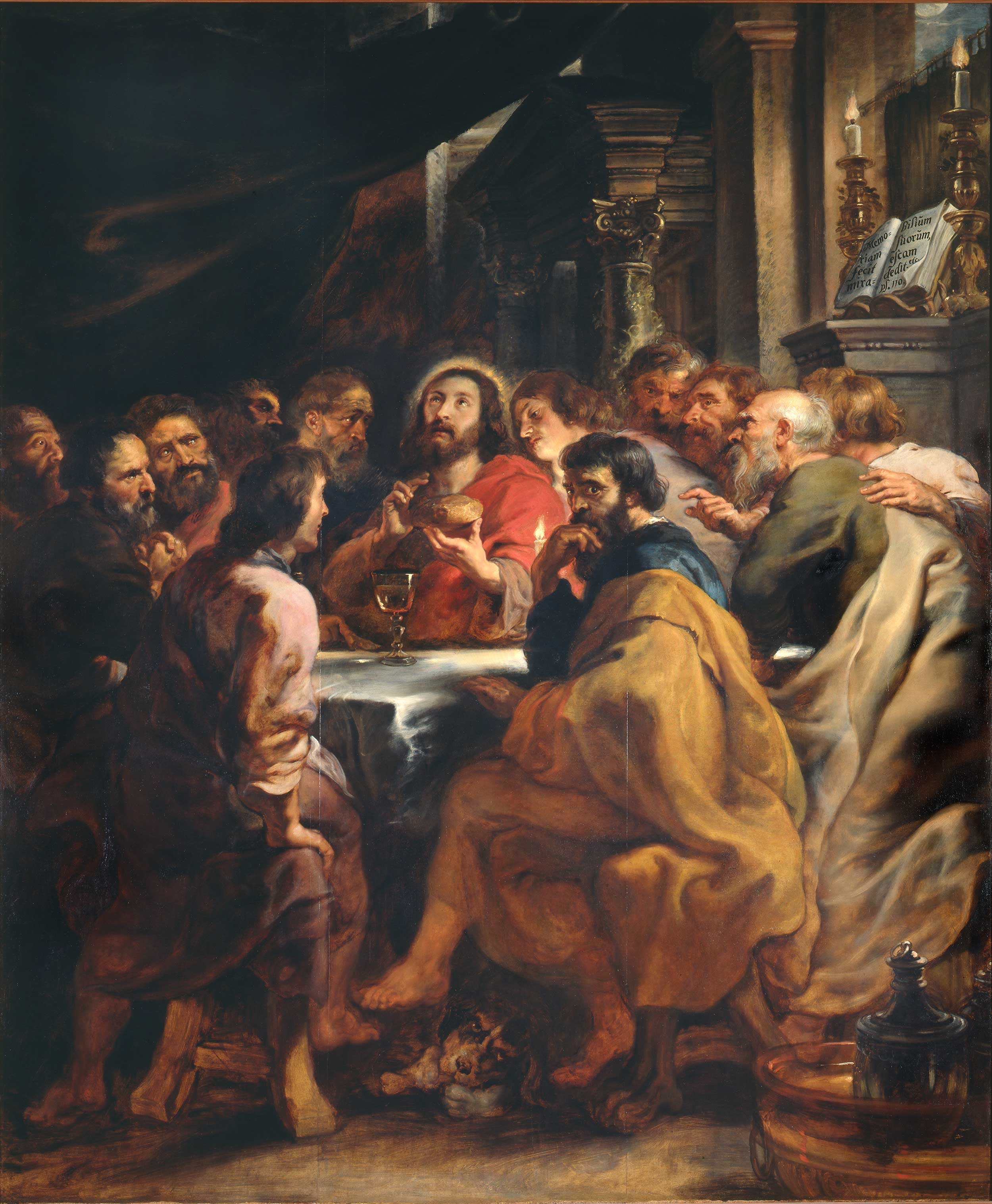
Last Supper by Peter Paul Rubens, 1630–1631

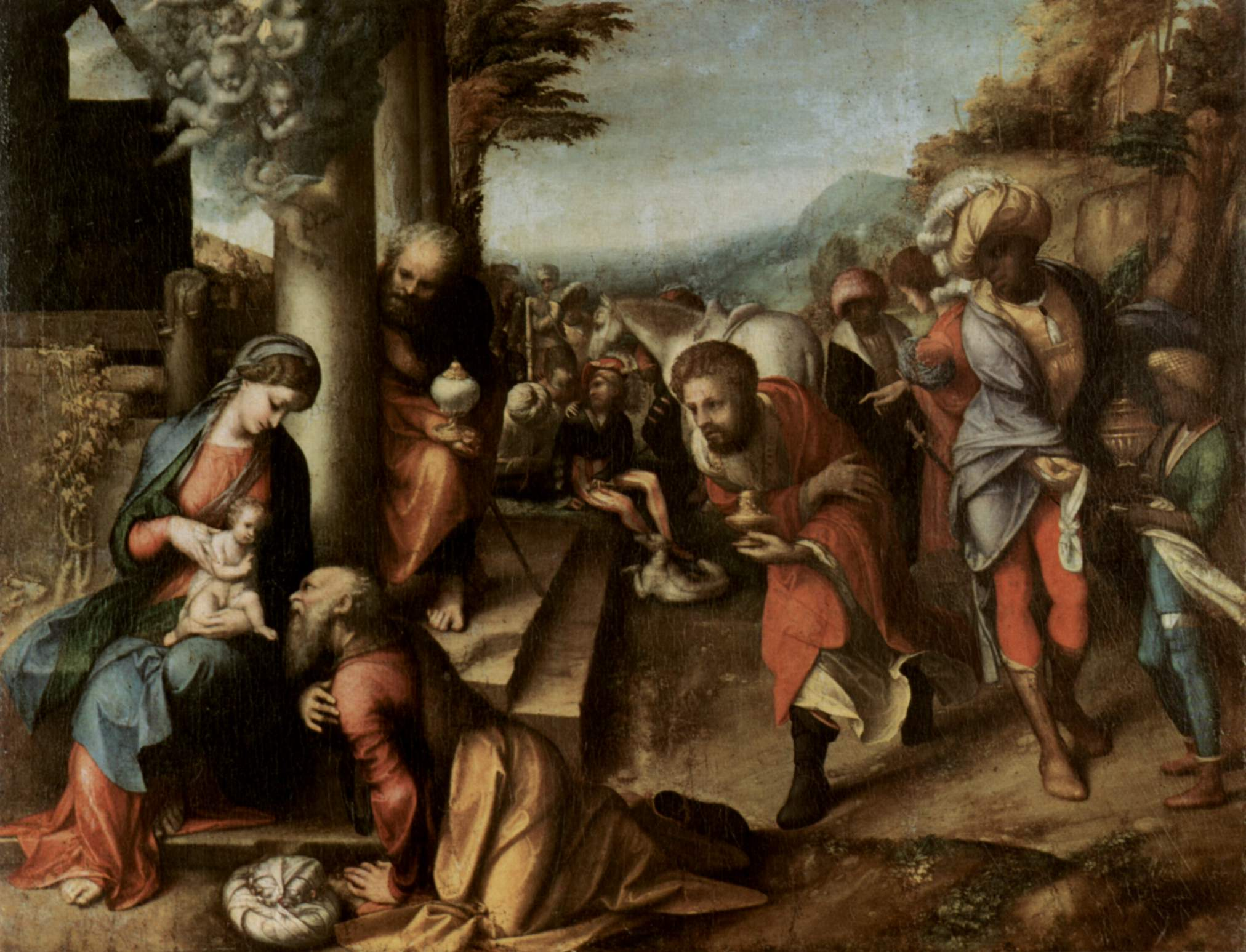
Adoration of the Magi by Correggio, c. 1518

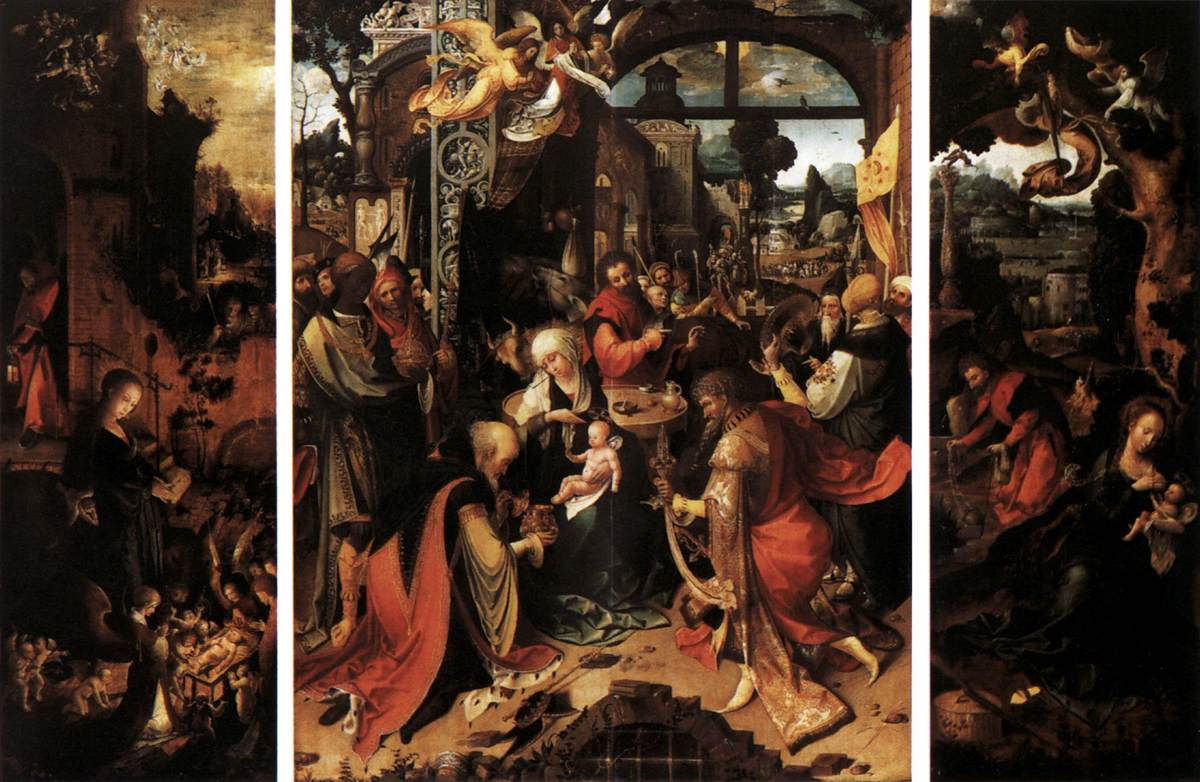
Brera Triptych by Jan de Beer, c. 1515

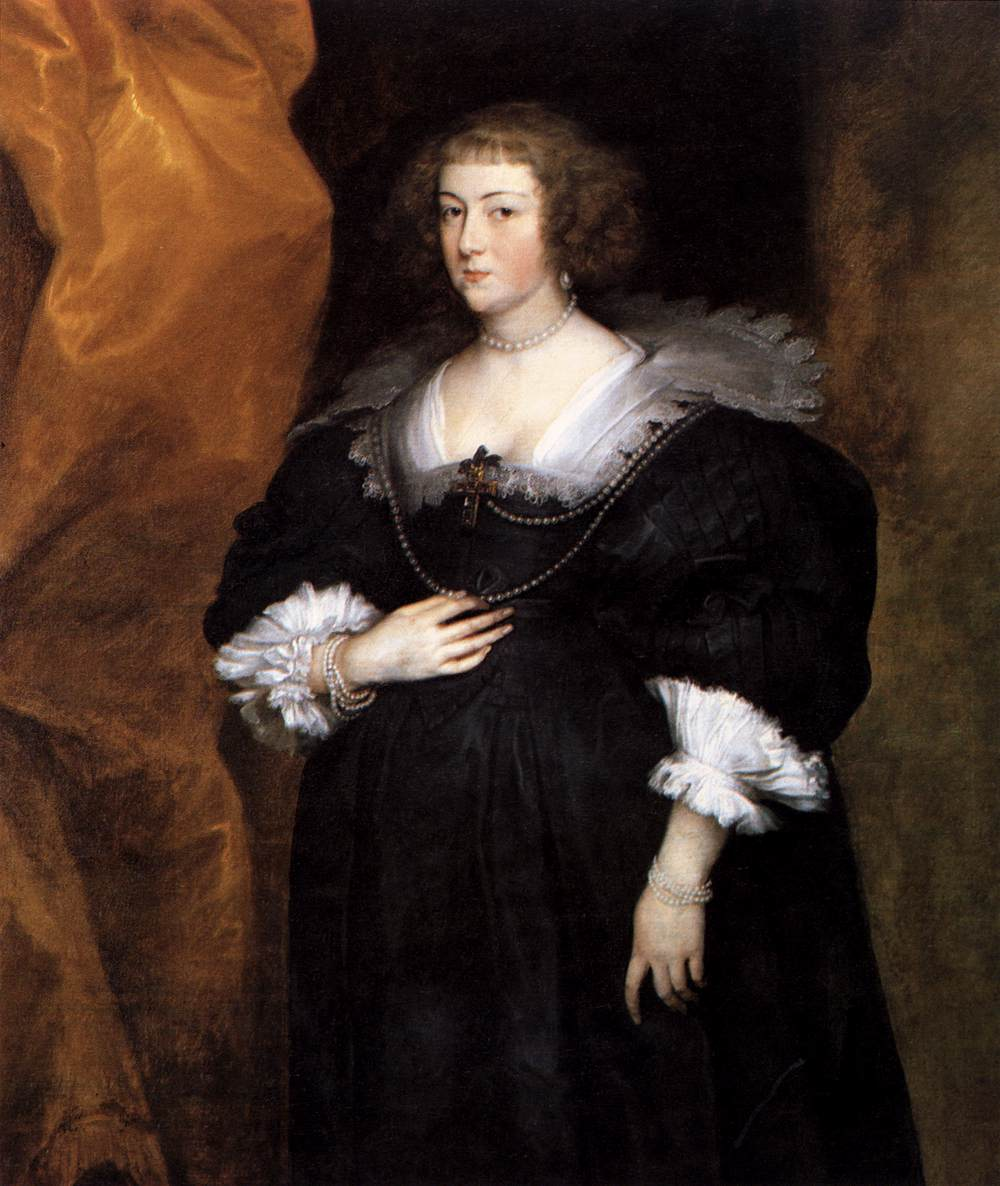
Portrait of a Lady by Anthony van Dyck, c. 1634 – c. 1635

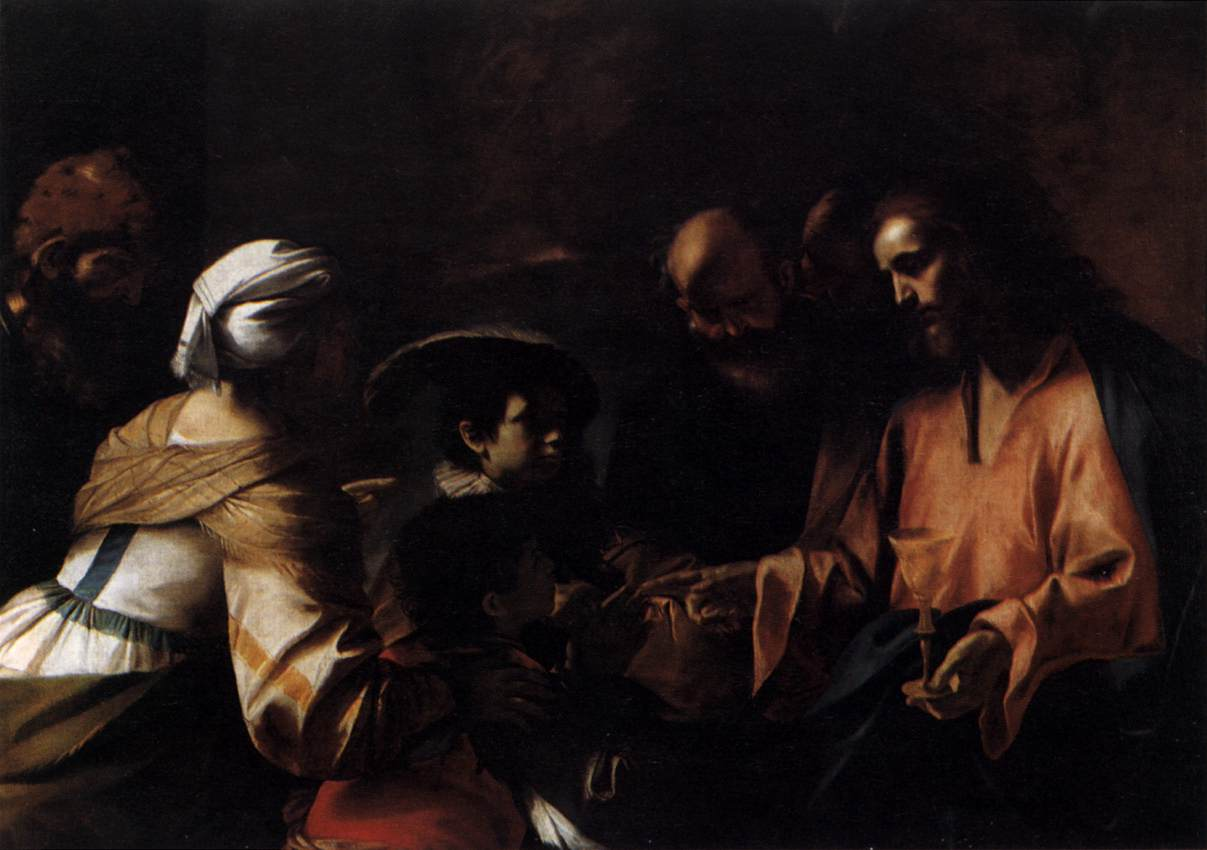
A Mother Entrusting Her Sons to Christ by Mattia Preti, c. 1635 – c. 1636

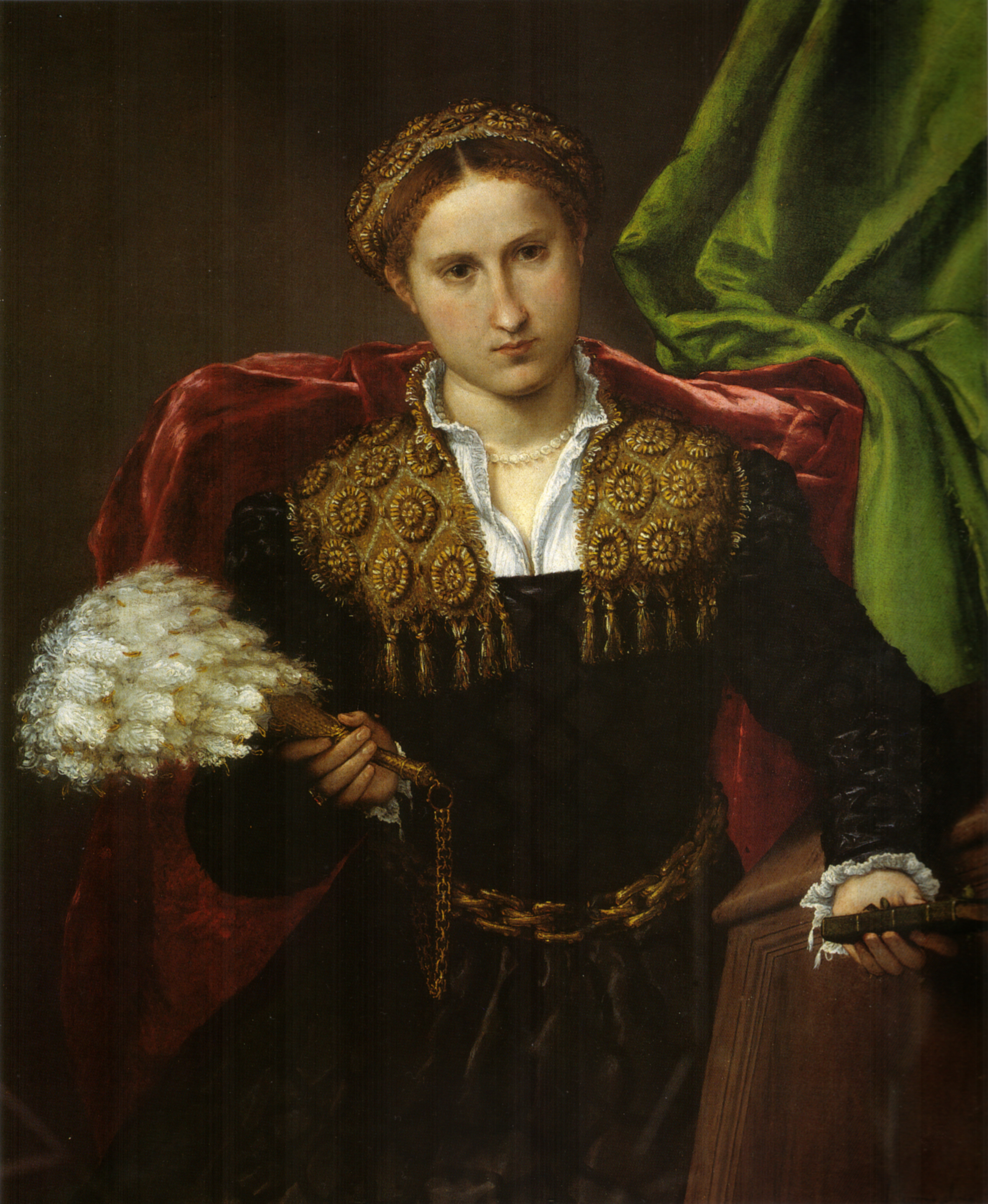
Portrait of Laura da Pola by Lorenzo Lotto, c. 1543

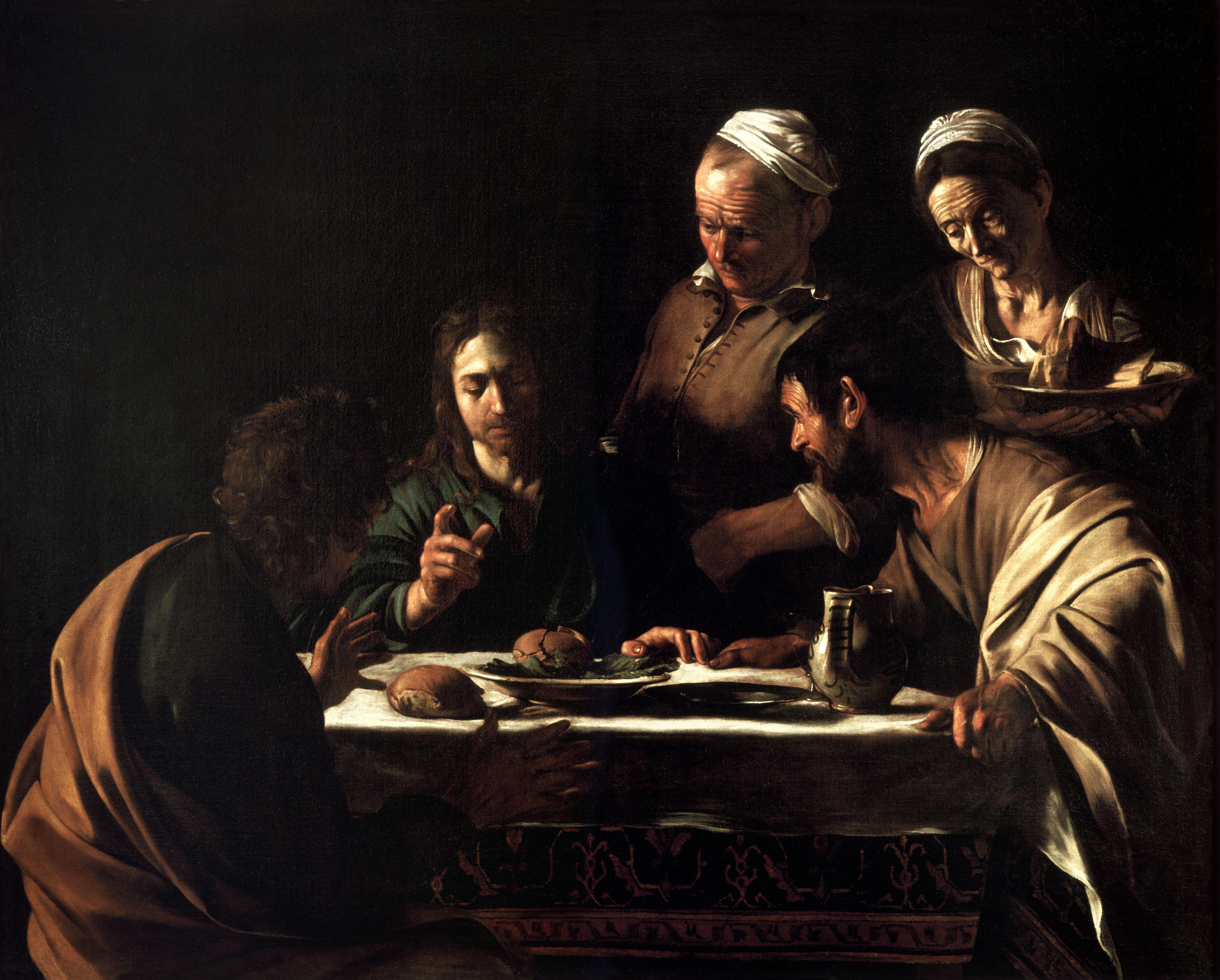
Supper at Emmaus by Caravaggio, 1606

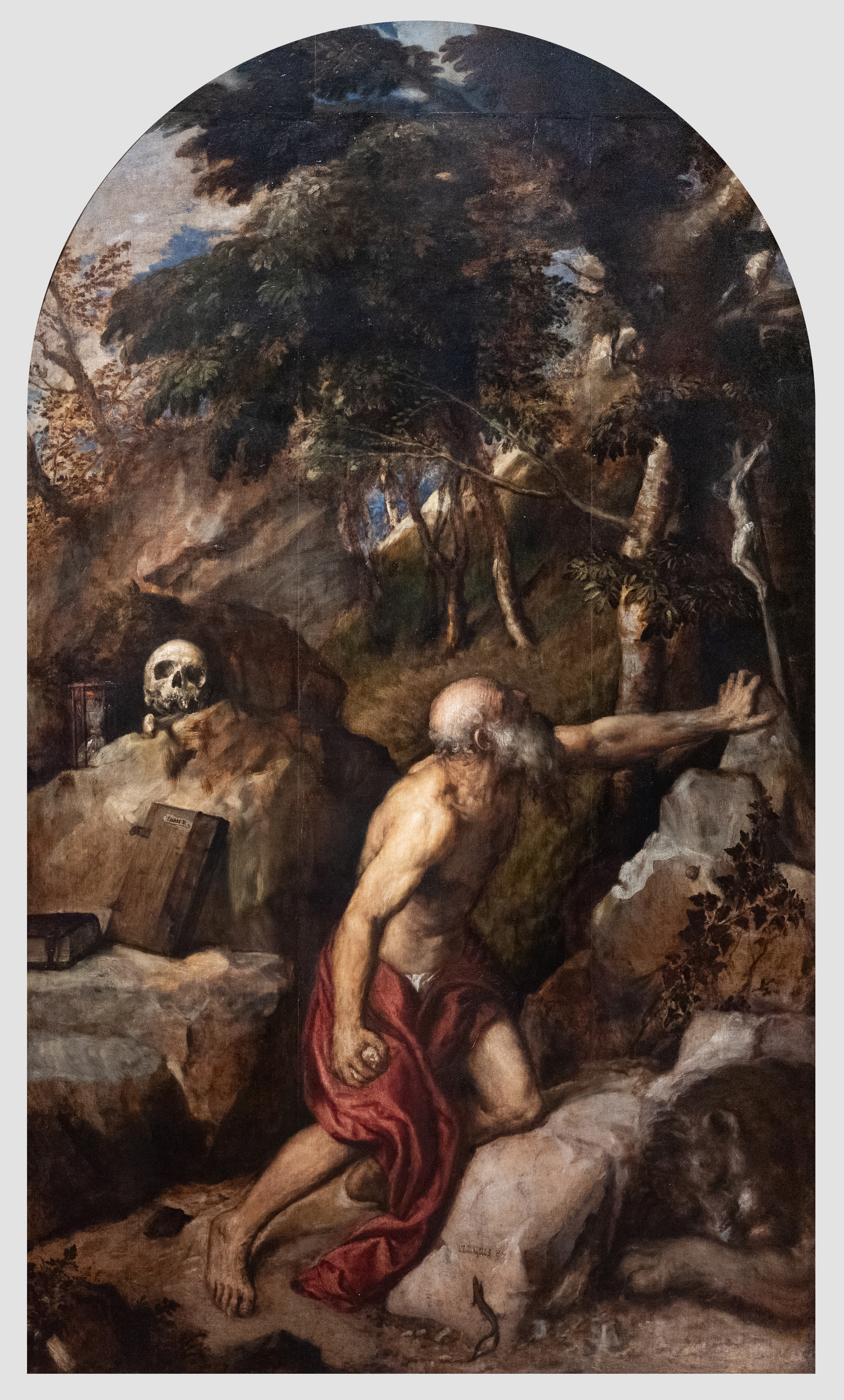
St. Jerome in Wilderness by Titian, c. 1560

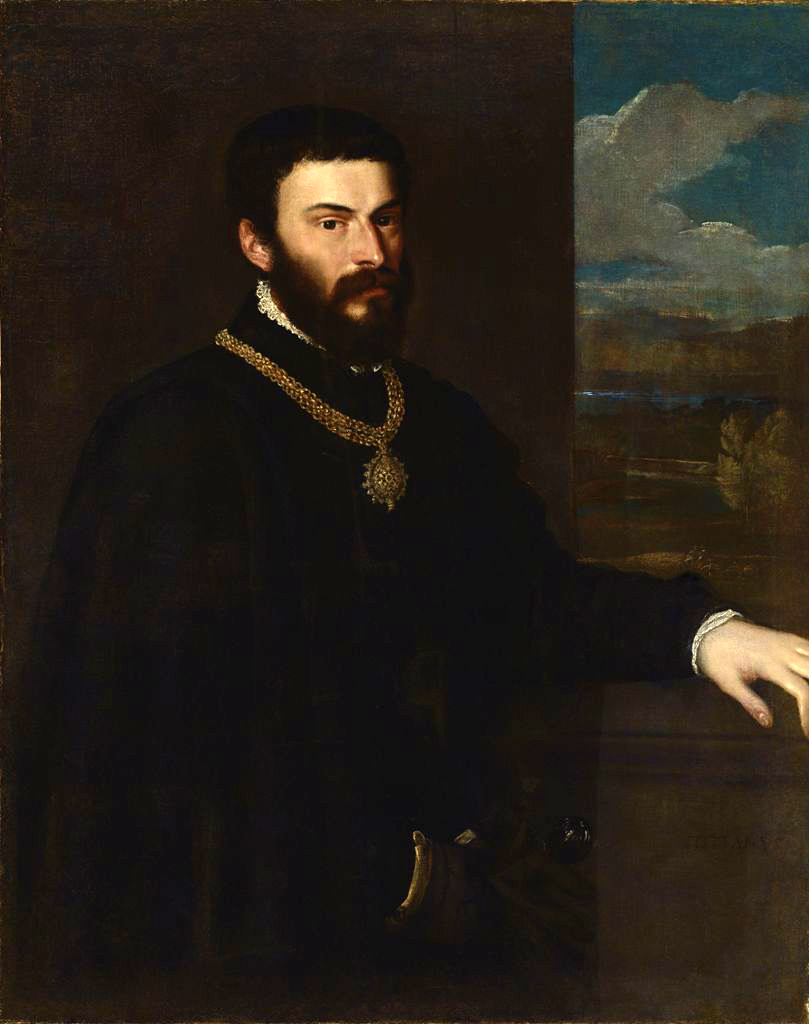
Portrait of Count Antonio Porcia by Titian, c. 1548

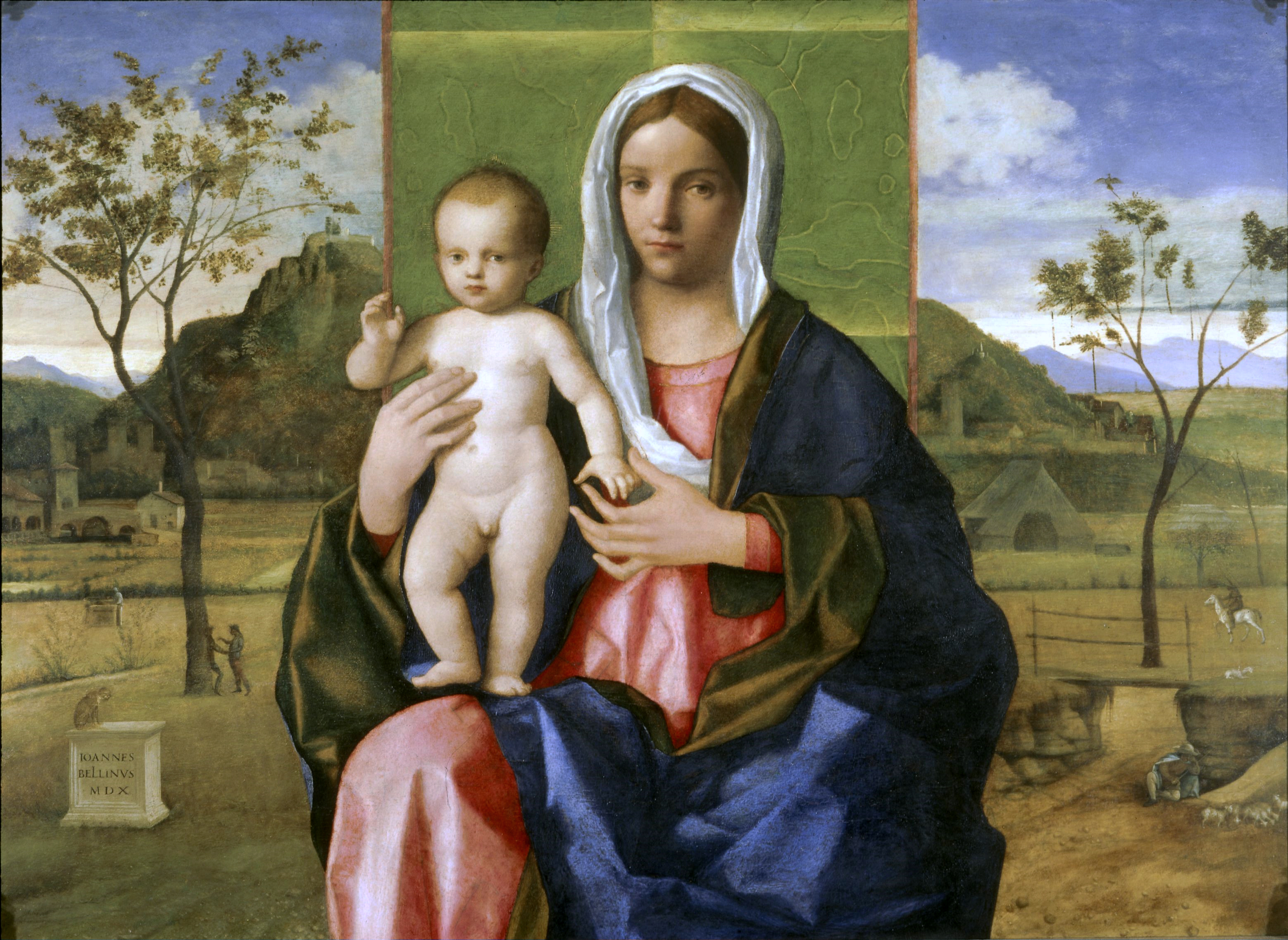
Madonna and Child Blessing by Giovanni Bellini, c. 1510

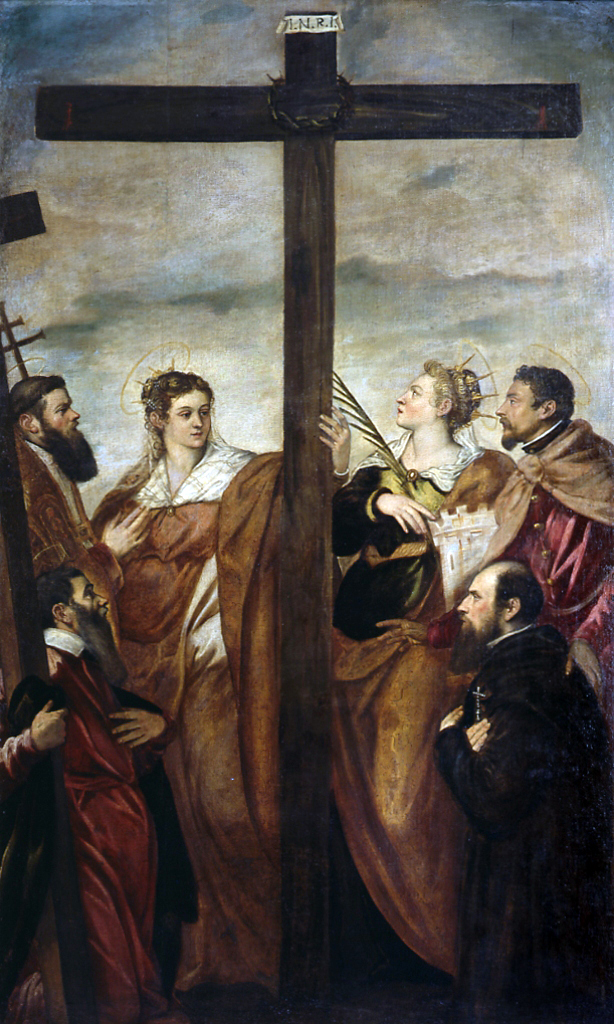
St. Helen and Barbara at the Cross by Tintoretto

== See also ==
- Collection of the Pinacoteca di Brera
- Aldo Carpi
- Nativity with St Elizabeth and the Infant John the Baptist
- Madonna and Child with an Angel
- Portrait of Teresa Manzoni Stampa Borri
