= Jan de Beer (painter) =

Flemish draughtsman and painter (1475–1528)

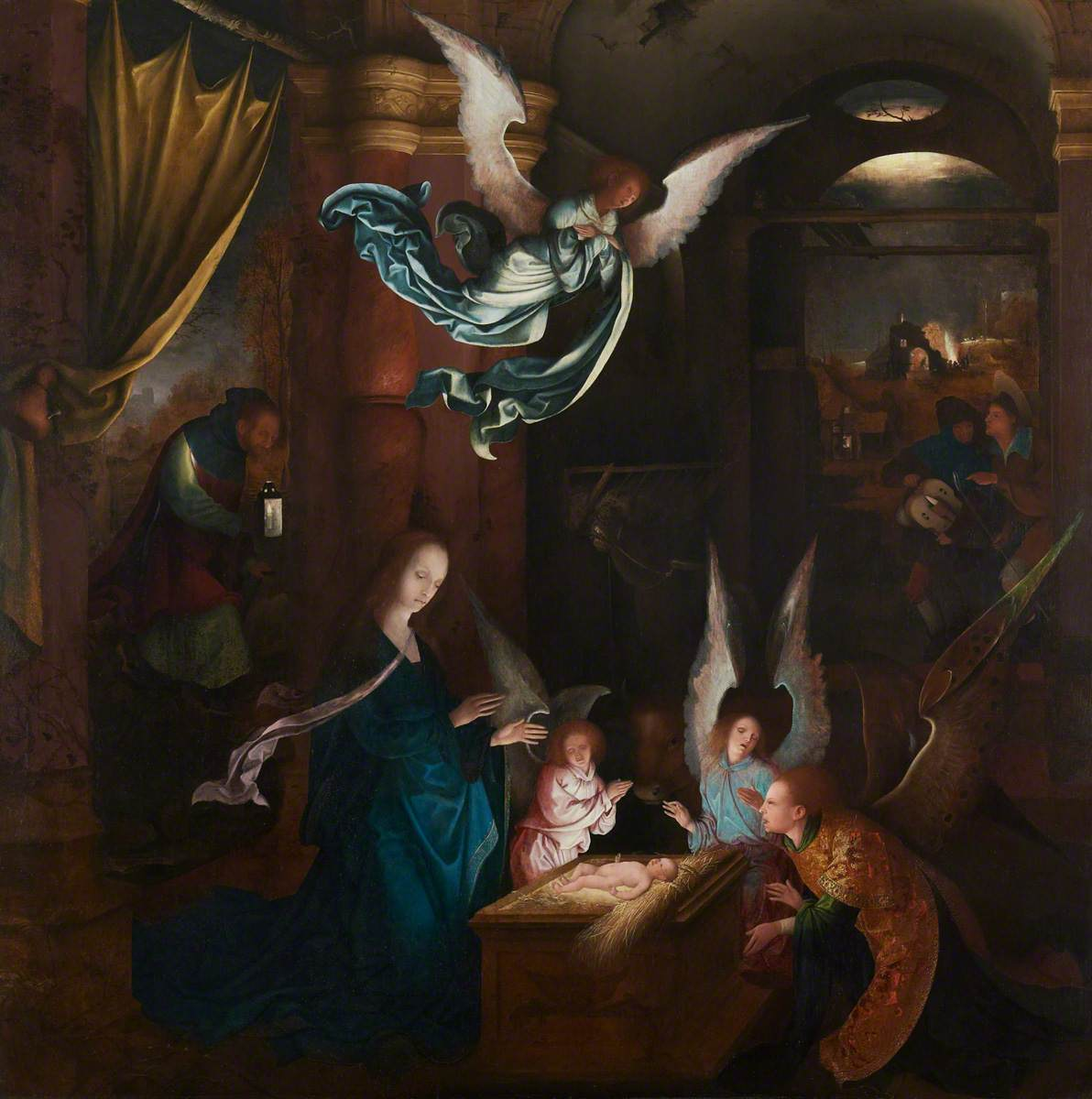
The Nativity (attributed), showing de Beer's typical dramatic lighting.

Jan de Beer, formerly known as the Master of the Milan Adoration (c. 1475 – 1528) was a Flemish painter, draughtsman and glass designer active in Antwerp at the beginning of the 16th century. He is considered one of the most important members of the loose group of painters active in and around Antwerp in the early 16th century referred to as the Antwerp Mannerists. Highly respected in his time, he operated a large workshop with an important output of religious compositions.

== Life ==
Jan de Beer was born around 1475 as the son of the painter Claes de Beer. His place of birth was in or near Antwerp. Claes de Beer and his family are known to have had possessions in Ekeren near Antwerp. Jan de Beer completed his apprenticeship with Gillis van Everen, a painter with a large workshop in Antwerp. Then he probably worked several years as the assistant of van Everen.

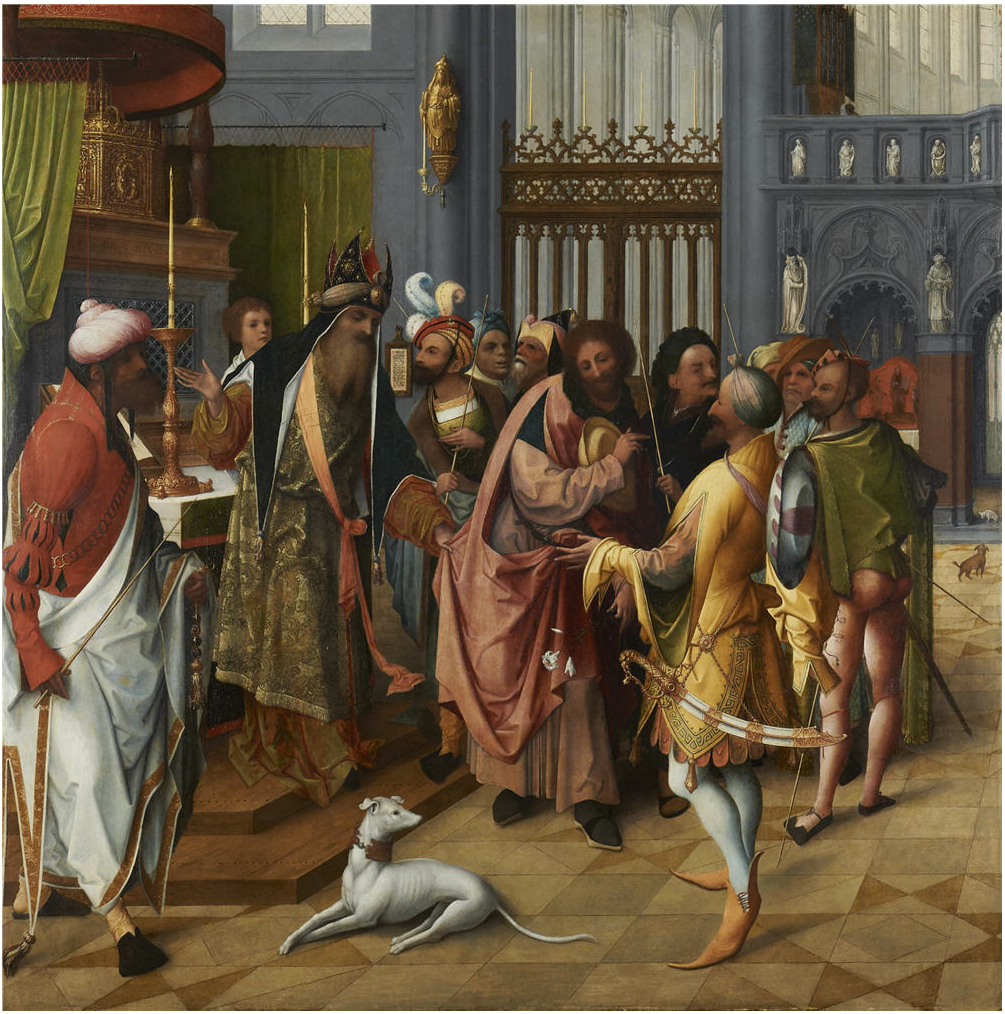
Joseph and the Suitors

Jan de Beer became a master of the Antwerp Guild of St Luke in 1504. He was an alderman of the Guild in 1509 and in 1515 he was elected its dean, a position he held until at least 1519. He came into conflict with the Guild at some point and even filed a lawsuit in 1519 regarding Guild administration.

Jan de Beer was linked with other prominent painters of the Antwerp School such as Quentin Matsys. Jan de Beer and Matsys were invited to judge in a dispute over the quality of a painted and carved altarpiece commissioned for the town of Dunkirk in 1509. De Beer and Metsys were both fellow aldermen of the Antwerp Guild of Saint Luke. Another artist with whom he was linked was the leading landscape painter Joachim Patinir and the two artists may have collaborated on commissions.

In 1508, Jan de Beer married the brewer's daughter Katline Weygers. The couple settled on Kipdorp in Antwerp and at around 1509, had a son called Aert or Arnould. Aert was, like his father, a painter and glass designer but died at a young age in 1540.

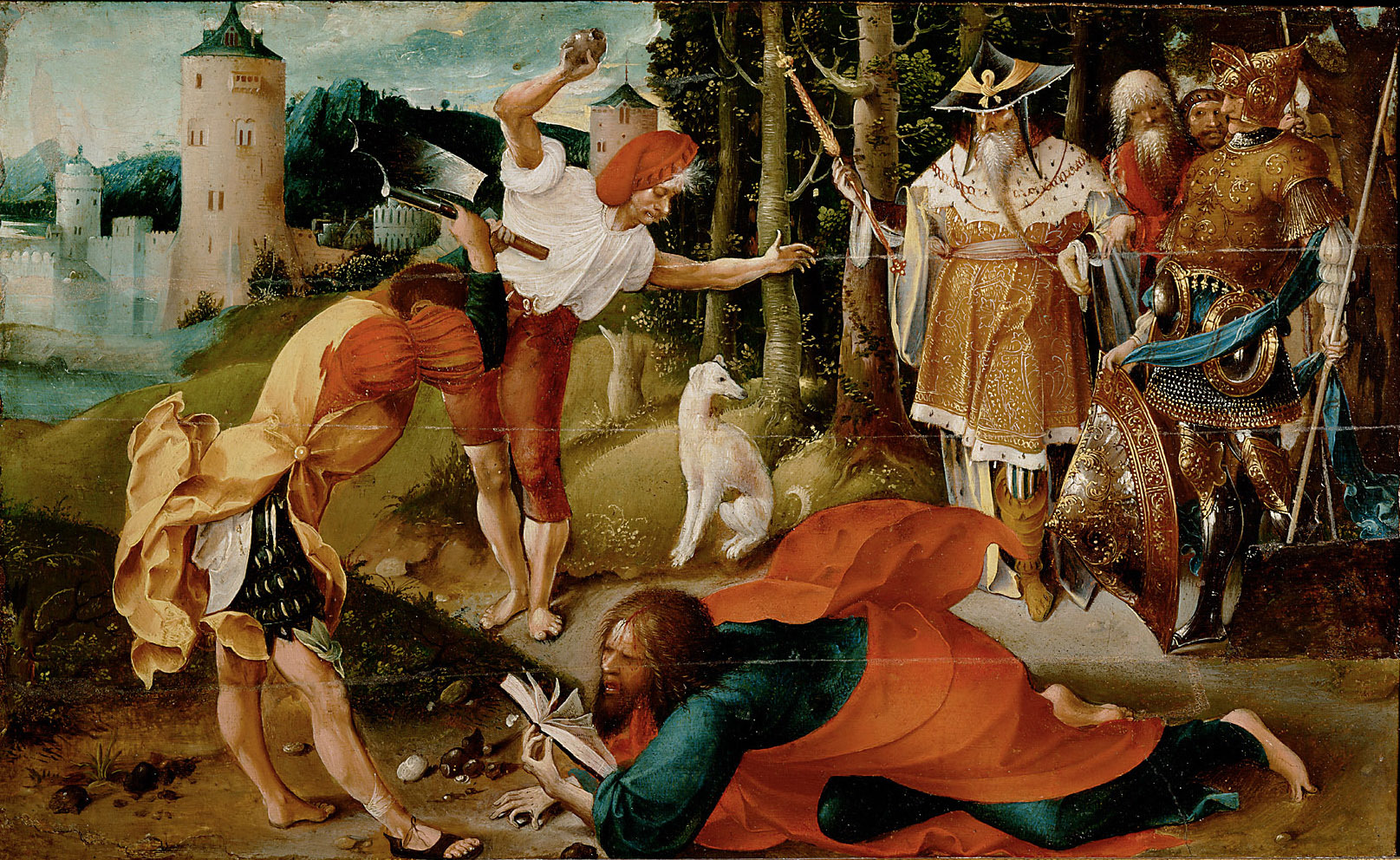
Martyrdom of the apostle St.Matthew

Jan de Beer operated a large workshop and from 1510 he took on pupils to assist him. He contributed to the temporary decorations for the Joyous Entry of Archduke Charles V, the later Holy Roman Emperor. He also worked on the decoration of the float that represented the Antwerp Chamber of rhetoric De Violieren in the parade during the 'landjuweel' (land jewel, a competition between various Chambers of rhetoric) in Mechelen.

From 1519 to 1528, Jan de Beer's name no longer appears in the archives. A document dated 10 November 1528 refers to the painter as deceased. He likely died in his home town of Antwerp.

== Work ==
=== Scope and style ===
Jan de Beer's oeuvre is made up of around 20 paintings and 12 drawings. Only two works with a signature are known: a painting with a partial signature and a study sheet with heads (British Museum), subsequently signed by de Beer and dated 1520. His paintings include single panels, triptychs and panels from altarpieces.

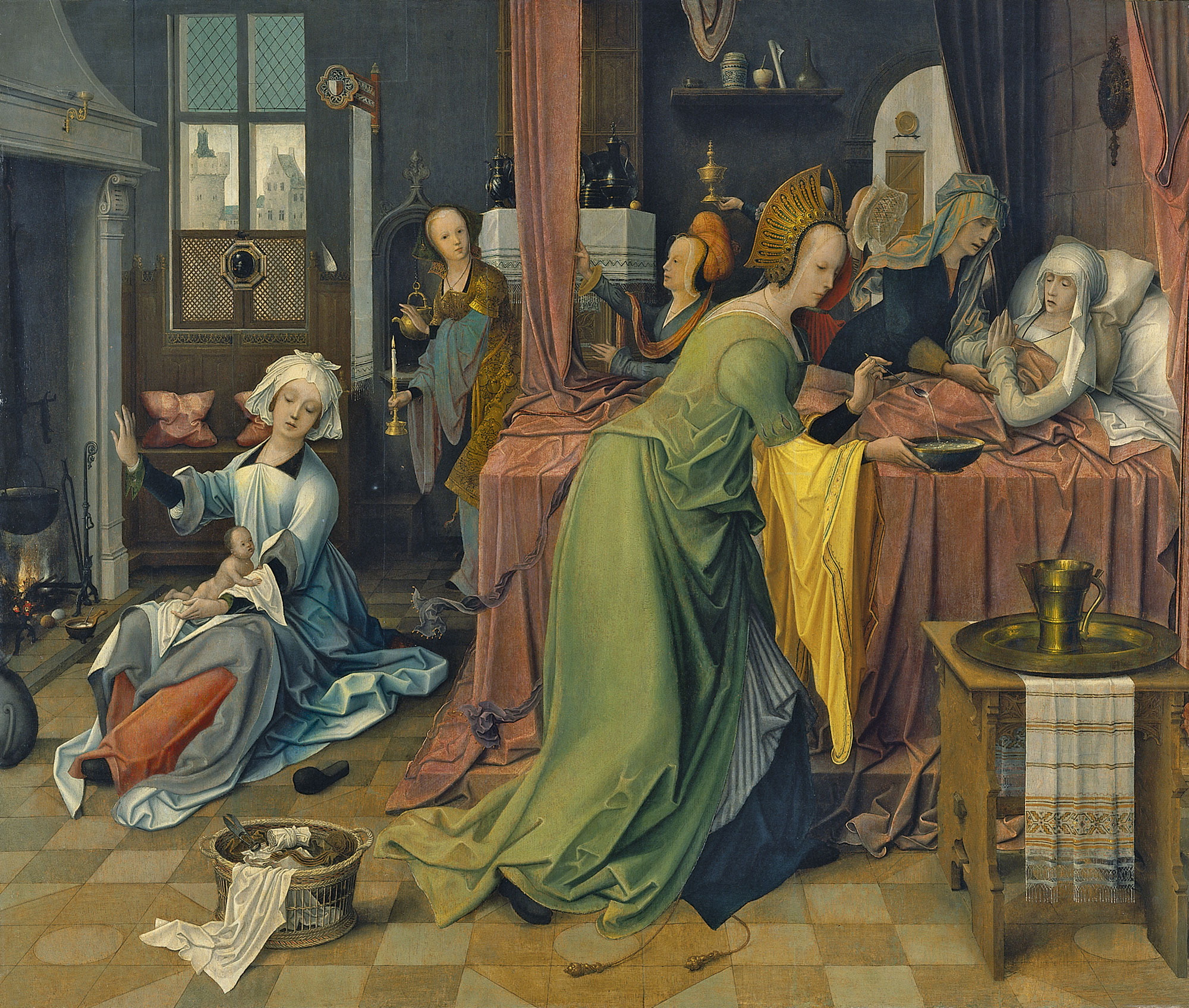
Birth of the Virgin

Jan de Beer was an exponent of Antwerp Mannerism and the only one of that movement who still enjoyed fame after his death. The Italian biographer Lodovico Guicciardini included de Beer in his list of famous Netherlandish artists of 1567. Despite his contemporary reputation, the artist's name fell into complete obscurity at the end of the 16th century and was only rediscovered at the beginning of the 20th century. Art historians Georges Hulin de Loo and Max Friedländer played a key role in the rediscovery of the artist. In 1902 Hulin de Loo discovered the artist's signature on a sketch of Nine Male Heads (British Museum), which he published in 1913. Two years later Friedländer, in his study of Antwerp Mannerism, grouped various works under the notname Master of the Milan Adoration, a name chosen with reference to the central work in the oeuvre, the Adoration of the Magi in the Pinacoteca di Brera (Milan). In 1933 Friedländer identified that Master with de Beer. Friedländer considered de Beer to be one of the key figures of Antwerp Mannerism.

The exact scope of the artist's oeuvre is still not fully established as art historians do not agree on which works should be attributed to the artist. The Brera Adoration of the Magi and the signed sketch of Nine Male Heads (British Museum) are the basis on which all attributions are based. There is also no agreement on the level of involvement of his workshop in each of the works linked to the artist. Because of the uneven level of the works attributed to the artist, various theories have been proposed on the role of his workshop assistants in particular works.

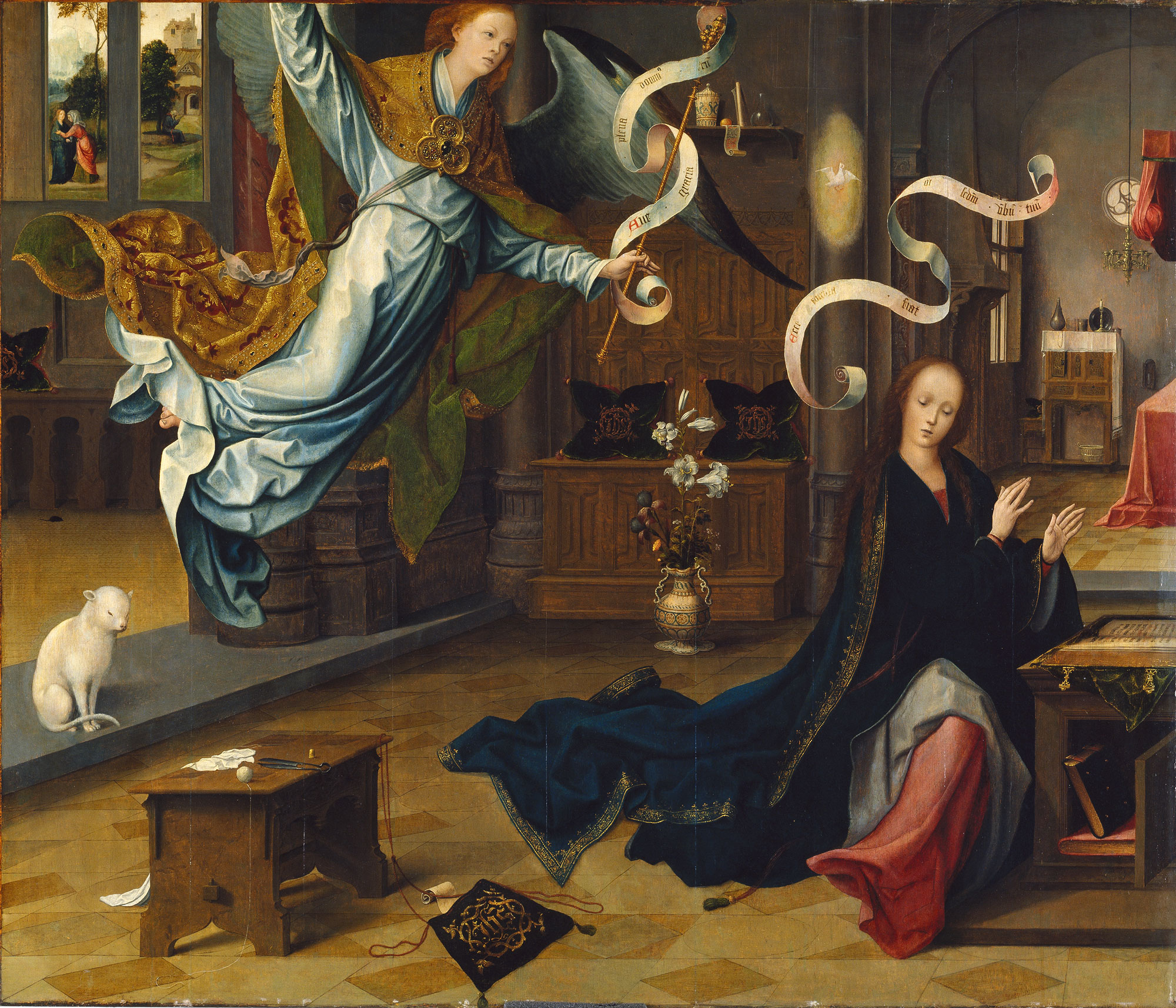
Annunciation

Jan de Beer was an artist who is counted amongst the group of painters referred to as the Antwerp Mannerists. The term given to these artists is misleading as they and their work are unrelated to the Italian Mannerism of the 16th century. It refers to a group of mainly anonymous painters active in the Southern Netherlands and principally in Antwerp in the first two decades of the 16th century. They operated large workshops with a substantial output much of which was exported. Their art showed a preference for elegant artificiality. The Antwerp Mannerists typically depicted religious themes, which they interpreted generally in a more superficial manner than the Flemish artists of the previous century in favour of a fluid form and an abundance of meticulously rendered details. They also show a preference for a changing palette. Their compositions are typically shock-full with agitated figures in exotic, extravagant clothes. The compositions typically include architectural ruins. The architecture is initially Gothic but later Renaissance motifs become dominant. Many of the panels or triptychs produced by the Antwerp Mannerists depicted scenes of the Nativity of Jesus, usually situated at night, the Adoration of the Magi and the Crucifixion. The Adoration of the Magi was in particular dear to them as it allowed the artists to give free rein to their preoccupation with ornament and the simulation and imitation of luxury products.

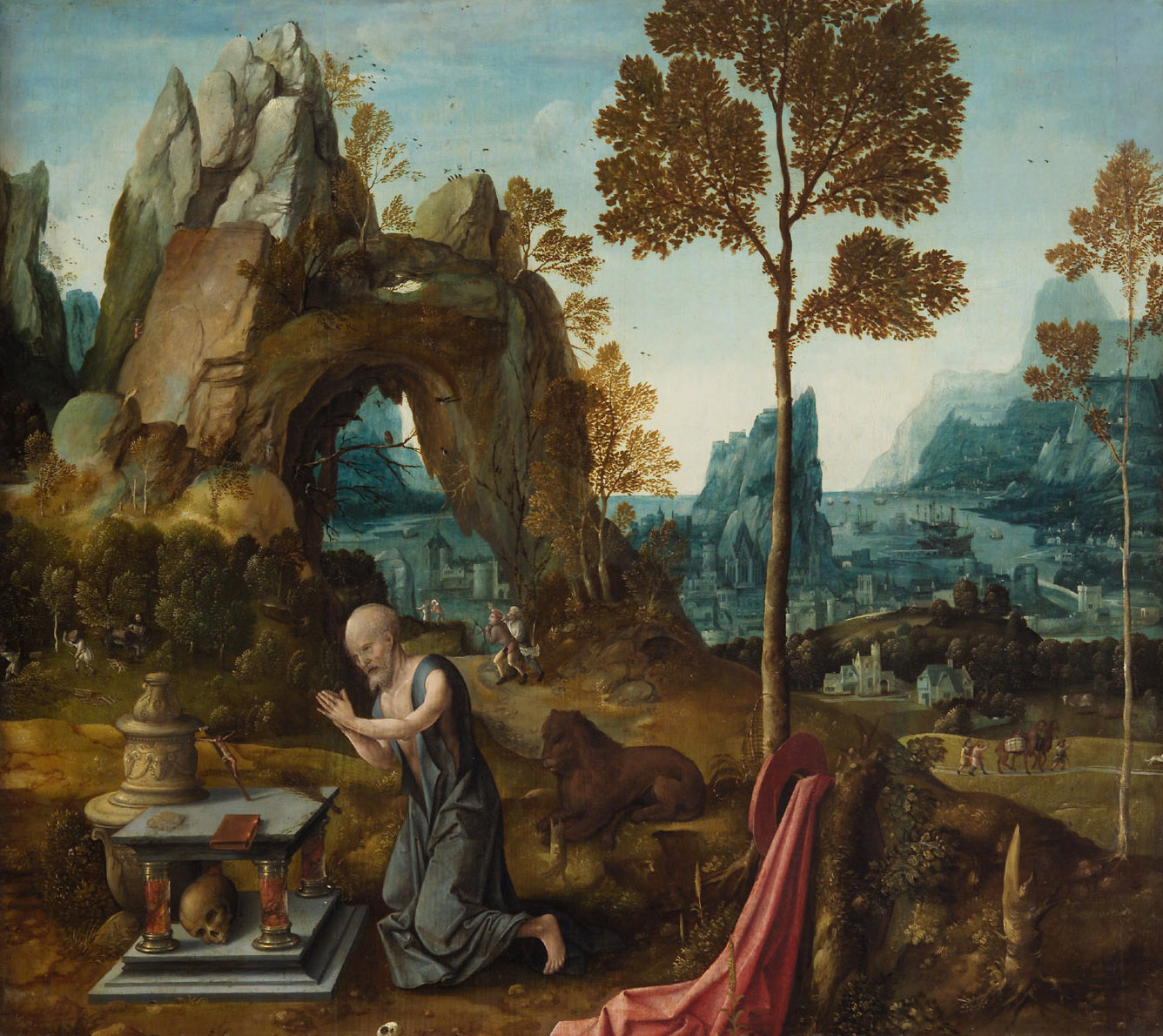
Penitent St. Jerome in a landscape

Jan de Beer's work shares the characteristics of the work of the other representatives of Antwerp Mannerism. Like them, Jan de Beer and his workshop painted religious works and altarpieces. A majority of the works deal with scenes related to the Nativity of Jesus by night and the Adoration of the Magi. While the Antwerp Mannerists often used standardised models in their works, Jan de Beer demonstrated that it was still possible to achieve a high level of individuality within these conventionalized forms. His work distinguishes itself through its refined colourism and emotional and psychological depth. Friedländer identified several characteristics of de Beer's style such as Gothic architecture, draped curtains, billowing figures and robes that spread out to the ground or end in points.

=== Adoration of the Magi ===
The Adoration of the Magi in the Pinacoteca is central to Jan de Beer's oeuvre. The work was completed in 1515 with the assistance of his thriving workshop. It has been suggested by an art historian that the two wing panels were entrusted by Jan de Beer to the so-called 'Master of Amiens', one of his best students. This theory is not universally accepted. The external sides of the wing panels depict the Annunciation in grisaille, the prologue of the scenes depicted inside. The work found its way to Venice where it may have been located in the convent of Santa Maria Maddalena delle Covertite alla Giudecca or the church of Santa Maria dei Servi. The triptych had previously been attributed to Albrecht Dürer, Lucas van Leyden and Herri met de Bles before it was returned to Jan de Beer by Friedländer.

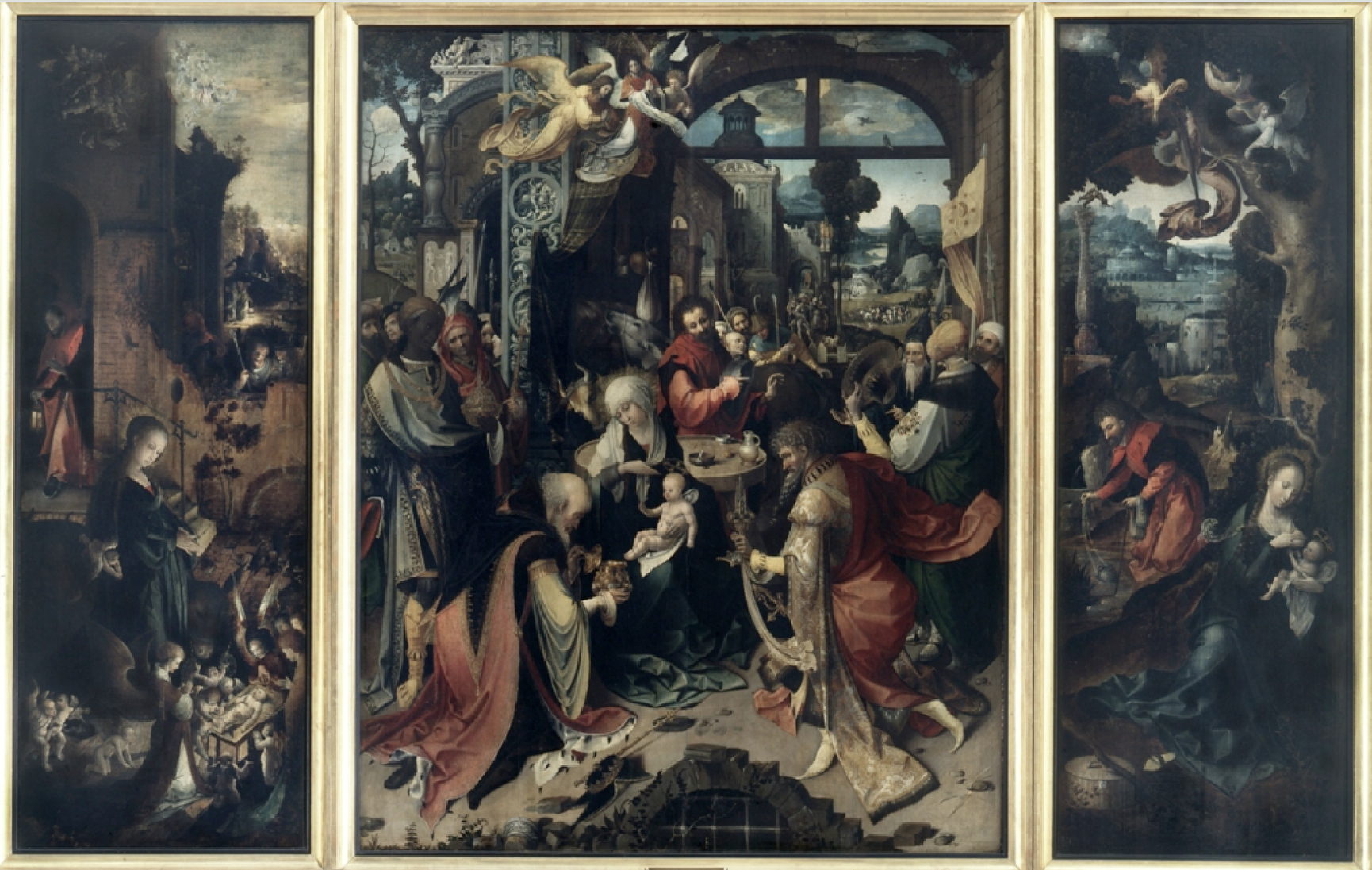
Adoration of the Magi Triptych

The triptych had an important influence on Venetian painting in the 1520s, particularly on the work of Lorenzo Lotto and Girolamo Savoldo. These Italian artists were especially fascinated by the effects of supernatural light that illuminated de Beer's nocturnal scenes.

The triptych was made according to the dictates of the 'modern devotion' movement, a religious movement calling for apostolic renewal through genuine pious practices such as humility, obedience and simplicity of life. The triptych's visual programme was intended to prompt the faithful, through the contemplation of major episodes in the life of the Holy Family, to follow the Christian lifestyle.

The triptych's three scenes are linked together only by a thematic point of view: the landscape, the light effects and the proportions of the figures are different in the three scenes. It is because of these differences within the compositional ensemble that the hypothesis was formed of a close collaboration of Jan de Beer with another master, referred to as the Master of Amiens, in the execution of the two side panels.

=== Drawings ===
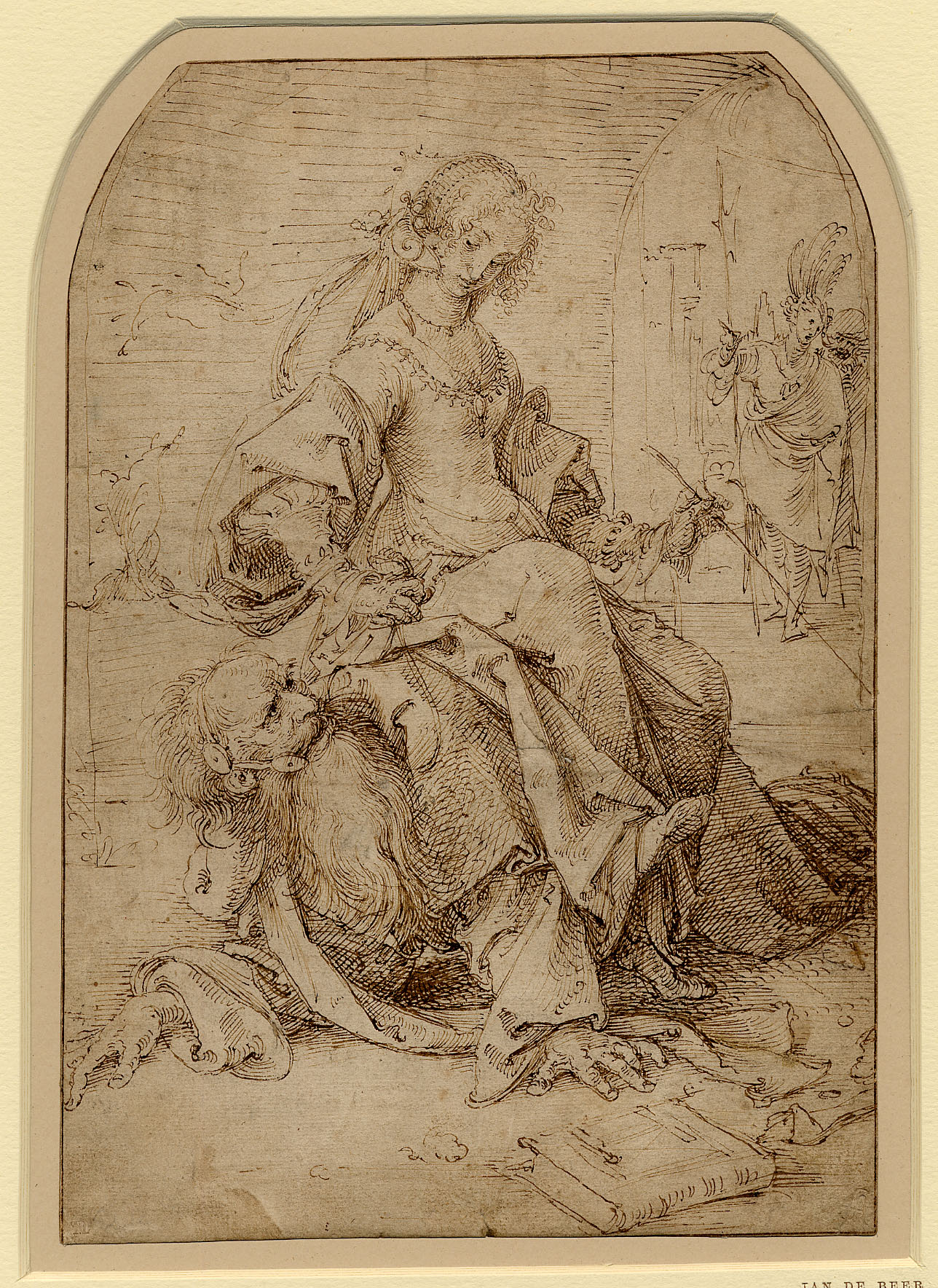
Aristotle and Phyllis

His drawings are principally preparatory studies for paintings, designs and cartoons for glass windows and works on canvas that served as a possible example for temporary decorations during festive occasions.
