= La novillada =

Painting by Francisco de Goya

- Young Bulls Race (English)
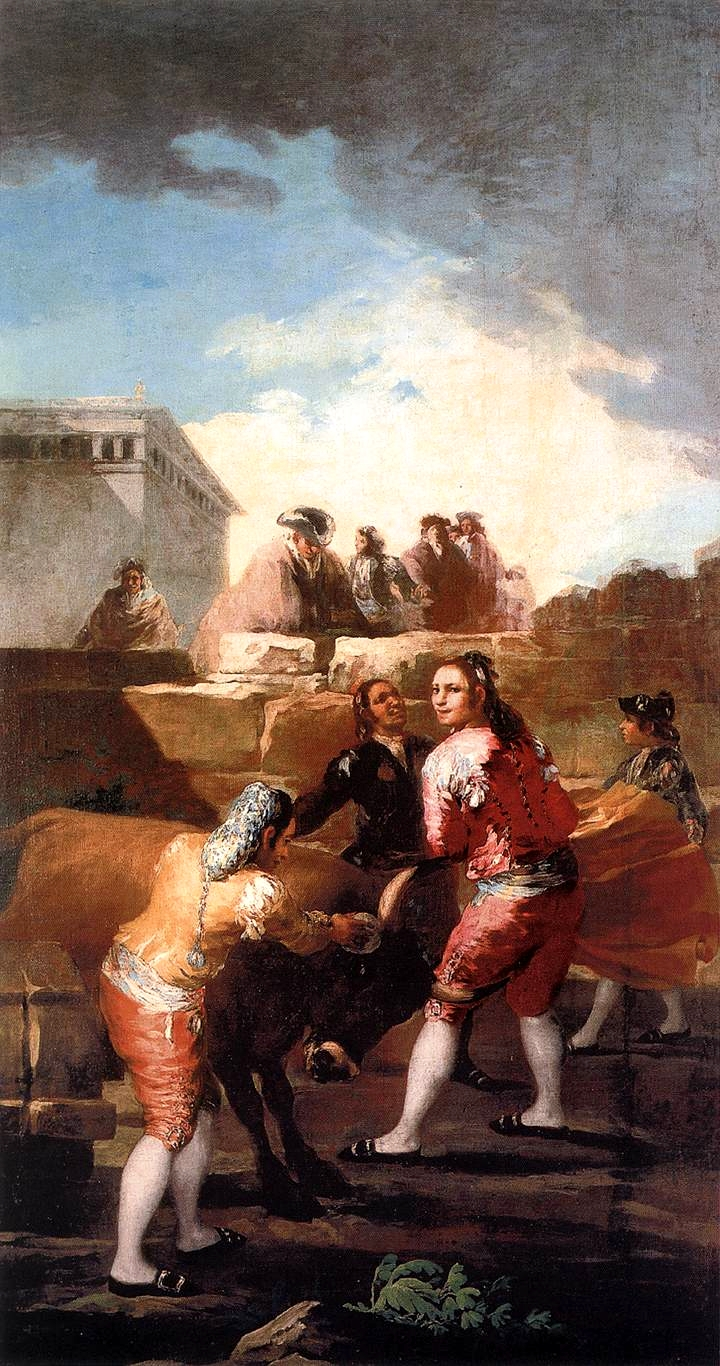
- Artist: Francisco de Goya
- Year: 1780
- Medium: Oil painting, tapestry cartoon
- Movement: Rococo
- Dimensions: 136 cm × 259 cm (54 in × 102 in)
- Location: Museo del Prado, Madrid

La novillada (English: Young Bulls Race), is an oil painting by Francisco de Goya, painted in 1780, when he was trying his hand at bullfighting. It is part of the fourth series of tapestry cartoons for the Prince of Asturias' antechamber in the Pardo Palace.

== Context ==
Goya was an aficionado, and frequented the world of bullfighting, considered at the time to be "the refuge of scoundrels where ruffians and adventurers are at ease". He describes La Novillada as a cape pass involving several young men, but does not name himself along them, even though he more or less portrayed himself. He subsequently painted several portraits of bullfighters, the best-known of which is that of Pedro Romero.

== History ==
All the paintings in the fourth series were destined for the antechamber of the Prince of Asturias, the future Charles IV and his wife Marie Louise de Parme, in the Pardo palace. The painting was delivered to the Royal Tapestry Factory on January 24, 1780 and received by its director, Cornelio Vandergoten. A document dated October 2, 1777, whose provenance is unknown, states that the La Novillada tapestry was to hang on the south wall of the princes' antechamber next to another tapestry: El Resguardo de tabacos.

It was considered lost until 1869, when the canvas was discovered in the basement of the Royal Palace in Madrid by Gregorio Cruzada Villaamil, and was returned to the Prado Museum in 1870 by the ordinances of January 19 and February 9, 1870, where it is exhibited in room 91. The painting was first mentioned in the Museo del Prado catalog in 1876.

The series was composed of El Ciego de la guitarra, El Columpio, Las Lavanderas, La Novillada, El Resguardo de tabacos, El Muchacho del pájaro et El Niño del árbol, Los Leñadores, El Majo de la guitarra, La Cita, El Médico, El Balancín and two lost pieces: El Perro and La Fuente.

== Description ==
The painting depicts a festival similar to Francisco Bayeu's Taureaux de Carabanchel. Historian José Camón Aznar sees a connection with Goya's childhood memories (when he tried his hand at bullfighting). It is said that the bright colors drove the weavers at the Royal Factory mad, as they were commissioned to create tapestries based on Goya's sketch.

The ensemble features a group of young people in colorful costumes, and in the main figure, who turns his head towards the viewers, a portrait of the artist himself has been seen. This is also what Claude Pelletier says: "A witness to his time, Goya was probably an amateur bullfighter in his youth. Here, he has portrayed himself in a red costume, as the main character in this humble novillada.

The bright colors are characteristic of Goya's "first period", as is the abundance of Majos who were, depending on the occasion, either commoners or noblemen dressed as such. Édouard Manet described them in one of his best-known paintings, Jeune Homme en costume de majo. The majos and majas were known for their sartorial pursuits inspired by popular customs.

However, Cornelio Vandergoten, the director of the production, gives a different version of Goya's interpretation of the scene. According to him, the figures here are in a sorto position.

The Swing and La Novillada could represent a passage written by Nicolás Fernández de Moratín, Leandro's father, in the clandestine poem Arte de las putas:

"Flee the right-handed one so accursed custom

always give the hurgonazo in passing

to Cándido inciting, the great bullfighter

which, by the prompt, is clean his thrust "

- Nicolás Fernández de Moratín, Arte de las putas (II, 135-138)

"Run away from this good habit so cursed

always give a blow of the saddle in passing

inciting Candide, the great bullfighter

whose stockade is suddenly clean"

However, according to Jeannine Baticle, Goya didn't start frequenting the capital's Lumières until 1779, and it's likely that he only gained access to this poem - written in the early 1770s - through them, and therefore after the production of this carton.

== Goya's La Tauromaquia ==
In addition to La Tauromaquia, Goya was greatly inspired by popular bullfighting games. There are several replicas of his Children Playing Bulls, including one in Madrid's Museo Lázaro Galdiano; The Picador, an oil on canvas (56 × 47 cm) in the Prado Museum, is thought to be a study for a larger painting for the Almeda de Osuna entitled Choice of Bulls.

After his illness, which left him deaf, Goya devoted himself almost exclusively to bullfighting during a stay in Andalusia in 1790. The result was a series of twelve small metal paintings entitled Scènes de divertissements nationaux, which he presented as a means of “occupying his mortified imagination”. We usually refer to eight of these small paintings, which form a coherent whole twenty years before the Tauromachie gravée, as the Série Torrecilla, named after the marquis to whom this collection had belonged.

There are countless works on the subject of bullfighting, and they are not always easy to locate. Many are in private collections, such as La Pose des banderilles (1793–1794, oil on tin, 43 × 31 cm).

== See also ==
- La Tauromaquia
- Francisco Goya's tapestry cartoons
- List of works by Francisco Goya

== Bibliography ==
- Martinez-Novillo, Alvaro (1988). Le Peintre et la Tauromachie. Paris: Flammarion.
- Camón Aznar, José (1980). Francisco de Goya. Zaragoza.
- María de Cossío, José (1980). Los toros: Tratado tecnico e historico. Espasa-Calpe. ISBN 84-239-6008-0.
- Pelletier, Claude (1992). L'heure de la corrida coll. " Découvertes Gallimard / Culture et société ". Paris: Gallimard. ISBN 2-07-053189-9.
- Luna, Juan J. (1996). Goya, 250 aniversario. Madrid: Musée du Prado. ISBN 84-87317-48-0.
- Cruzada Villaamil, Gregorio (1870). Los tapices de Goya. Rivadeneyra. OCLC 27205287.
- Arnaiz, José Manuel (1987). Francisco de Goya: cartones y tapices. Madrid: Espasa Calpe.
- de Sambricio, V. (1946). Tapices de Goya. Madrid: Patrimonio Nacional.
- Tomlinson, Janis (1993). Francisco de Goya: los cartones para tapices y los comienzos de su carrera en la corte de Madrid. Madrid: Cátedra. ISBN 978-84-376-0392-6.
- Laurent, Jean (1899). Catalogue illustré des tableaux du Musée du Prado à Madrid. J. Laurent et Cie.
