= List of works by Pieter Coecke van Aelst =

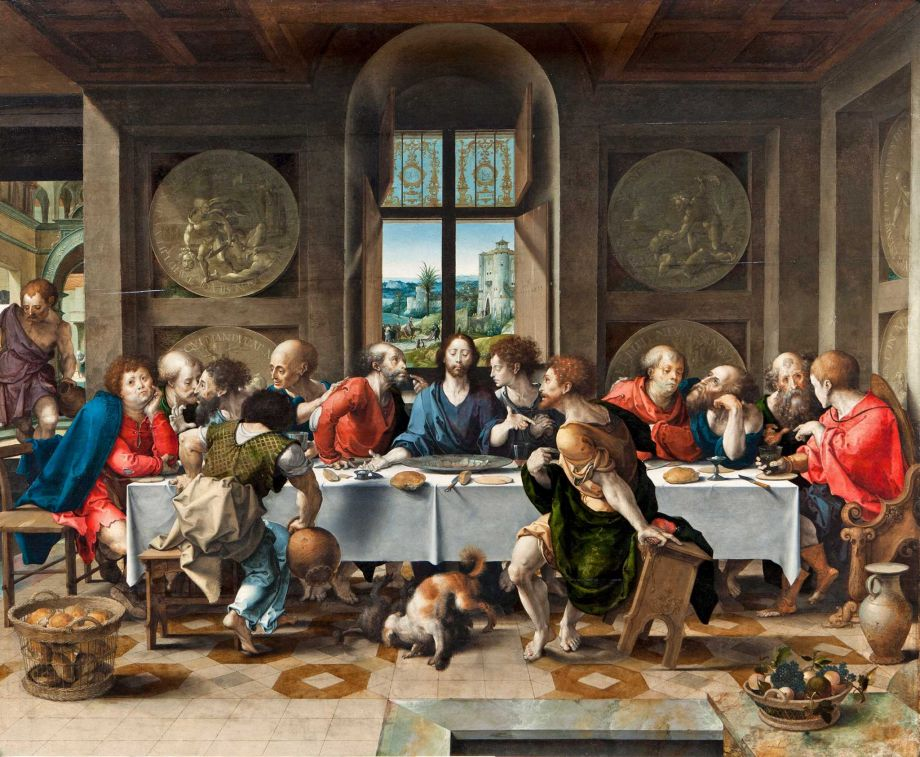
The Last Supper

Pieter Coecke van Aelst (Aalst, 14 August 1502 – Brussels, 6 December 1550) was a Flemish painter, sculptor, architect, author and designer of woodcuts, goldsmith's work, stained glass and tapestries. His principal subjects were Christian religious themes.

Below is an incomplete list of Pieter Coecke van Aelst's works:

- Christ and His Disciples on Their Way to Emmaus, Oil on panel, 68 x 87 cm, Private collection
- Descent from the Cross, c. 1535, Oil on panel, 119 x 170 cm, Amstelkring Museum, Amsterdam
- The Adoration of the Magi, Oil on panel, Museo del Prado, Madrid
- The Adoration of the Magi, Oil on panel, Rijksmuseum Amsterdam,
- Crucifixion, tapestry, Pinacoteca Comunale, Forlì
- Triptych, 1530s, Oil on panel, 105 x 68 cm (central), 105 x 28 cm (each wing), Private collection
- Triptych: Adoration of the Magi, Oil on panel, 89 x 57 cm (central), 89 x 25 cm (each wing), Private collection
- Triptych: Descent from the Cross, 1540–1550, Oil on panel, 262 x 172 cm (central), 274 x 84 cm (each wing), Museu Nacional de Arte Antiga, Lisbon
- Triptych of Saint James the Lesser and Saint Philip, Museu de Arte Sacra do Funchal
- The last Holy Communion, Kroměříž Archbishop's Palace picture gallery, Kroměříž
