= The Card Players (Goya) =

1777–1778 painting by Francisco de Goya

- Jugadores de naipes (Spanish)
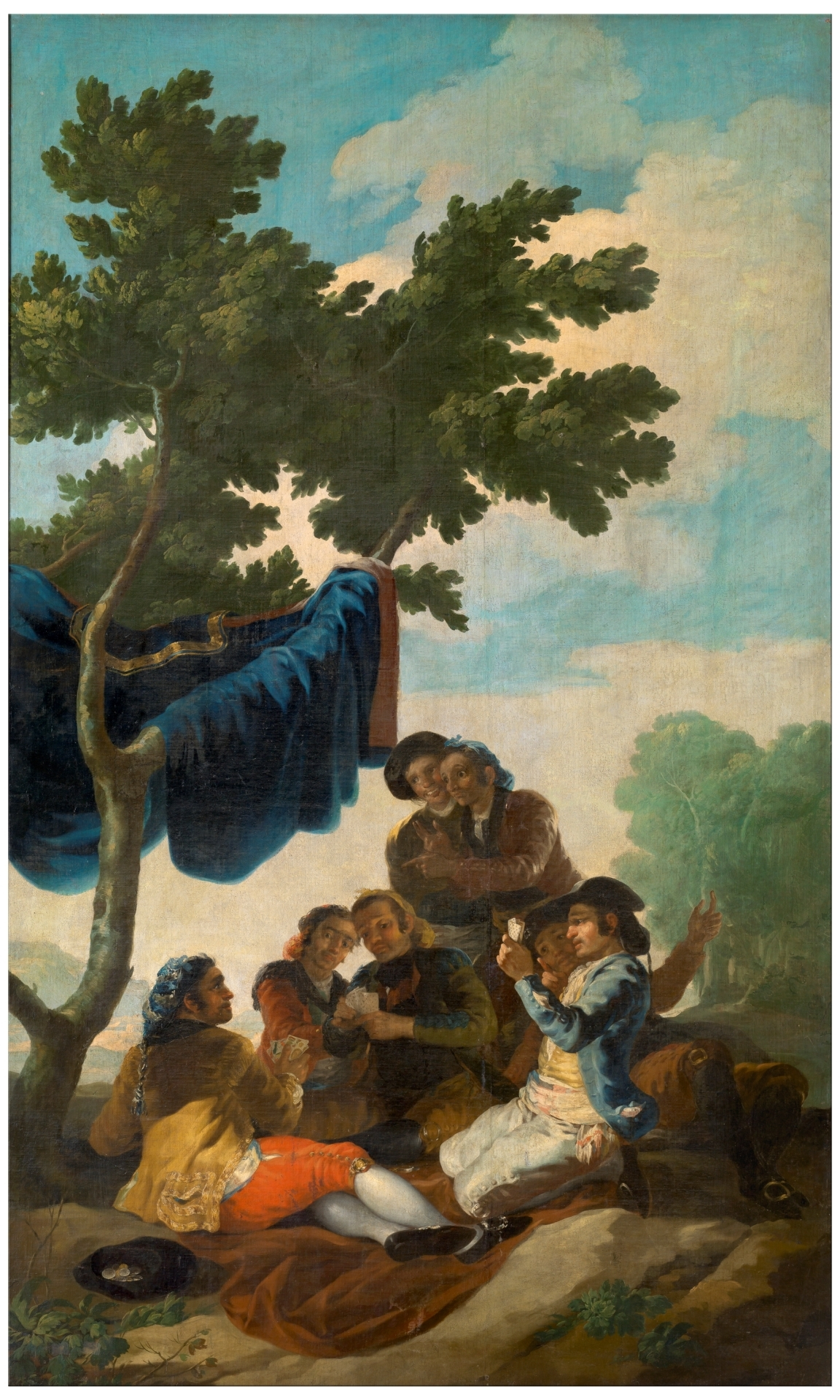
- Artist: Francisco de Goya
- Year: 1777–1778
- Type: Tapestry cartoon
- Medium: Oil on canvas
- Movement: Rococo
- Dimensions: 295 cm × 272 cm (116 in × 107 in)
- Location: Museo del Prado, Madrid
- Accession: Gassier-Wilson: 82

The Card Players (Spanish: Jugadores de naipes) is a painting by Francisco de Goya, created in 1777, belonging to the second series of tapestry cartoons intended for the dining room of the Prince of Asturias in the El Pardo Royal Palace.

== Context ==
All the paintings in the second series were designed for the dining room of the Prince of Asturias, who would later become Charles IV of Spain and his wife Maria Luisa of Parma, at the El Pardo Palace. The painting was delivered to the Royal Tapestry Factory on January 25, 1778.

It was considered lost until 1869 when the canvas was rediscovered in the basement of the Royal Palace of Madrid by Gregorio Cruzada Villaamil. It was subsequently transferred to the Museo del Prado in 1870 by decrees dated January 19 and February 9, 1870, where it is now displayed in Room 85. The painting was first listed in the Museo del Prado catalog in 1876.

The series included Picnic on the Banks of the Manzanares, Dance on the Banks of the Manzanares, The Fight at the Venta Nueva, The Fight at the Gallo Inn, The Andalusian Promenade, The Drinker, The Parasol, The Kite, The Card Players, Children Inflating a Bladder, Boys Picking Fruit, and The Robbery.

== Analysis ==
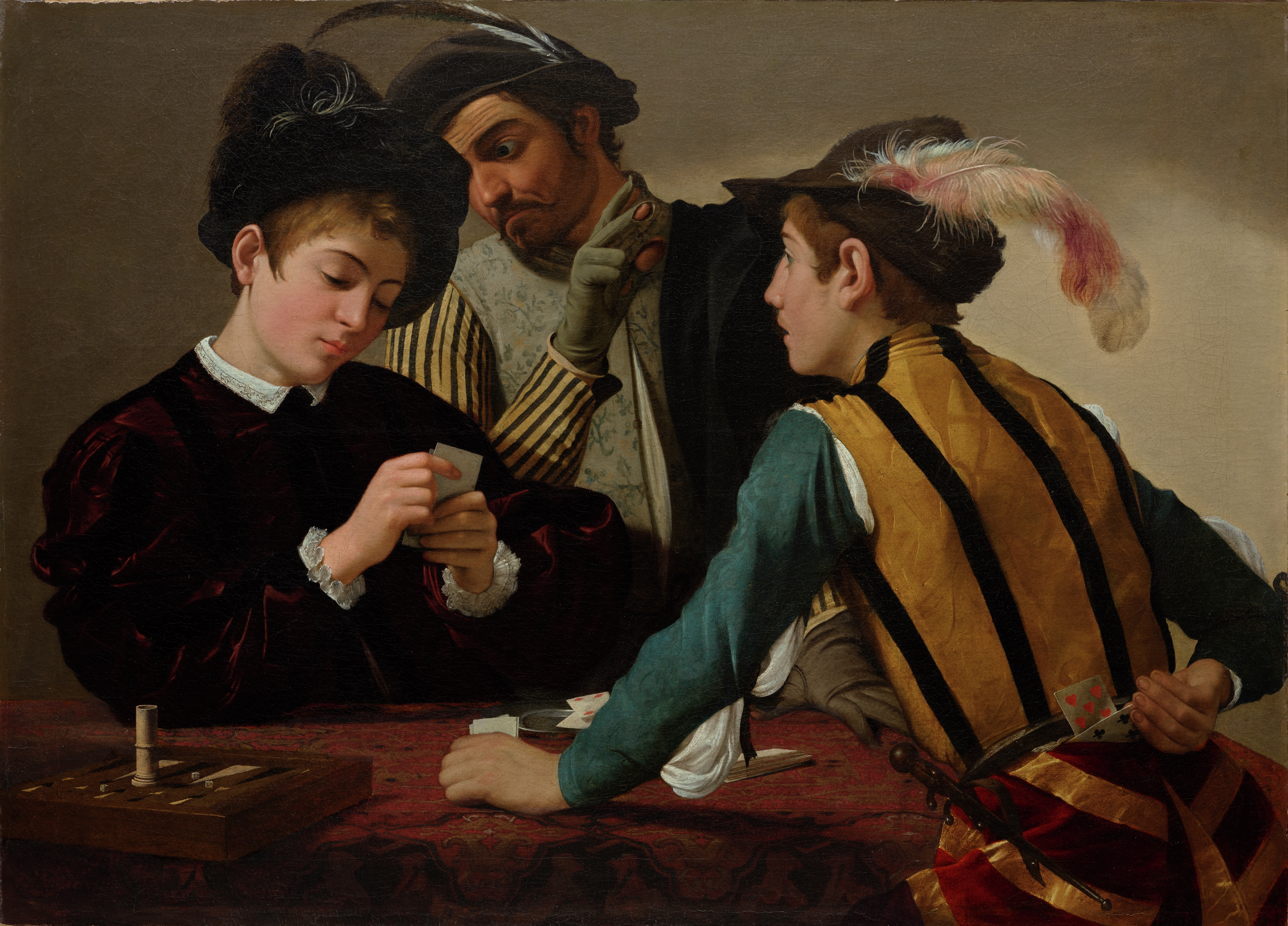
The Cardsharps by Caravaggio.

A group of majos is playing cards outdoors, under the shade of a tree. One of them stands behind a player, signaling to his partner to ensure a win. The figure of the cheat was a common trope in 18th-century iconography, which the artist develops with unmatched mastery. The canvas is heavily inspired by The Cardsharps by Caravaggio, painted in 1595.

This is one of the most striking and original works Goya undertook as he immersed himself in the world of the majos. The cheat engages the viewer in the scene. It is a natural composition with a classical use of the pyramidal structure. The lighting enhances the vivid colors.

The brushstrokes are loose, though the scene appears highly detailed at first glance. The arrangement of the figures creates a pleasing spatial balance.

Goya was gradually rising in social status and took care to produce paintings with contrasts of light and shadow to heighten the realism of his scenes.

== See also ==
- Francisco Goya's tapestry cartoons

== Bibliography ==
- Ribot Martín, Domènec (2000). Goya (in Spanish). Barcelona: Susaeta. ISBN 978-84-305-9689-8.
- Luna, Juan J.; Al. (1996). Goya, 250 aniversario (in Spanish). Madrid: Museo del Prado. ISBN 84-87317-48-0. Luna.
