= Adoration of the Magi (Coecke van Aelst, Madrid) =

Painting by Pieter Coecke van Aelst

The Adoration of the Magi
- La Adoración de los Magos
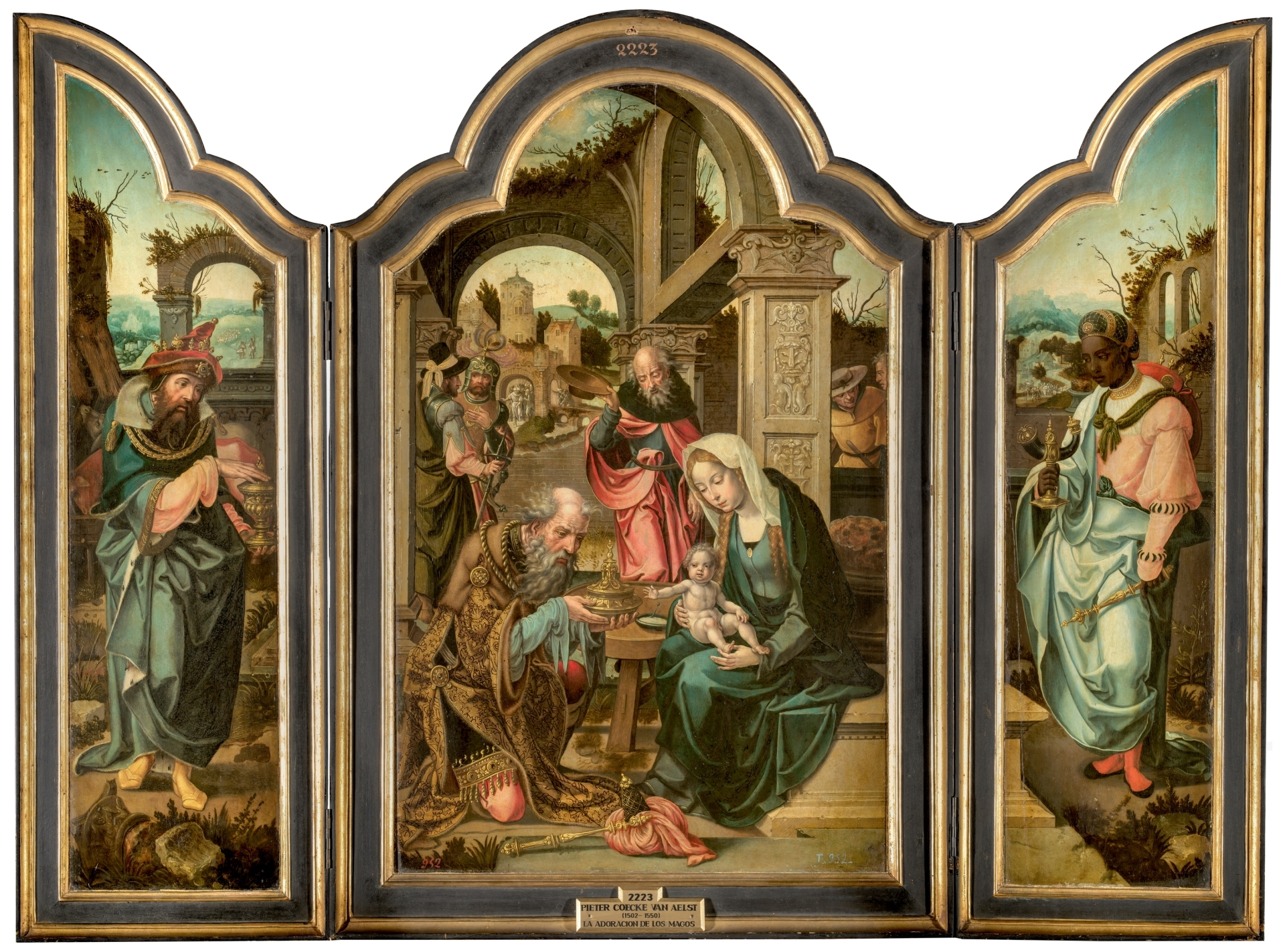
- Artist: Pieter Coecke van Aelst
- Year: 1530
- Dimensions: 102 cm (40 in) × 137.5 cm (54.1 in)
- Location: Museo del Prado
- Collection: Museo del Prado, Museo de la Trinidad
- Accession no.: P002223
- Identifiers: RKDimages ID: 287904

The Adoration of the Magi (Spanish: La Adoración de los Magos; Dutch: Aanbidding der wijzen), is a c. 1530 oil on panel triptych of the Nativity by the Flemish artist Pieter Coecke van Aelst in the collection of the Museo del Prado in Madrid.

== Background story ==
The triptych depicts the story of the Adoration of the Magi which is only recounted in the Gospel of Matthew of the Christian Bible. According to the story, after the birth of Jesus, wise men or Magi travelled from the east following a star to find newly-born Jesus. When they found him lying in a manger, they bowed down and worshipped him and laid before him gifts of gold, frankincense, and myrrh. While the Gospel story does not mention the number, position or nationality of the Magi, Western Christian traditions developed on the story by making inferences from the gifts given by the Magi. These led to a belief or assumption that the Magi were three kings who had come from the three known contintents of that time (Asia, Europe and Africa). In due course the Magi were also ascribed names.

== Description of the painting ==
The triptych depicts over its three panels a continuous idealised manger scene with the three kings holding their gifts of gold, frankincense and myrrh. King Caspar stands in the left panel, King Melchior is kneeling in the central panel, and King Balthazar stands in the right panel.

The composition is similar to the workshop version of the Adoration of the Magi in the Rijksmuseum in Amsterdam in which Balthazar and Joseph are in the outer wings and Caspar in the central panel behind the kneeling Melchior.

== Provenance ==
This painting was earlier in the collection of Museo de la Trinidad in Madrid where in 1865 it was catalogued as by Lucas van Leyden.

== Other treatments in the same time period ==
Various triptychs of the subject in a similar arrangement were made by Coecke van Aelst, his workshop and other Flemish masters such as Joos van Cleve, the Master of Hoogstraeten, Jan van Dornicke and the Master of 1518:

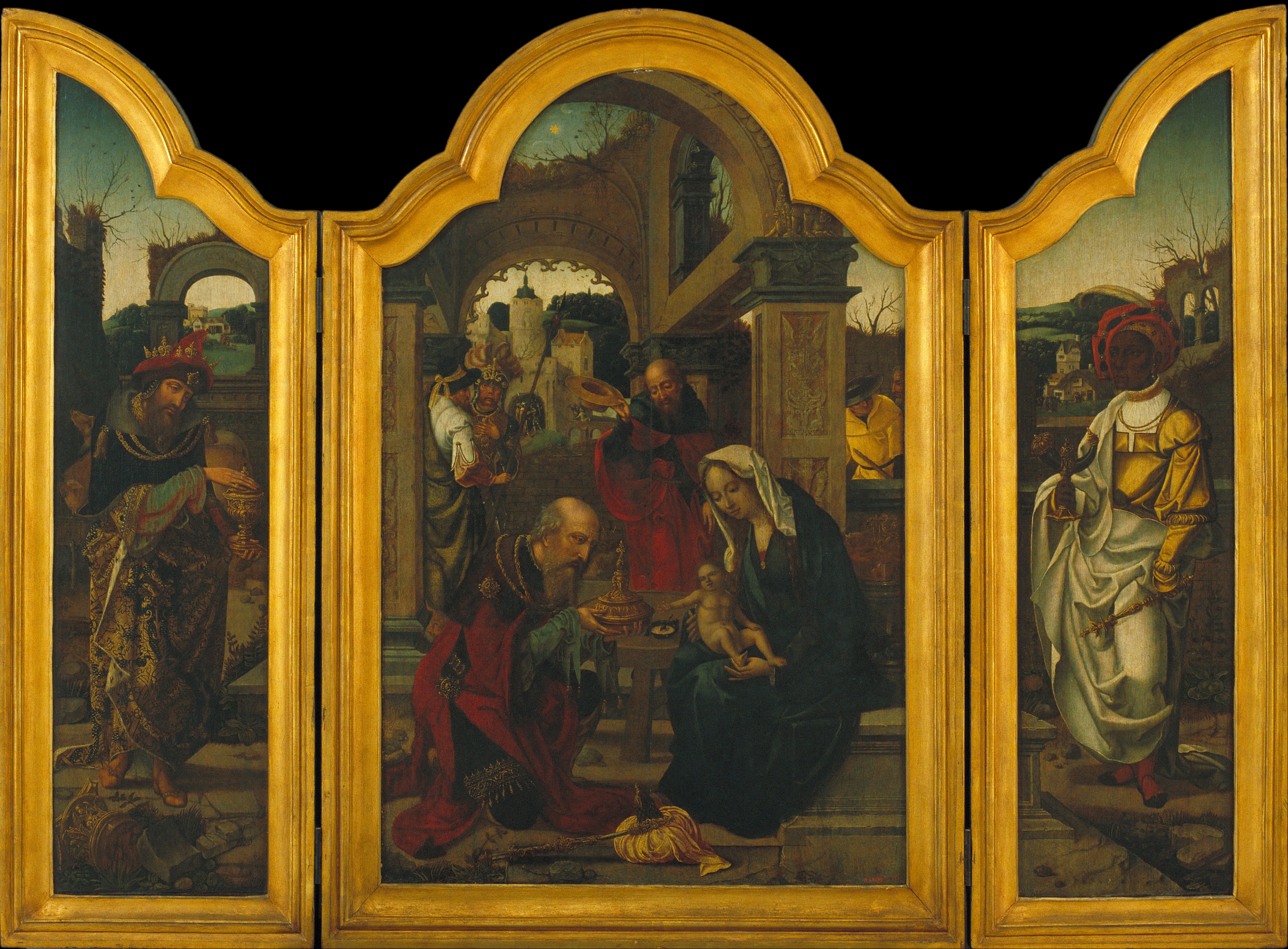
Triptych by Jan van Dornicke in Barcelona

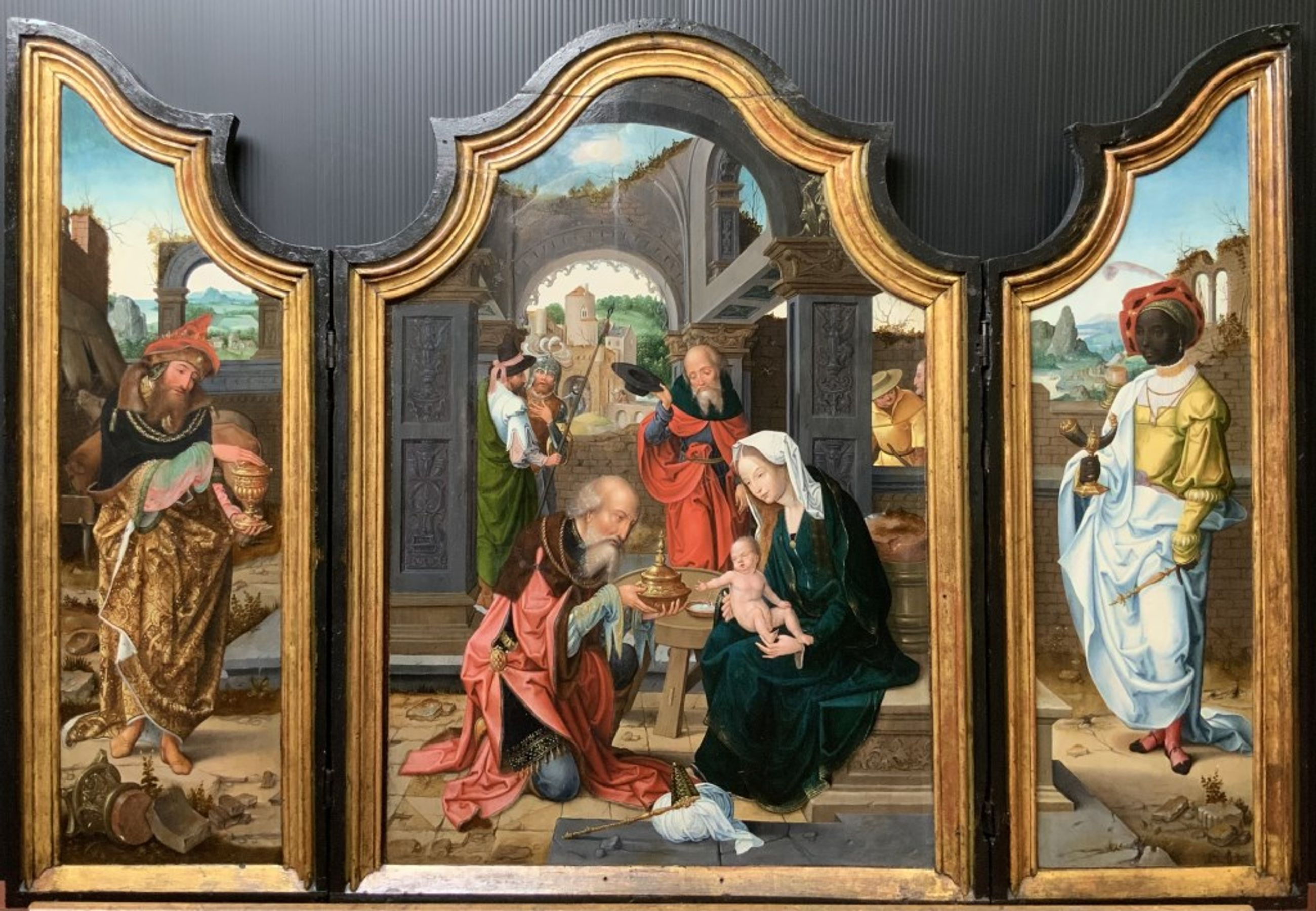
Triptych by Master of 1518 in Lille

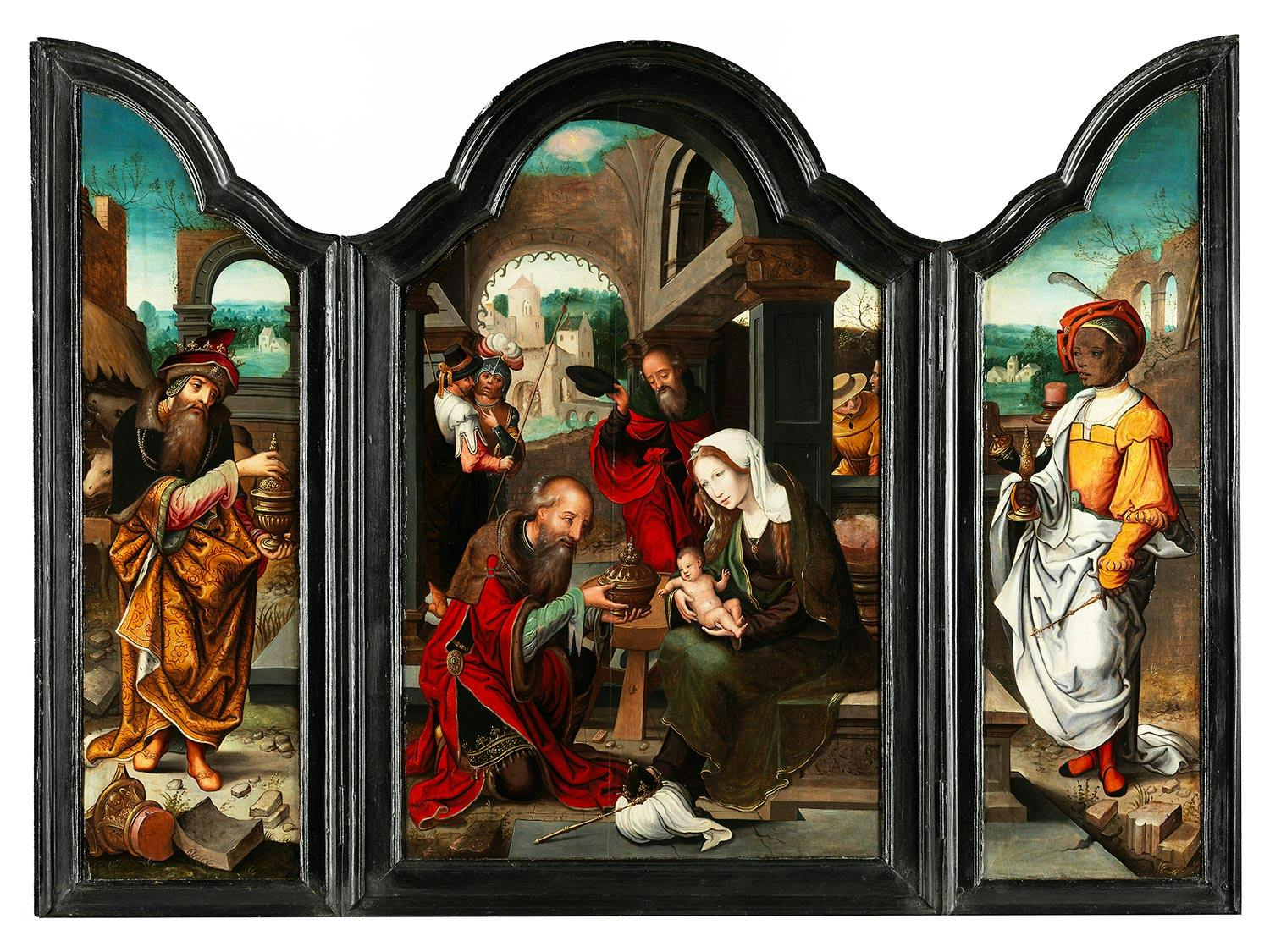
Triptych by Master of 1518 sold by Hampel auctions March 31, 2022

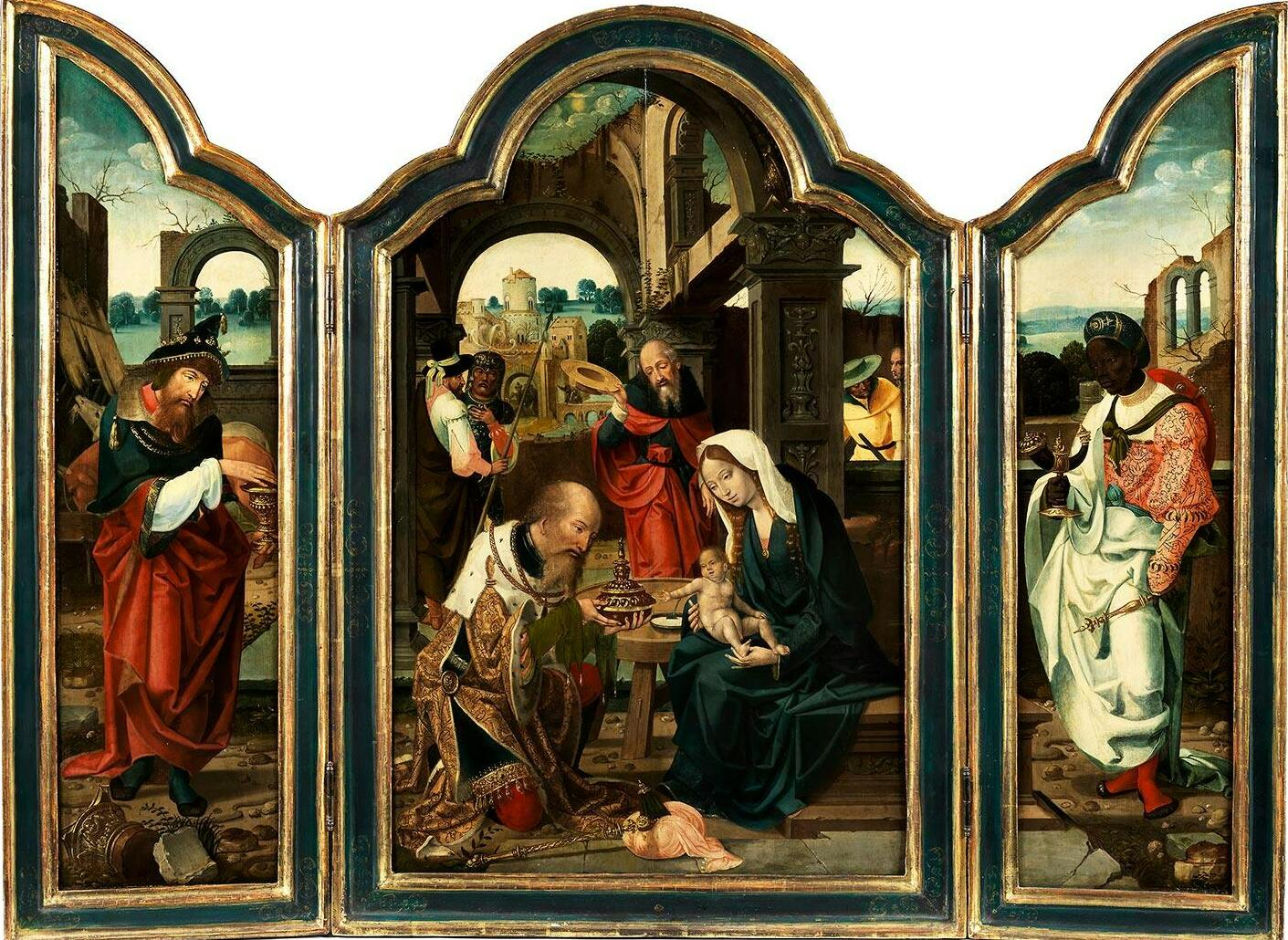
Triptych by Master of 1518 sold by Hampel auctions September 23, 2021

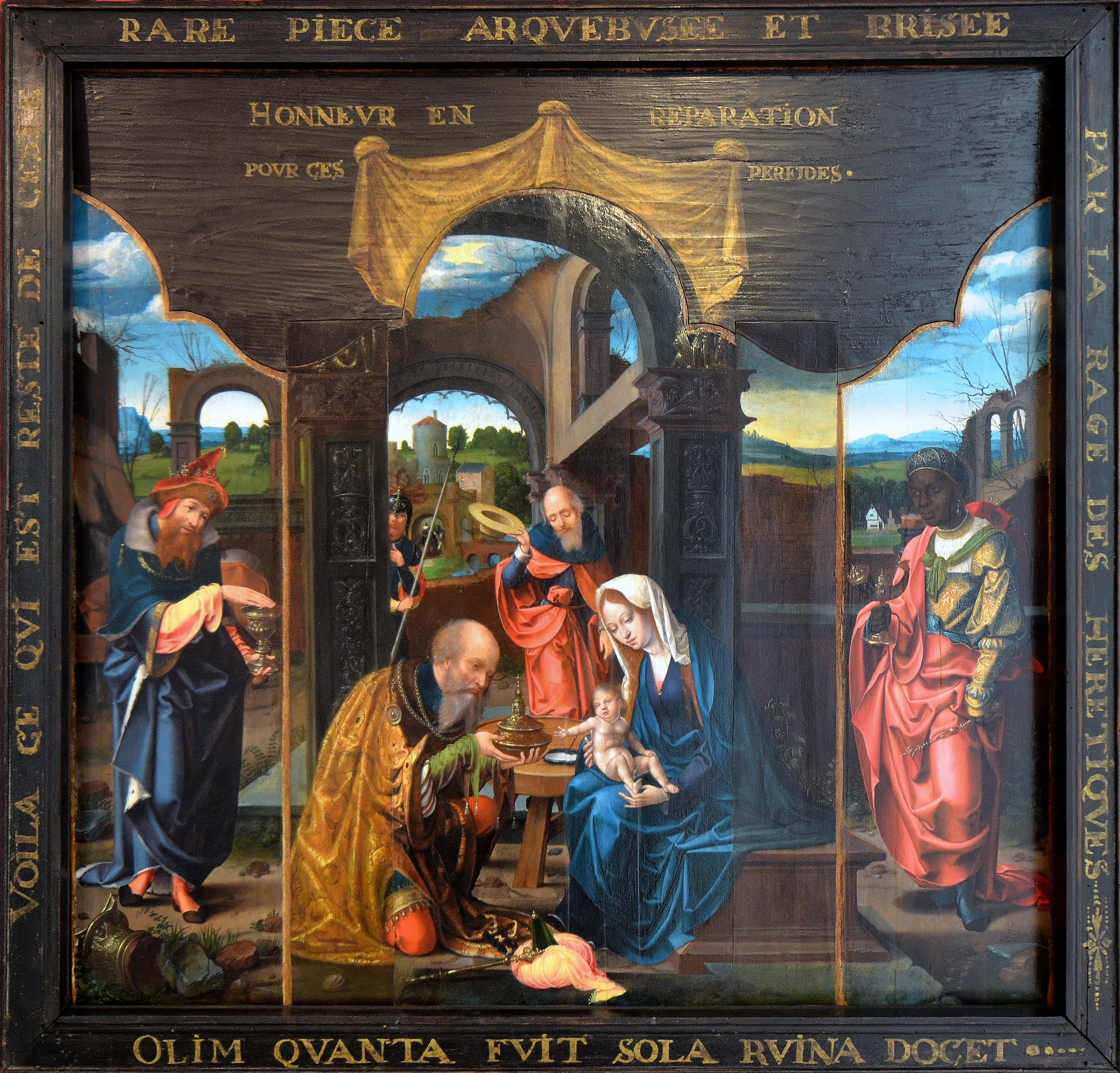
Triptych by Jan van Dornicke in Chambéry (Savoie)

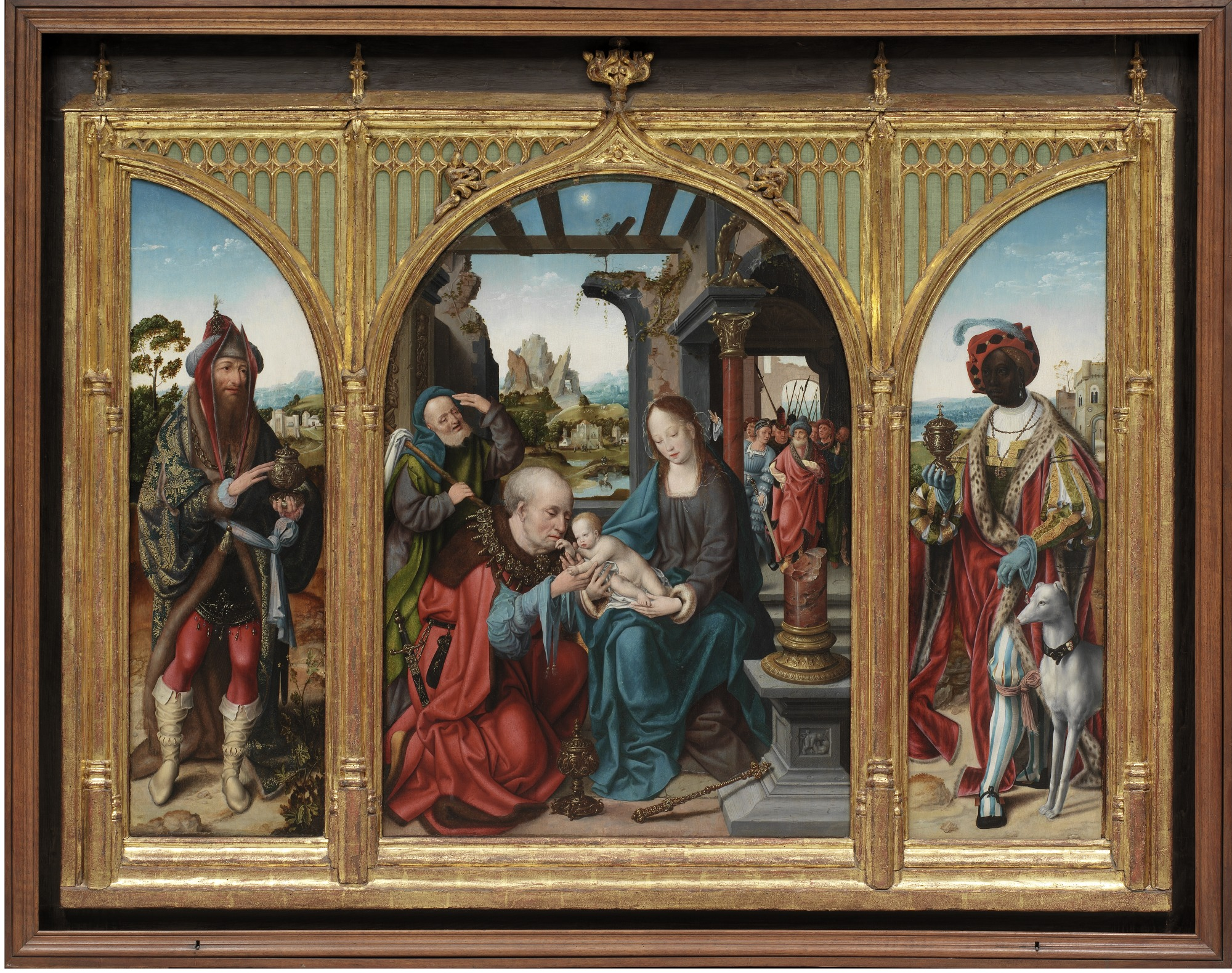
Triptych by Joos van Cleve in Detroit

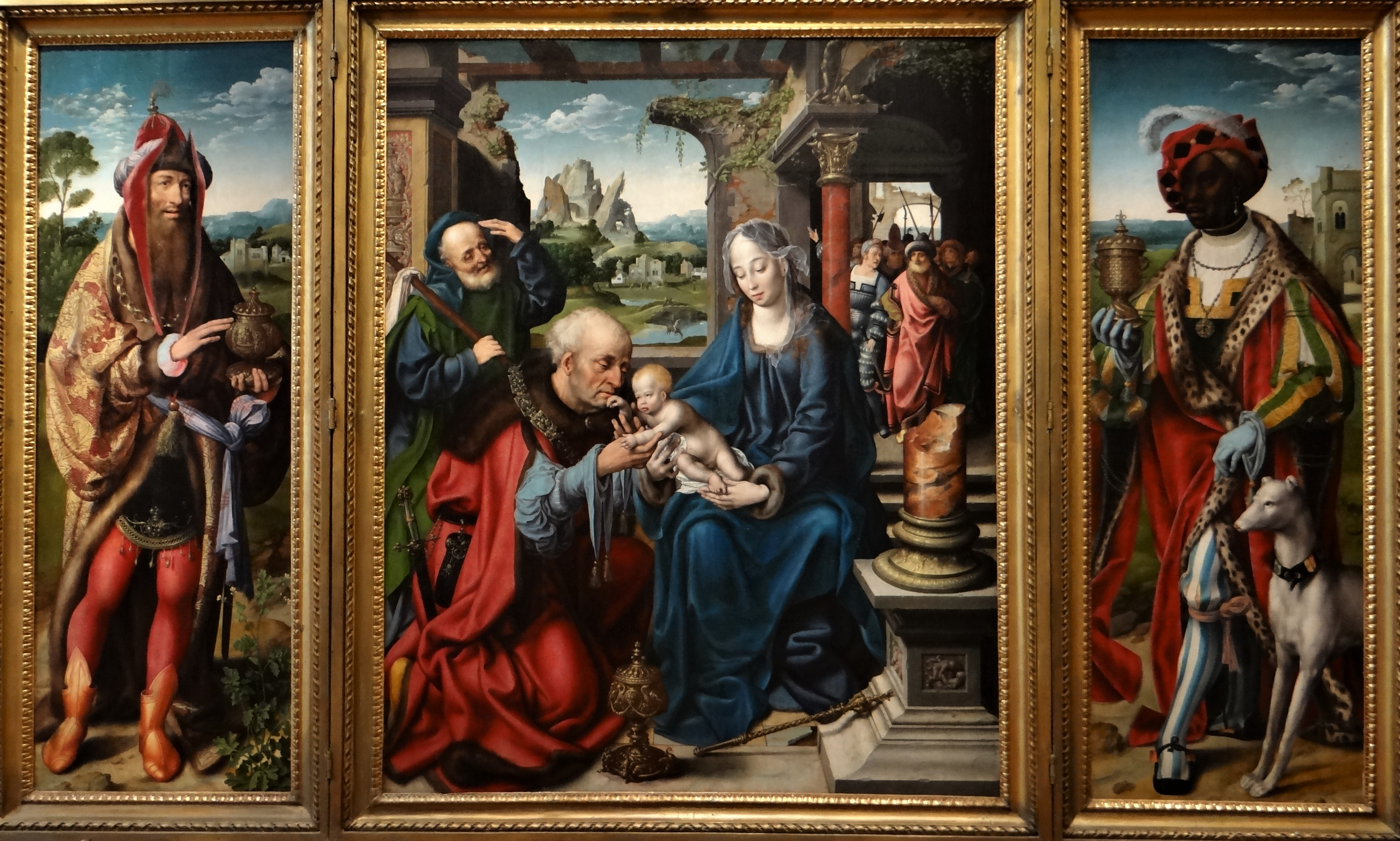
Triptych by Joos van Cleve in Naples

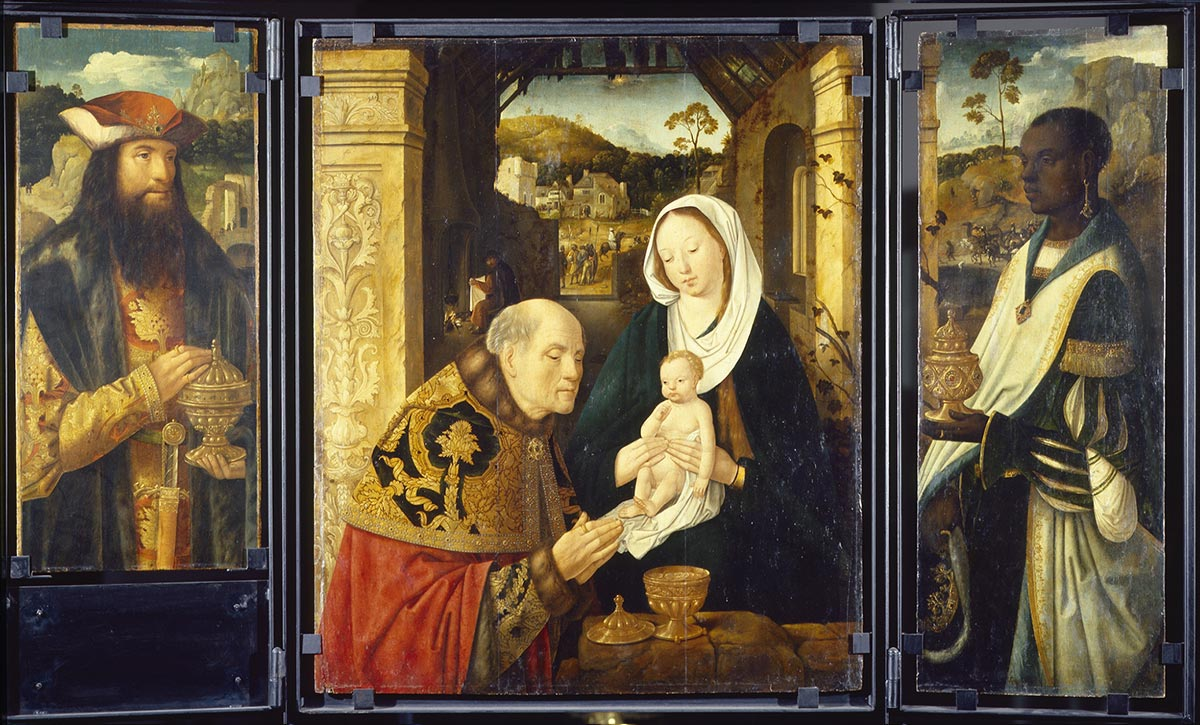
Triptych by Master of Hoogstraeten in Savona
