= Adoration of the Magi (Workshop of Coecke van Aelst, Rijksmuseum) =

Painting by (workshop of) Pieter Coecke van Aelst

Triptych with Adoration of the Magi
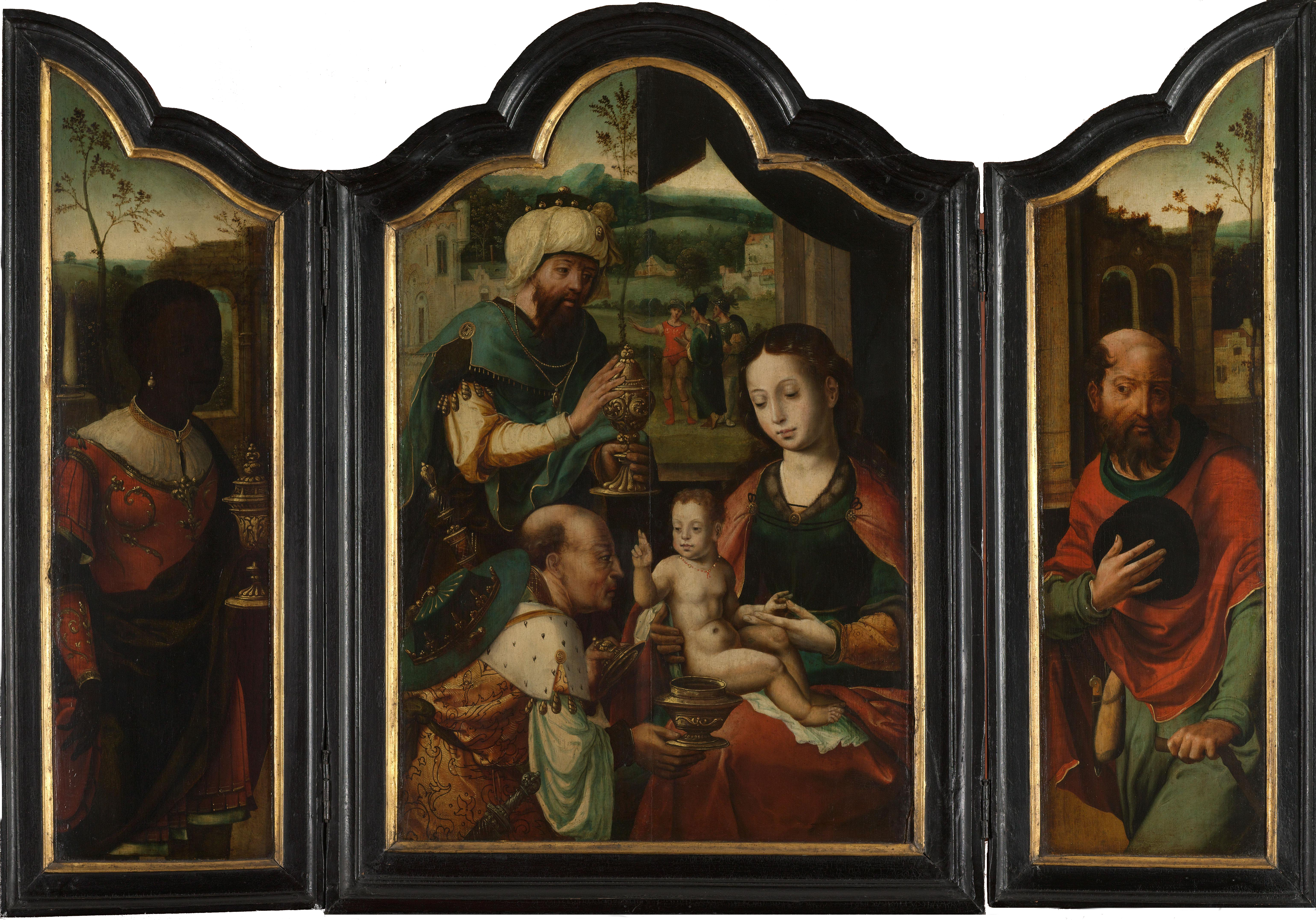
- Artist: Workshop of Pieter Coecke van Aelst
- Year: 1530
- Medium: oil paint, panel
- Subject: adoration of the Magi
- Dimensions: 75 cm (30 in) × 50 cm (20 in)
- Location: Rijksmuseum, Kingdom of the Netherlands
- Accession: SK-A-2594
- Website: www.rijksmuseum.nl/nl/collectie/SK-A-2594

Triptych of the Adoration of the Magi (Dutch: Drieluik met de aanbidding der koningen), is a c. 1530 oil on panel triptych of the Nativity produced by the workshop of the Flemish artist Pieter Coecke van Aelst. It is in the collection of the Rijksmuseum in Amsterdam.

== Background story ==
The triptych depicts the story of the Adoration of the Magi which is only recounted in the Gospel of Matthew of the Christian Bible. According to the story, after the birth of Jesus, wise men or Magi travelled from the east following a star to find newly born Jesus. When they found him lying in a manger, they bowed down and worshipped him and laid before him gifts of gold, frankincense, and myrrh. While the Gospel story does not mention the number, position or nationality of the Magi, Western Christian traditions developed on the story by making inferences from the gifts given by the Magi. These led to a belief or assumption that the Magi were three kings who had come from the three known contintents of that time (Asia, Europe and Africa). In due course the Magi were also ascribed names.

== Description of the painting ==
The triptych depicts over its three panels a continuous idealised manger scene with the three kings holding their gifts of gold, frankincense and myrrh. King Balthazar stands in the left panel, King Caspar stands behind King Melchior kneeling in the central panel, and Saint Joseph with cane and hat in hand, stands in the right panel giving some distinct side-eye to the nativity scene on the left.

The composition is similar to the autograph Adoration of the Magi in the Museo del Prado in which both the kings Caspar and Balthazar are in the outer wings while Joseph is standing in the central panel behind the kneeling Melchior. While the triptych's composition relies heavily on 15th century models, the integration of the wings into the central composition is an innovation. This new approach created symmetry and breadth and was widely used by artists in subsequent generations. The treatment of the various figures in the composition shows the influence of Italian Renaissance painting which Coecke van Aelst studied under his master Bernard van Orley and during his presumed stay in Italy.

== Provenance ==
The work was once in the collection of Cornelis Hoogendijk in the Hague who gave it on loan to the Rijksmuseum in 1907. It was donated by his heirs in 1912.

== Other treatments in the same time period ==
Various triptychs of the subject in a similar arrangement were made by Coecke van Aelst, his workshop and other Flemish masters such as Joos van Cleve, the Master of Hoogstraeten, Jan van Dornicke, the Master of 1518 and the Master of the Antwerp Adoration:

Coecke van Aelst and/or workshop

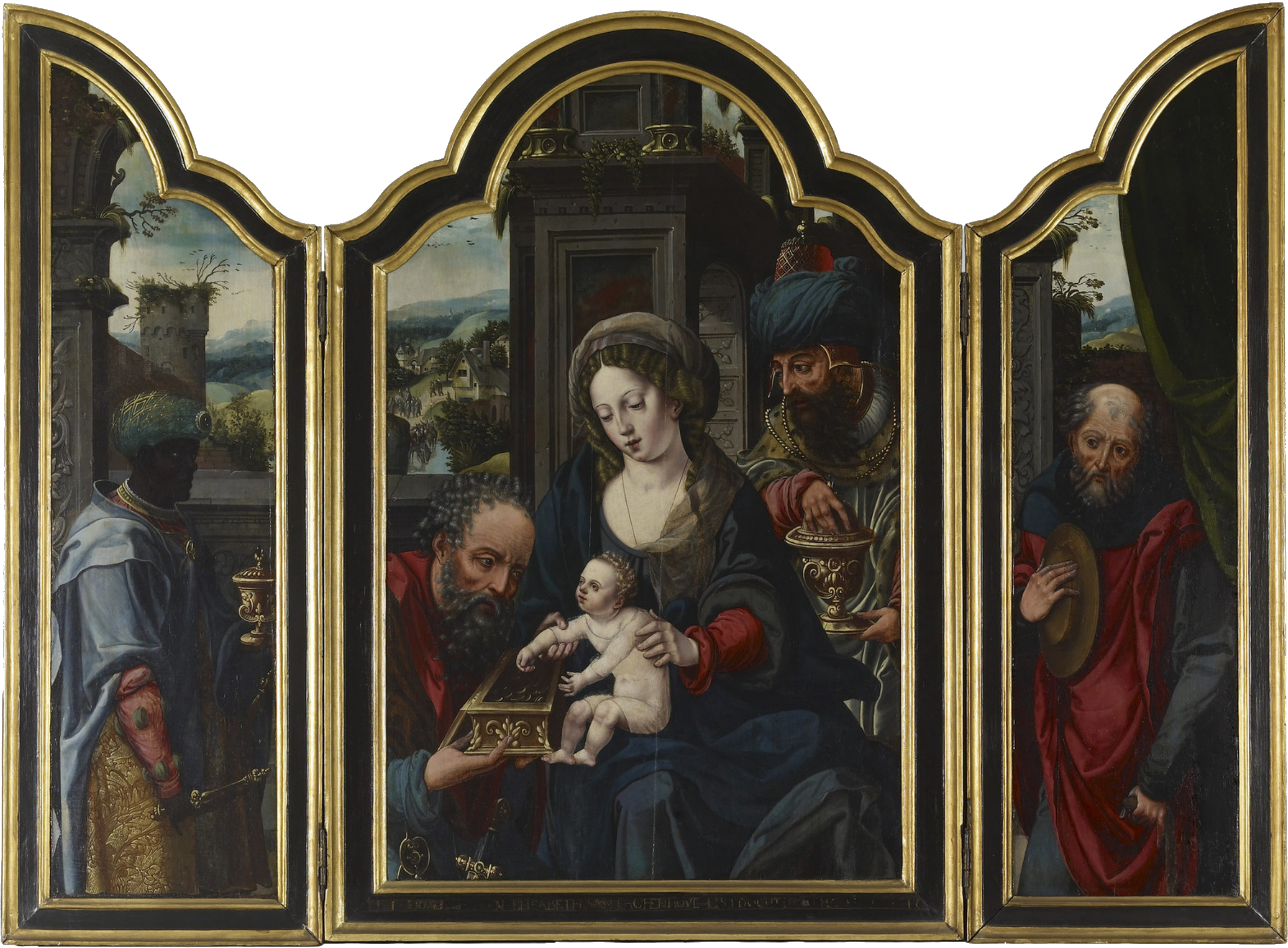
Walters Art Museum

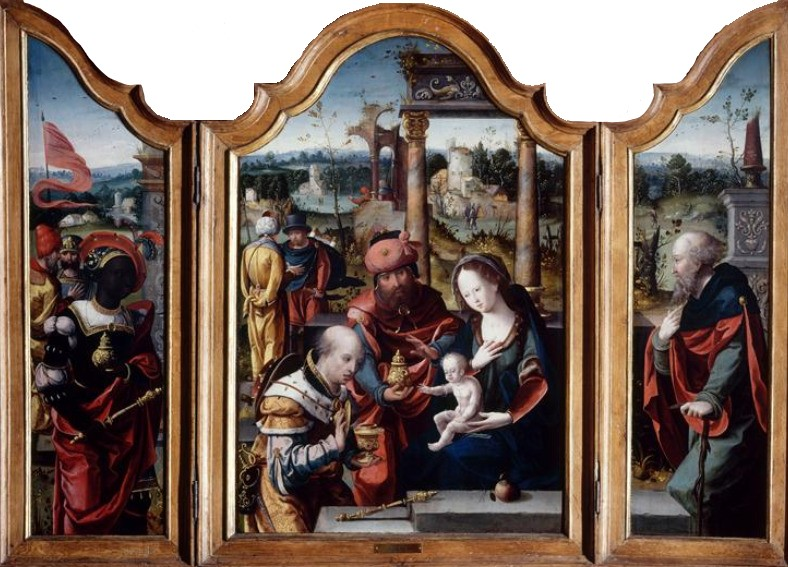
Musée des Beaux-Arts de Valenciennes

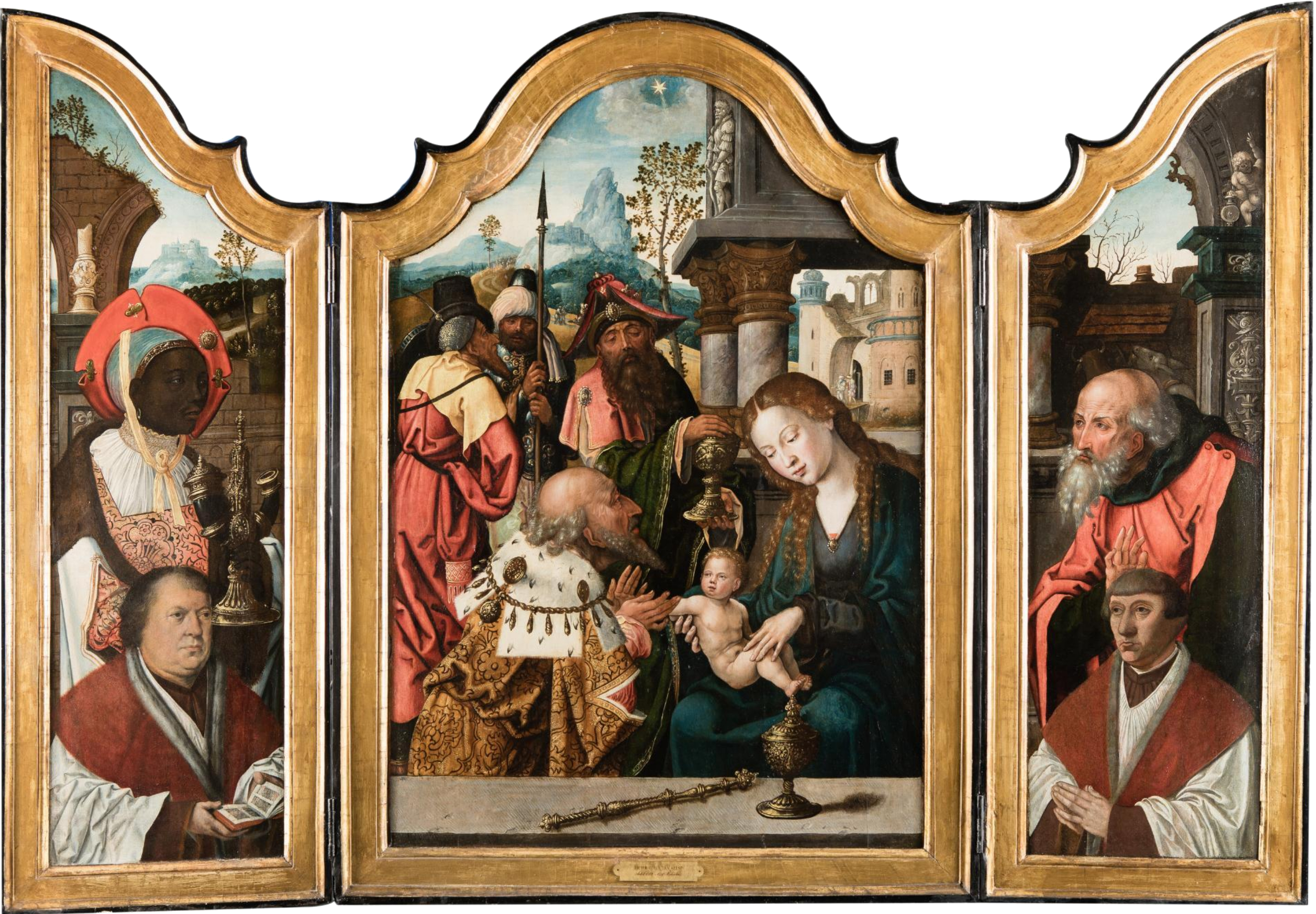
Private collection

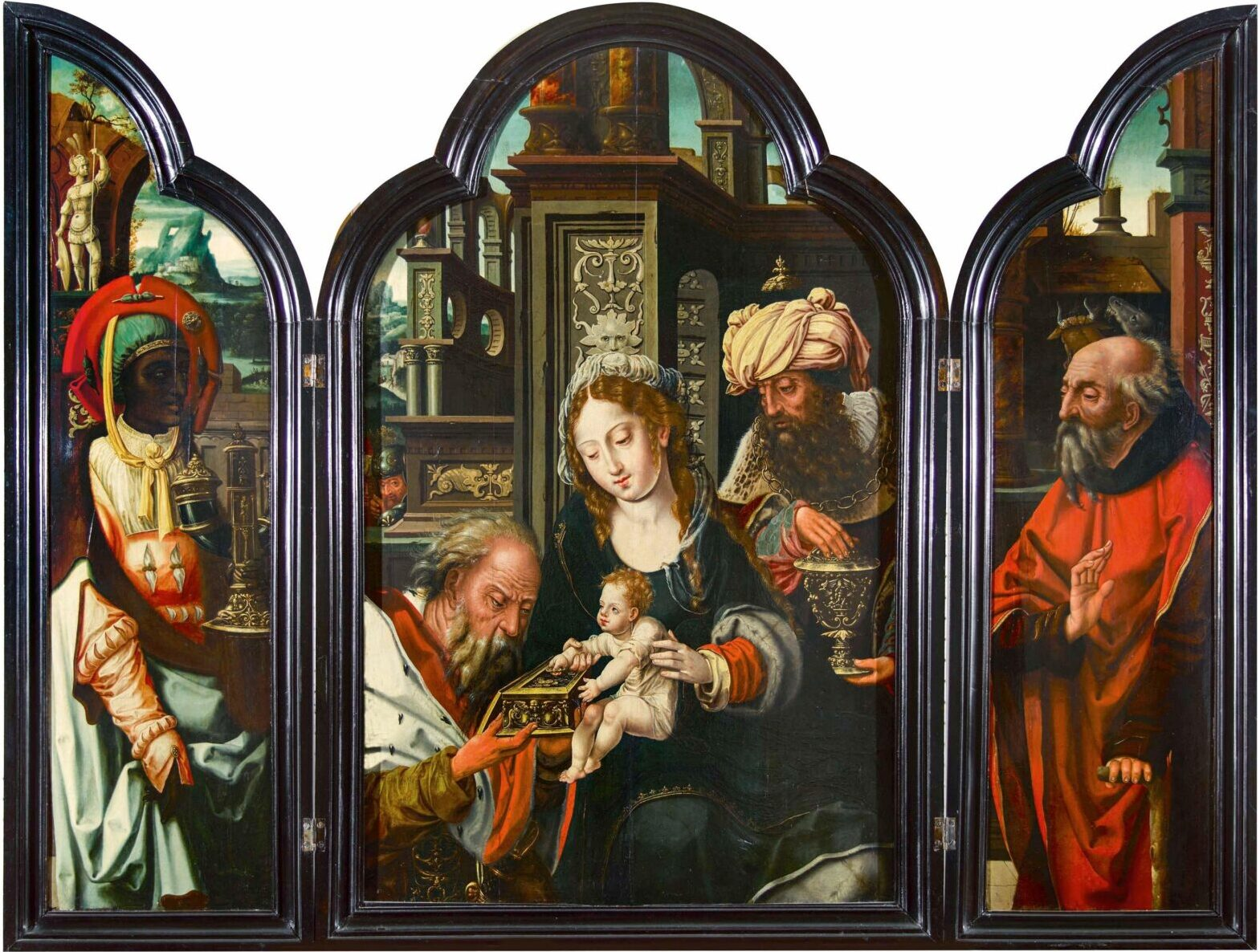
Private collection in Guernsey

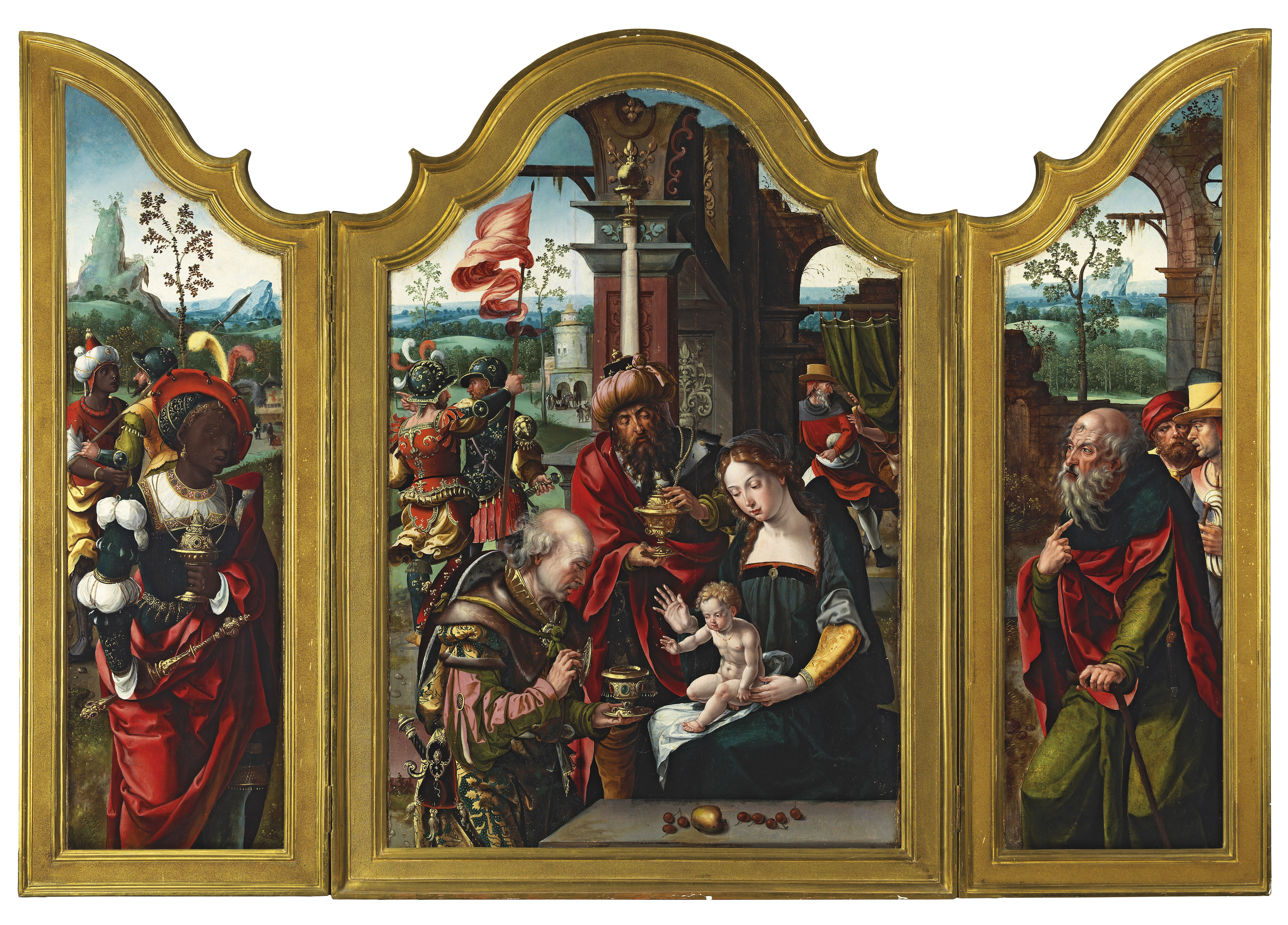
The Phoebus Foundation

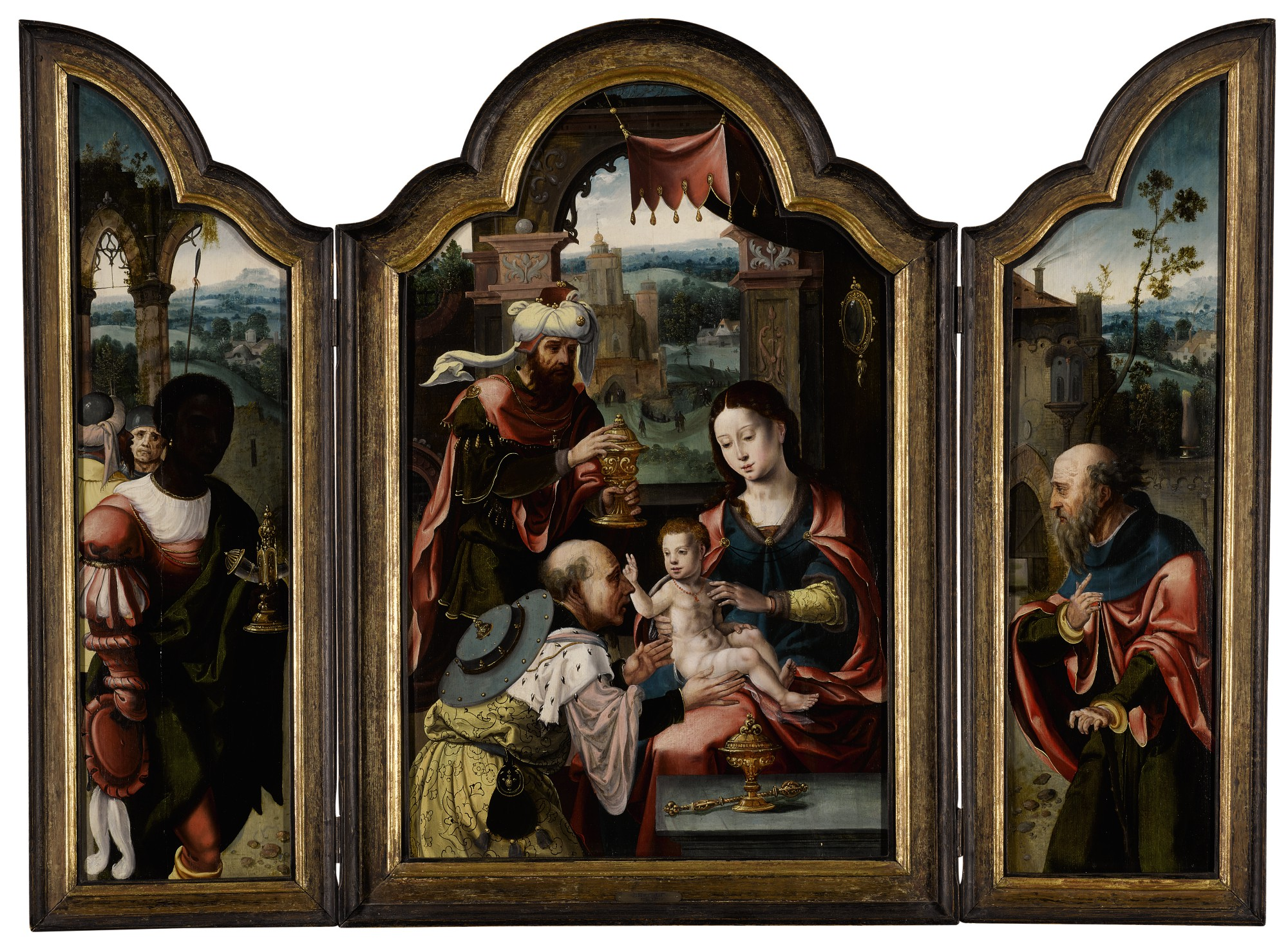
Private collection
Other artists

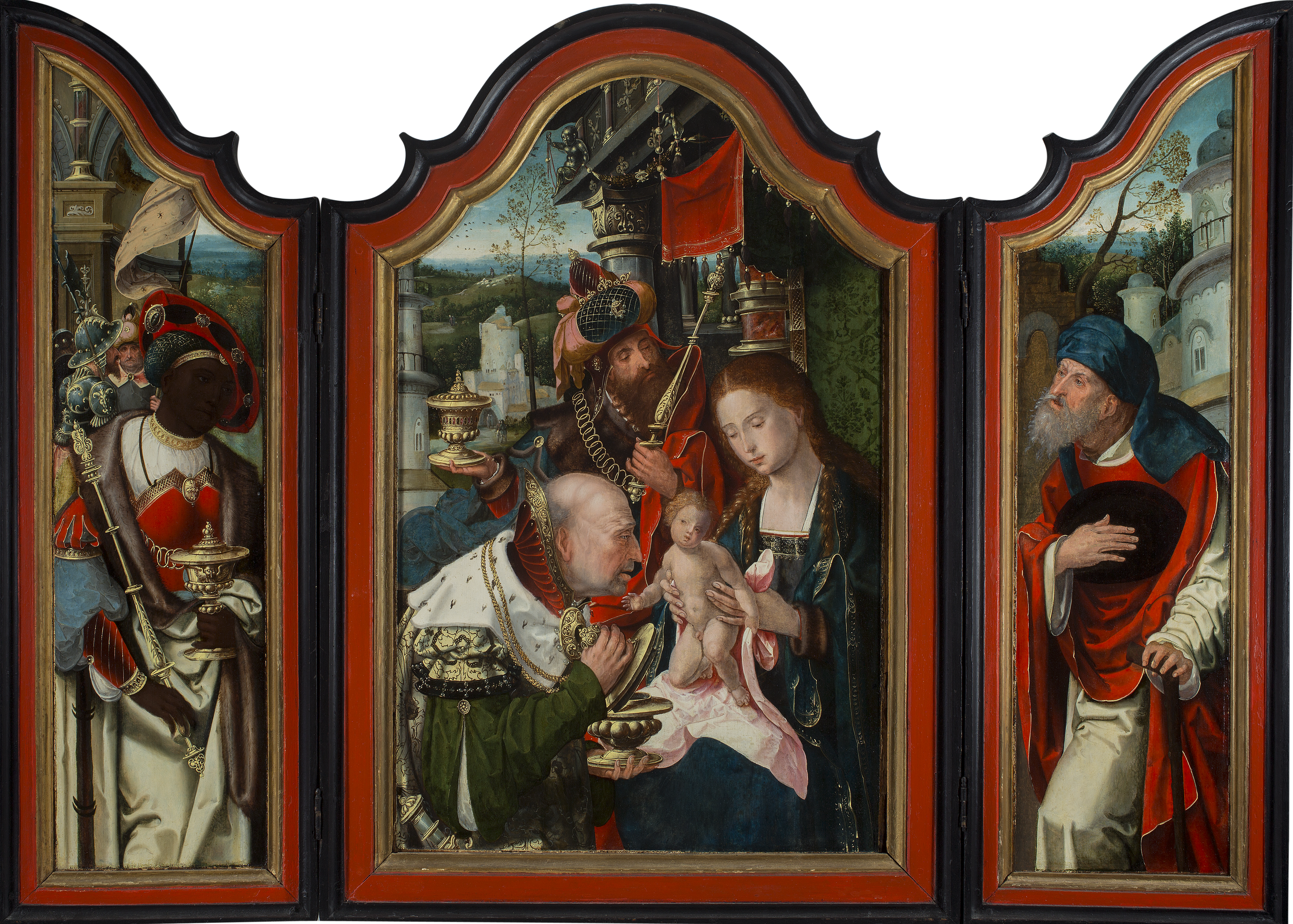
Master of 1518, in Utrecht

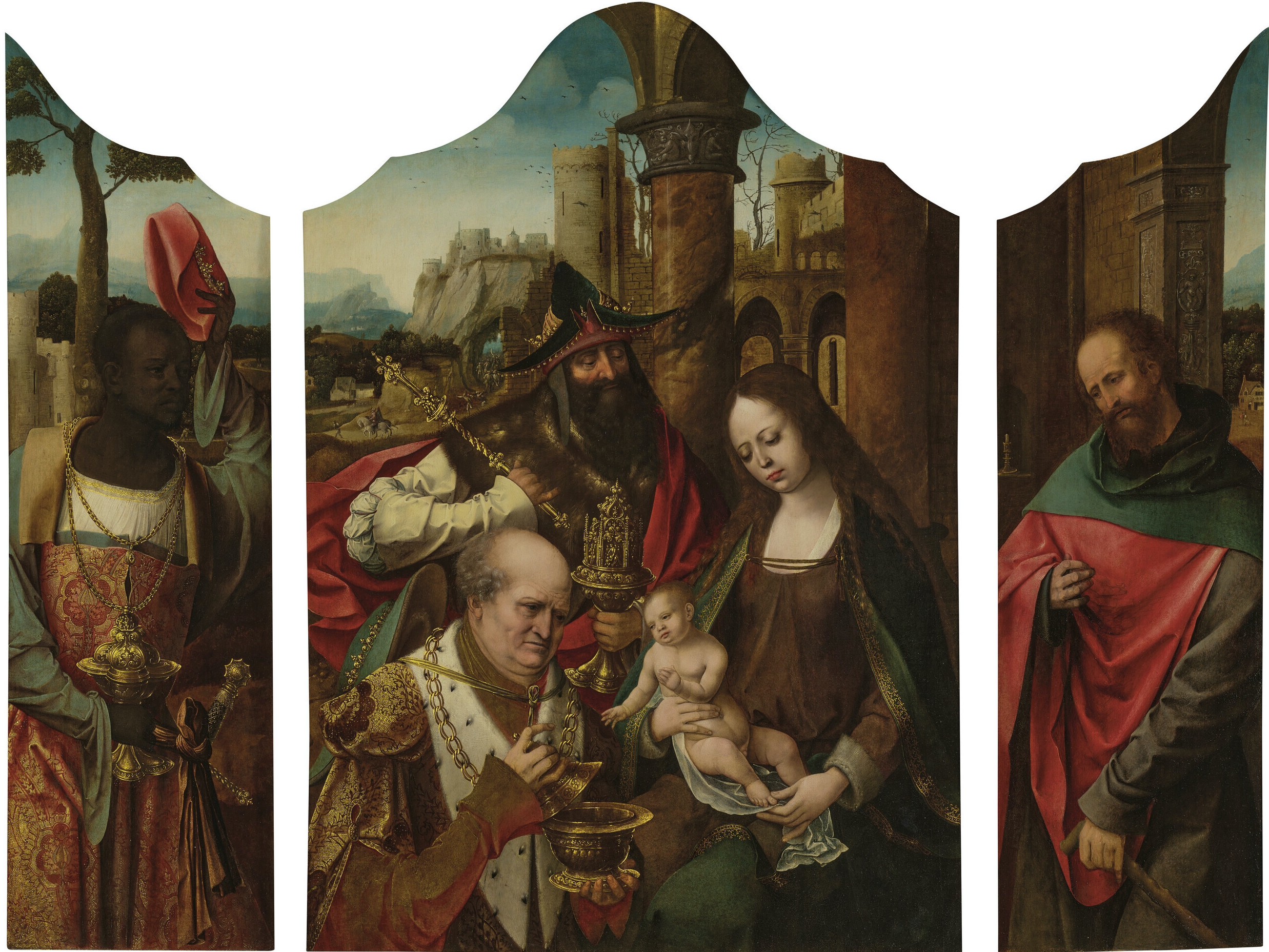
Master of the Antwerp Adoration, sold by Christie's 6–07–2023
