= Museo de la Trinidad =

The Museo de la Trinidad, or Museo Nacional de la Trinidad, was a Spanish national museum of painting and sculpture in Madrid from 1837 to 1872. Its collection was removed and merged with the Museo del Prado in 1872. It was called the 'Museum of the Holy Trinity' after the name of its location (a convent no longer extant). It was created as a result of the confiscation of church property in Spain called the Mendizábal confiscations.

Though it was first opened to the public on July 24, 1838 to celebrate Queen regent Maria Christina's name-day, it was soon closed and reopened on May 2, 1842 by the twelve-year-old Queen Isabella II of Spain who had an inventory drawn up in 1854 and expanded the collection with acquisitions and contemporary works from her National Exhibitions of Fine Arts that she began in 1856, making it the first national Spanish public art museum with state-owned works. Due to lack of exhibition space in the cramped former convent, most of the items were not on display, and few efforts were made to document the provenance of the various pieces, leading to retroactive provenance work that continues to this day. In 1862, the art critic and historian Gregorio Cruzada Villaamil became deputy director of the museum, and he was the first to properly review and catalog the inventories of the collection. Until then, there was only the queen's list drawn up in 1854. Though his catalog was published in 1865, it only described the part of the collection he considered to be the most significant. Of the 1733 paintings that appear in the 1854 inventory, he cataloged only 603, noting that works previously in the collection of Infante Sebastian Gabriel seized in 1835 had been returned to him in 1861.

Shortly after the revolution in September 1868, there was an initiative to merge two museums, the 'Trinidad' and the Prado, both already national. By decrees of the regency government of November 25, 1870 and March 22, 1872, the Museo de la Trinidad was closed down and its collections were transferred to the Prado (the former 'Royal Museum'). In fact, only 83 of 'Trinidad' works were on display in the Prado after 1873, almost all from the inventory of new acquisitions that began in 1856. Most of the other works were distributed to various locations or deposited in the Villanueva building. Among the most valuable pieces from the Museo de la Trinidad were those by El Greco, Pedro Berruguete, Juan Bautista Maíno, and Flemish paintings. Over 600 religious works, considered at the time to have little value, have since been lost.
