= The Swing (Goya) =

1779 painting by Francisco Goya

- El columpio (Spanish)
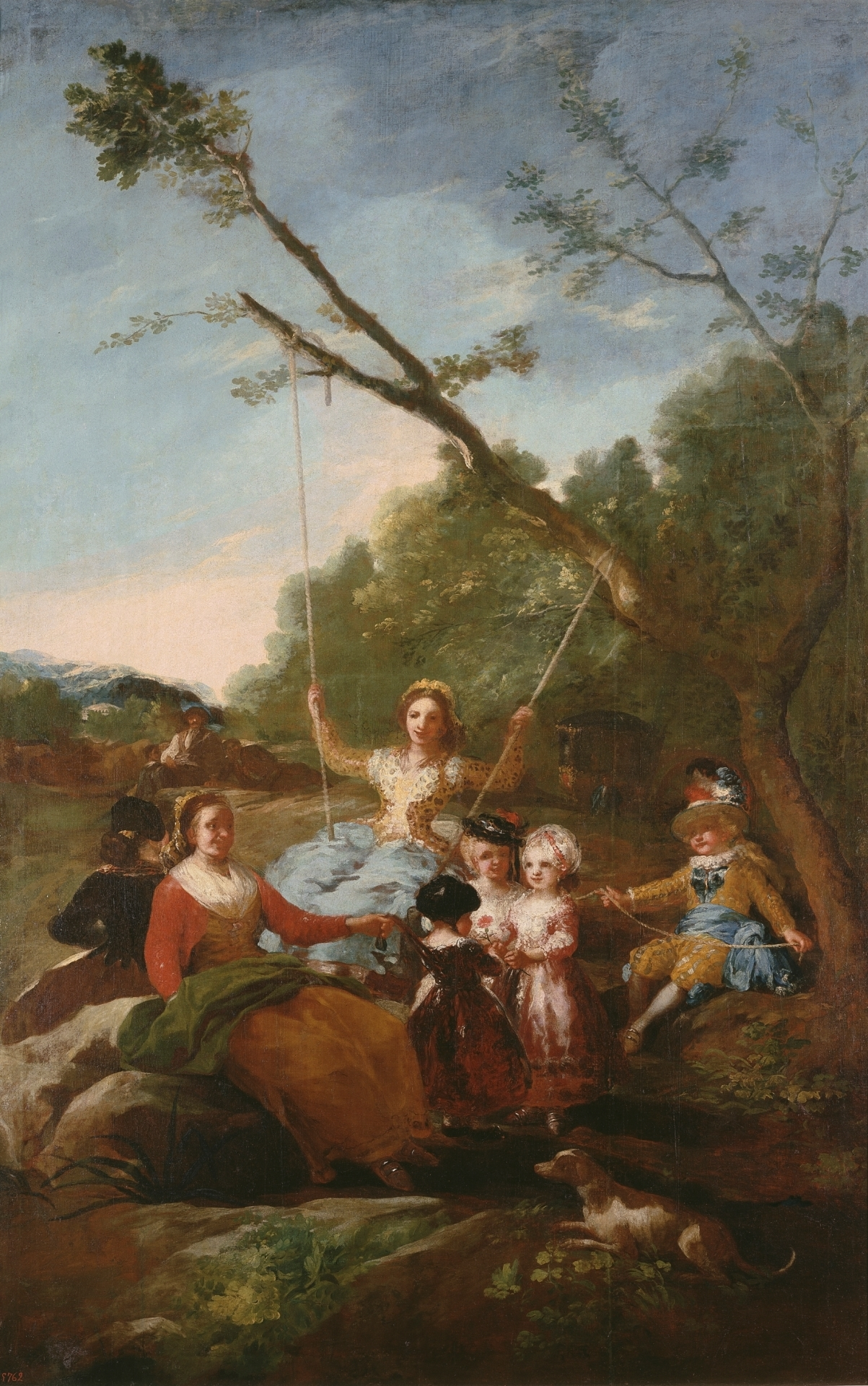
- Oil on canvas
- Artist: Francisco de Goya
- Year: 1779
- Movement: Rococo
- Dimensions: 165 cm × 260 cm (65 in × 100 in)
- Location: Museo del Prado, Madrid

The Swing (in Spanish: El columpio) is the title of a tapestry cartoon designed by Francisco de Goya for the bedroom of the Princes of Asturias in the Palace of El Pardo. It is kept in the Museo del Prado.

The subject of the oil painting is a recurring one in the history of Western art, especially in French painting, with Boucher and Fragonard, exponents of the Rococo. With obvious erotic connotations at the time, Goya may have discarded that sense of the subject, as it is a peaceful, familiar scene. It is the first of a series of thirteen tapestries undertaken in Goya's third series.

== Analysis ==
The scene takes place in the countryside, where three maids are swinging happily while the children they look after are enjoying themselves. The presence of ostentatious clothes on the children is noteworthy, an unmistakable symbol that they belong to the aristocracy. While the children are having fun, one of them swings the maid and another maid holds the youngest child. In the background, a carriage made of blurred spots can be seen, and three shepherds with their flocks complete the scene.

The children receive most of the illumination, as the twilight focuses on them and their clothes. Goya enhances the stain-like effect by applying a rapid brushstroke that years later would be the genesis of the Black Paintings. The greatest influences in the painting come from Rembrandt and Velázquez —"his masters", as Goya acknowledged— whom the painter greatly admired. The atmosphere is, in any case, calm and totally peaceful.

The woman who prevents the girl from walking is not dressed as a servant but as a courtesan. She is possibly a wealthy aristocrat who dresses like a maja, in keeping with the spirit of the times.

With his peculiar spelling, the Aragonese artist described the painting as "a family who have gone out to the country to enjoy themselves, four children and three maids, one of whom is swinging on a rope".

Some authors have seen The Swing as an allegory of the three ages of life, through the children (childhood), the women (youth) and the shepherds in the distance (old age).

It may also be an ambiguous message, representing a meeting between the wet-nurses and the shepherds. This can be deduced from the gazes of the men and the woman with their backs turned.

== Bibliography ==
- CIRLOT, Lourdes (2007). Museo del Prado (in Spanish). Vol. 6 and 7. Madrid: Espasa. ISBN 978-84-674-3810-9.
- MENA MÁRQUEZ, Manuela de (2008). Goya: guía de sala (in Spanish). Madrid: Tf. ISBN 978-84-95452-46-7.
- TOMLINSON, Janis (1993). Francisco de Goya: los cartones para tapices y los comienzos de su carrera en la Corte de Madrid (in Spanish). Madrid: Cátedra. ISBN 84-376-1192-X.
- —, "Cartones para tapices". Enciclopedia del Museo del Prado (in Spanish). 2008.
- TRIADÓ TUR, Juan Ramón (2000). Goya (in Spanish). Barcelona: Susaeta. ISBN 84-305-9689-5.
