= Gregorio Cruzada Villaamil =

Spanish art historian

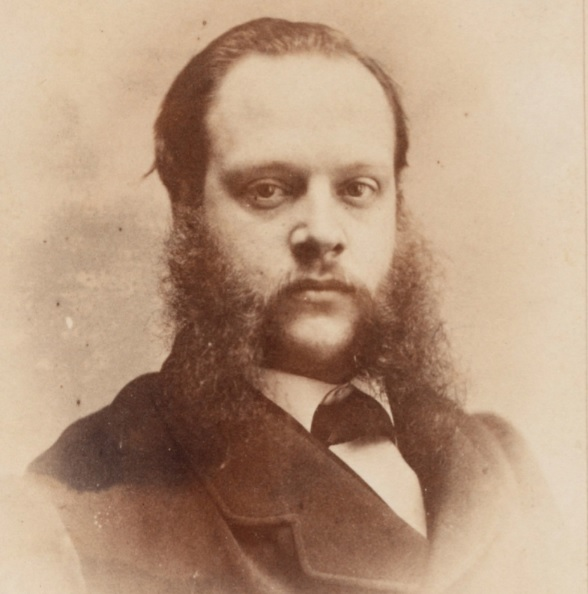
- Born: 1832; Alicante
- Died: November 29, 1884 (aged 51–52); Madrid

Gregorio Cruzada Villaamil (1832 – November 29, 1884) was a Spanish art historian, interested in the art of Velasquez, Rubens, Goya, and all the art seized by the Spanish state during the Mendizábal confiscations.

Cruzada Villaamil was born in Alicante to a wealthy family and first became a diplomat in Vienna and Berlin before returning to Madrid in 1855 and settling in the Lope de Vega street where he received visitors to practise fencing and discuss art.

He began publishing articles on Spanish art and in December 1862 Cruzada Villaamil was appointed deputy director of the Museo de la Trinidad. He wrote the first catalog raisonné of that institution and sorted the collection by region of origin. He contributed new biographical information on the artist Velázquez, but also of Rubens' stays at the Spanish court in 1603 and 1628–1629, and of Goya's work as a painter of cartoons for tapestries.

Villaamil died in Madrid.

== Works ==
- Catálogo Museo de la Trinidad, collection catalog, 1865
- El Arte en España, magazine published 1862-1870
- Los tapices de Goya, art catalog, 1870
- Rubens, diplomático español; sus viajes á España y noticia de sus cuadros, segun los inventarios de las casas reales de Austria y de Borbon, 1874
