= Boys Playing Soldiers =

Painting by Francisco de Goya

- Muchachos jugando a soldados (Spanish)
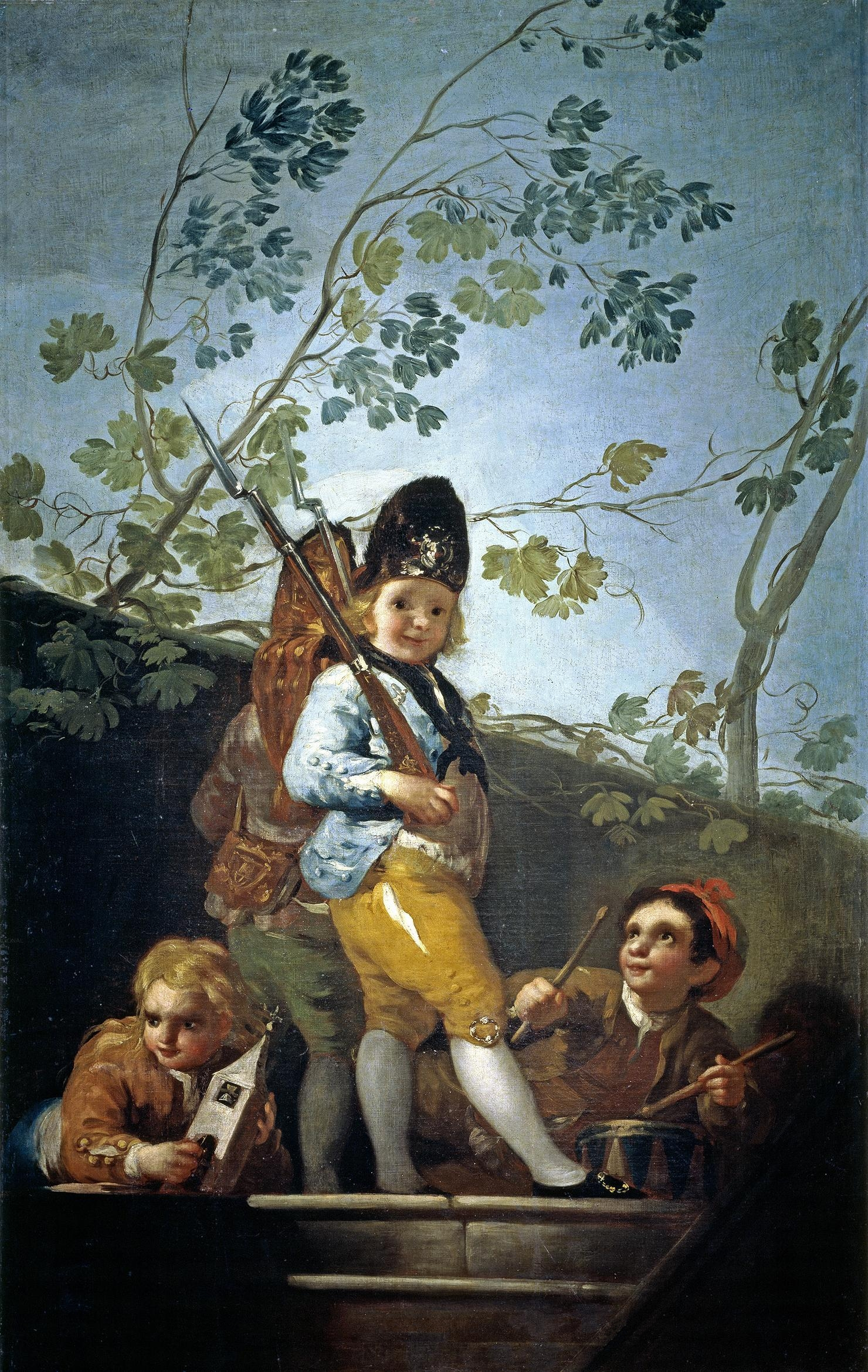
- Artist: Francisco Goya
- Year: 1778–79
- Type: Oil on canvas
- Dimensions: 146 cm × 94 cm (57 in × 37 in)
- Location: Museo del Prado; Madrid

Boys Playing Soldiers is a 1778–79 tapestry cartoon by Francisco of Goya conceived for the bedroom of the Princes of Asturias in the Royal Palace of El Pardo. It is presently exhibited in the Museo del Prado. A sketch of the artwork is kept nowadays in the Yanduri Collection of Seville.

== Description ==
Two boys on foot carry rifles, whereas one plays a drum and the last holds a miniature bell tower. The lower perspective of the picture enhances the presence of the characters standing on top of a rise. The composition has a martial character, funny and childish. Close up, a cheerful little soldier looks at the onlooker in what has been considered one of the major achievements attained by the artist. Goya often depicts children of different social types, like majos, aristocrats, and others. The yellowish and bluish colour of the work provides a cheerful atmosphere, further emphasized by the faces of the boys. The brushstroke and the illumination render this work a forerunner of impressionism, like other pictures of Goya.

It was possibly hanging on top of a door. Similar pictures embellishing the royal chambers were devoted to infant individuals like Niños del carretón, Muchachos cogiendo fruta or Niños inflando una vejiga. This painting shows a similar chromatic range to that of El cacharrero, both decorating the same wall. The upholsterer undertook a series of alterations in the composition in order to adapt it to the tastes prevailing during the period.

== See also ==
- List of works by Francisco Goya
