= Still Life of a Lamb's Head and Flanks =

Painting by Francisco de Goya

Still-Life: A Butcher's Counter
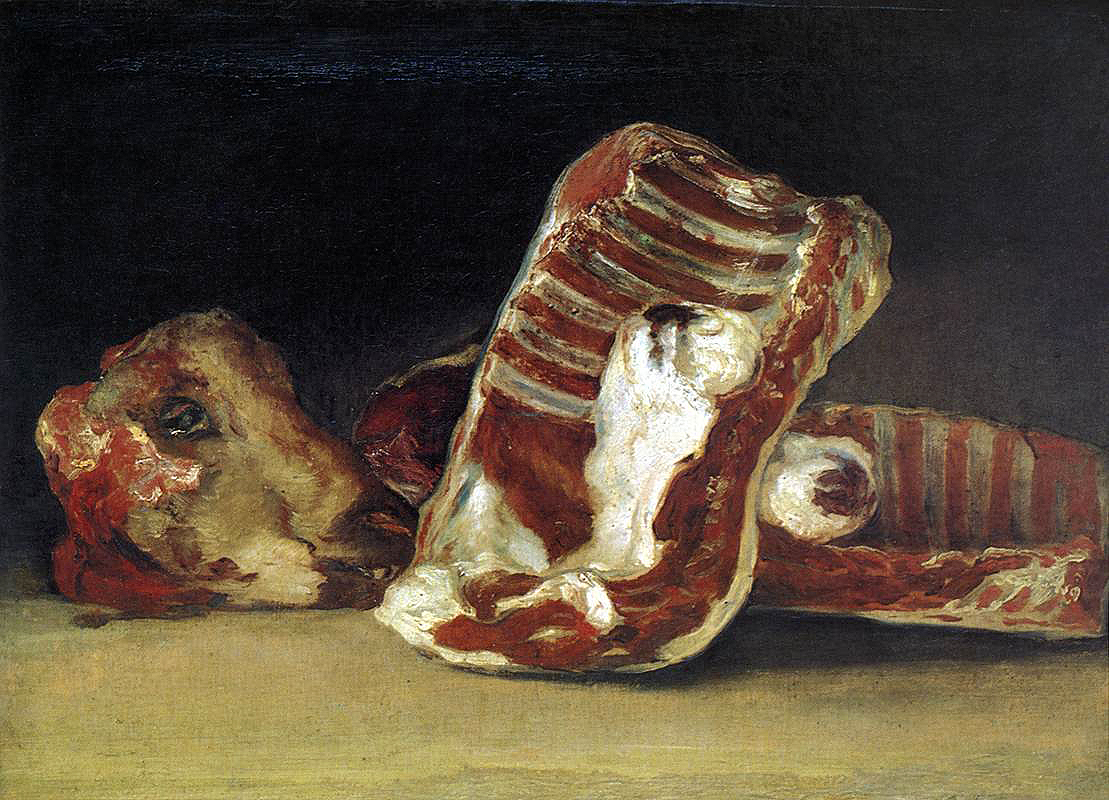
- Artist: Francisco Goya
- Year: c. 1808–1812
- Medium: oil paint, canvas
- Dimensions: 45 cm (18 in) × 62 cm (24 in)
- Location: Louvre, Paris
- Accession: RF 1937 120

Still Life of a Lamb's Head and Flanks (Spanish: Bodegón con costillas, lomo y cabeza de cordero) or A Butcher's Counter (Spanish: Trozos de Carnero) is an still-life oil painting by Francisco Goya, from c. 1808–1812. It has been in the collection of the Louvre, in Paris, since 1909.

The painting is one of a series of 12 still lifes of dead or butchered animals that Goya painted during Spain's war with Napoleon. Made at the same time as the artist's The Disasters of War, the paintings are noted for their departure from traditional still lifes. Scholars suggest that the paintings from this series evoke the death and violence Spain witnessed at that time.

== See also ==
- List of works by Francisco Goya
- Dead Turkey

== External sources ==
- Media related to A Butcher's Counter, Goya (Louvre RF 1937-120) at Wikimedia Commons
