= Portrait of Juan Antonio Cuervo =

Painting by Francisco Goya

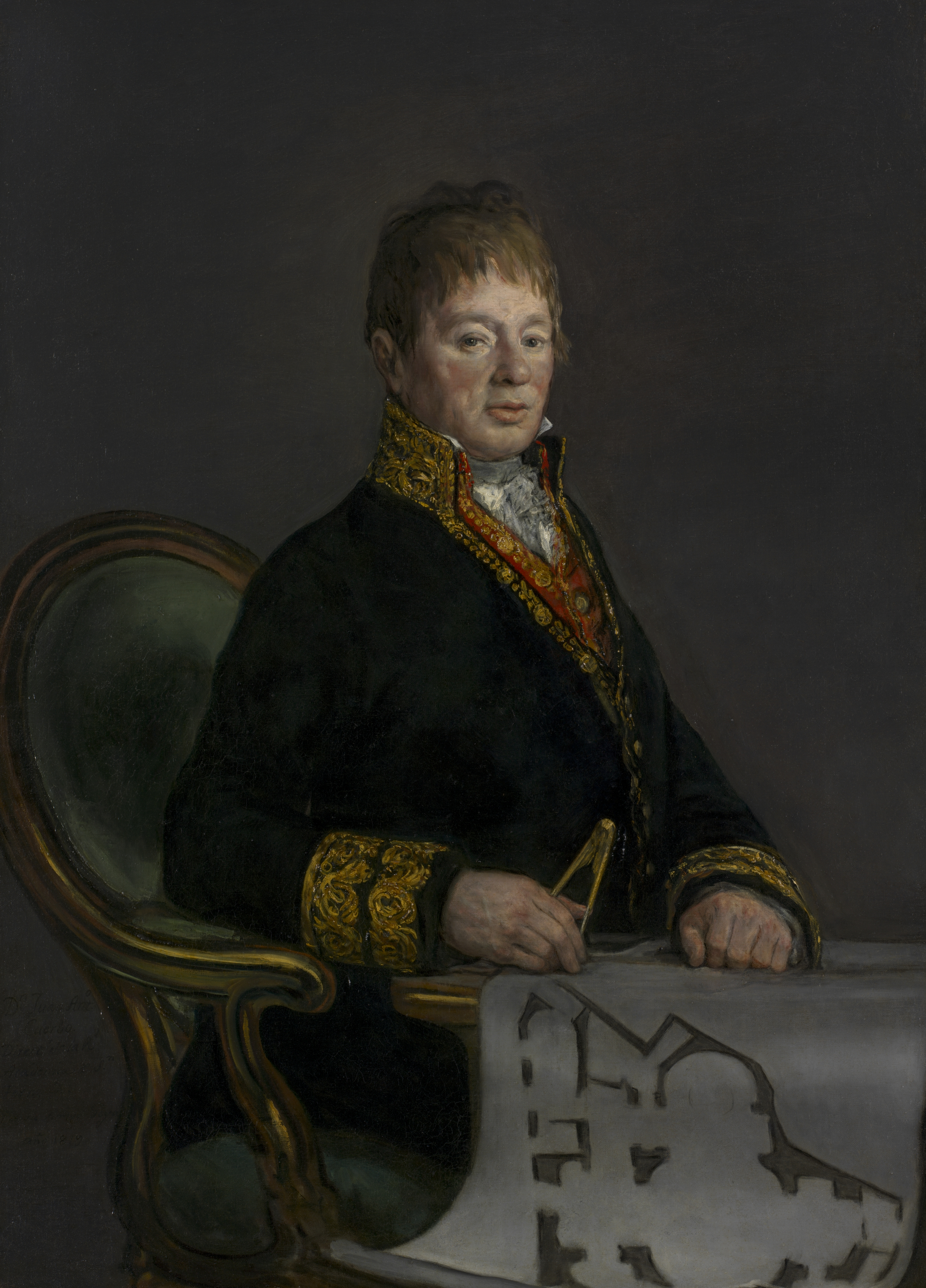
- Artist: Francisco Goya
- Year: 1819
- Type: Oil on canvas, portrait
- Dimensions: 120 cm × 87 cm (47 in × 34 in)
- Location: Cleveland Museum of Art, Cleveland

Portrait of Juan Antonio Cuervo is an 1819 portrait painting by the Spanish artist Francisco Goya depicting Juan Antonio Cuervo. Cuervo, an architect, was the director of the Spanish Royal Academy and is dressed in the academic uniform of his position with gold braid. He is shown with his plans for the renovation of the Church of Santiago in Madrid.

It was likely exhibited at the Royal Academy, the final time he participated in the exhibition. It was later hailed by Narciso Sentenach as "one of the most brilliant examples of the mastery of the artist". Today it is in the collection of the Cleveland Museum of Art, having been acquired in 1943.

== See also ==
- List of works by Francisco Goya

== Bibliography ==
- Aymar, Gordon Christian. The Art of Portrait Painting: Portraits Through the Centuries as Seen Through the Eyes of a Practicing Portrait Painter. Chilton Book Company, 1967.
- Brown, Jonathan & Galassi, Susan Grace. Goya's Last Works. Frick Collection, 2006.
- Tomlinson, Janis. Goya: A Portrait of the Artist. Princeton University Press, 2022.
