= Portrait of Ferdinand VII =

Painting by Francisco Goya

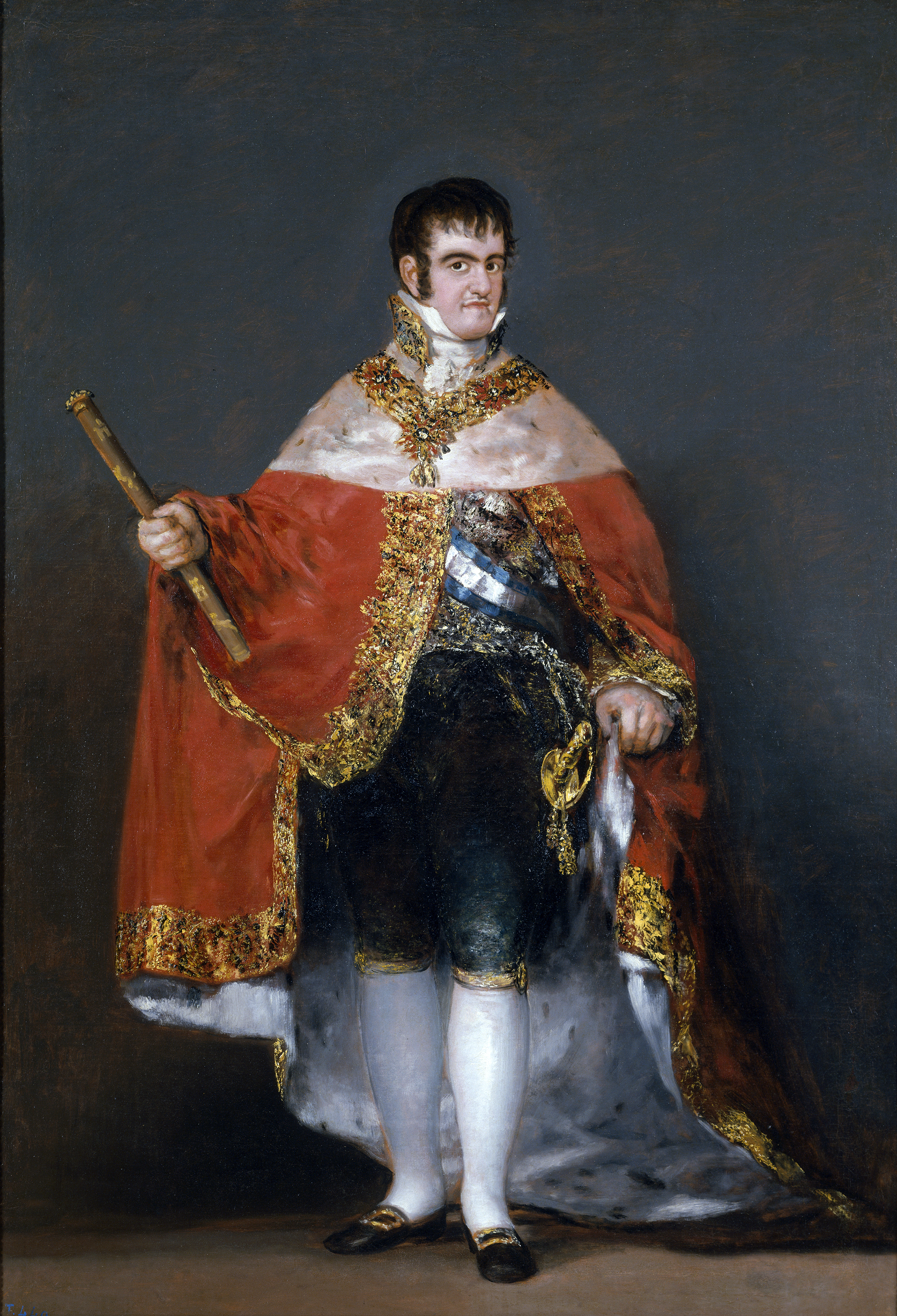
- Artist: Francisco Goya
- Year: 1814–1815
- Type: Oil on canvas, portrait
- Dimensions: 208 cm × 142.5 cm (82 in × 56.1 in)
- Location: Museo del Prado, Madrid

Portrait of Ferdinand VII is an 1815 portrait painting by Francisco Goya depicting Ferdinand VII of Spain. It depicts the King wearing his robes of state.

From 1808 to 1813 Ferdinand had been a prisoner of the French Empire, held at the Château de Valençay after being deposed in favour of Napoleon's brother Joseph Bonaparte. A popular guerilla insurgency and the intervention of British forces under Lord Wellington eventually drove the French occupiers out during the Peninsular War. In late 1813 Ferdinand was released and was restored to the Spanish throne in Madrid.

While popular with the rural communities that made up the majority of the population, Ferdinand was soon in dispute with the Liberals who had issued the Constitution of 1812. The previous year Goya painted Ferdinand in the uniform of a Captain General of the Spanish Army. Today the work is in the collection of the Prado in Madrid.

== See also ==
- List of works by Francisco Goya

== Bibliography ==
- Canton, Francisco Javier Sánchez. Guide to the Prado Museum. Editorial Peninsular, 1967.
- Delorme, Eleanor P. Josephine: Napoleon's Incomparable Empress. Harry N. Abrams, 2002.
- Nafziger, George F. Historical Dictionary of the Napoleonic Era. Scarecrow Press, 11 Dec 2001.
