= Self-Portrait at an Easel =

Painting by Francisco de Goya

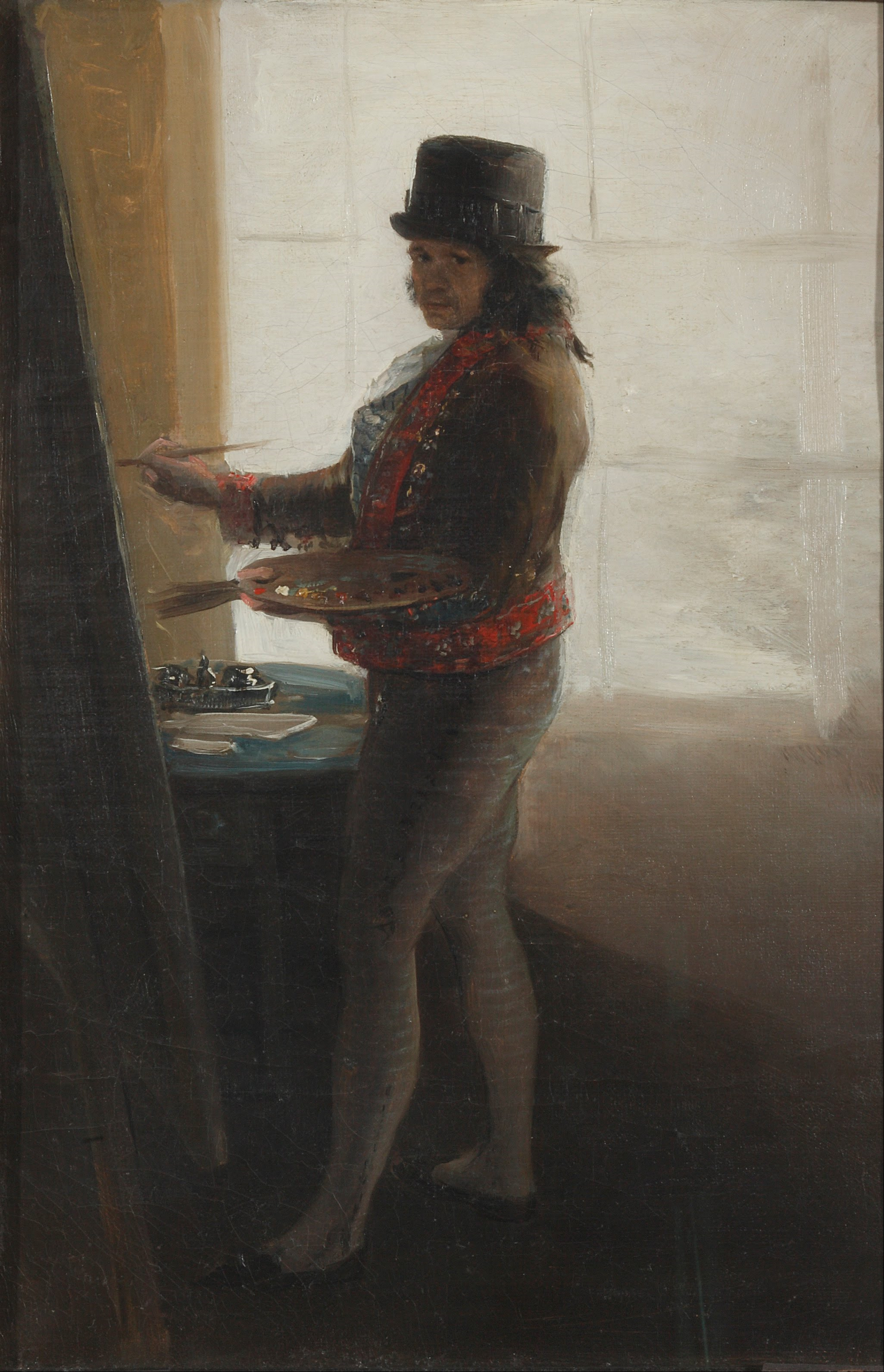
- Artist: Francisco Goya
- Year: 1790–1795
- Medium: Oil on canvas
- Dimensions: 42 cm × 28 cm (17 in × 11 in)
- Location: Real Academia de Bellas Artes de San Fernando, Madrid

Self-Portrait at an Easel or Self-Portrait in the Studio is a 1790–1795 cabinet-format portrait by Francisco de Goya, now in the Real Academia de Bellas Artes de San Fernando.

== Description ==
This self-portrait is a clear and articulate commentary on the Romantic artist.

Goya finds it unnecessary to look at the canvas while he paints; inspiration alone guides his brush. Goya stands aside, and is indeed enveloped by, a grandly lit window like the one that serves as a metaphor for Christ's holiness in Leonardo da Vinci's Last Supper, and moreover, one through which the natural world is decidedly not visible. The art historian, John J. Ciofalo, writes: "with thick coats of radiant white paint, Goya has literally and figuratively brushed "the outside world" out of existence or, at a minimum, demoted it to irrelevance."

To underscore this, Goya has no need, and yet is wearing his night painting hat, affixed with a "halo" of candles to crown his Romantic imagination. In short, as Ciofalo writes, "that is not daylight coming in the window...the radiance is coming from inside the studio, from inside the Romantic artist's mind."

== See also ==
- List of works by Francisco Goya

== Bibliography ==
- Ciofalo, John J. (2001). The Self-Portraits of Francisco Goya. Cambridge: Cambridge University Press. pp. 5–6. ISBN 0-521-77136-6. OCLC 43561897.
