= Assault of Thieves =

c. 1794 painting by Francisco de Goya

- Asalto de ladrones (Spanish)
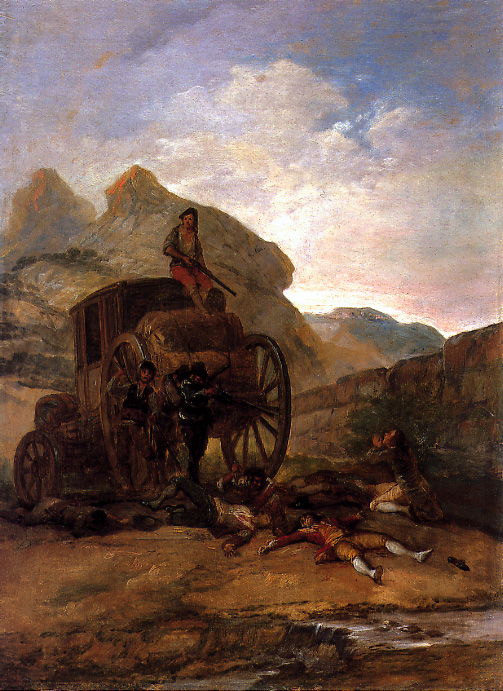
- Artist: Francisco de Goya
- Year: 1793–1794
- Medium: Oil painting
- Movement: Romanticism
- Dimensions: 42 cm × 31 cm (17 in × 12 in)
- Owner: Colección Juan Abelló

Assault of Thieves (Spanish: Asalto de ladrones) is an oil painting made by the Spanish artist Francisco de Goya between 1793 and 1794. It is part of a private collection owned by Juan Abelló.

== See also ==
- List of works by Francisco Goya

== Bibliography ==
- Bozal, Valeriano (2005). Francisco Goya, vida y obra. Vol. 2. Madrid: Tf. ISBN 978-84-96209-39-8.
- D'ors Führer, Carlos; Morales Marín, Carlos (1990). Los genios de la pintura: Francisco de Goya. Madrid: Sarpe. ISBN 978-84-7700-100-3.
- Glendinning, Nigel (1993). "Francisco de Goya". Cuadernos de Historia. El arte y sus creadores. 30. Madrid.
