= The Rape of Europa (Goya) =

Painting by Francisco Goya

- El rapto de Europa (Spanish)
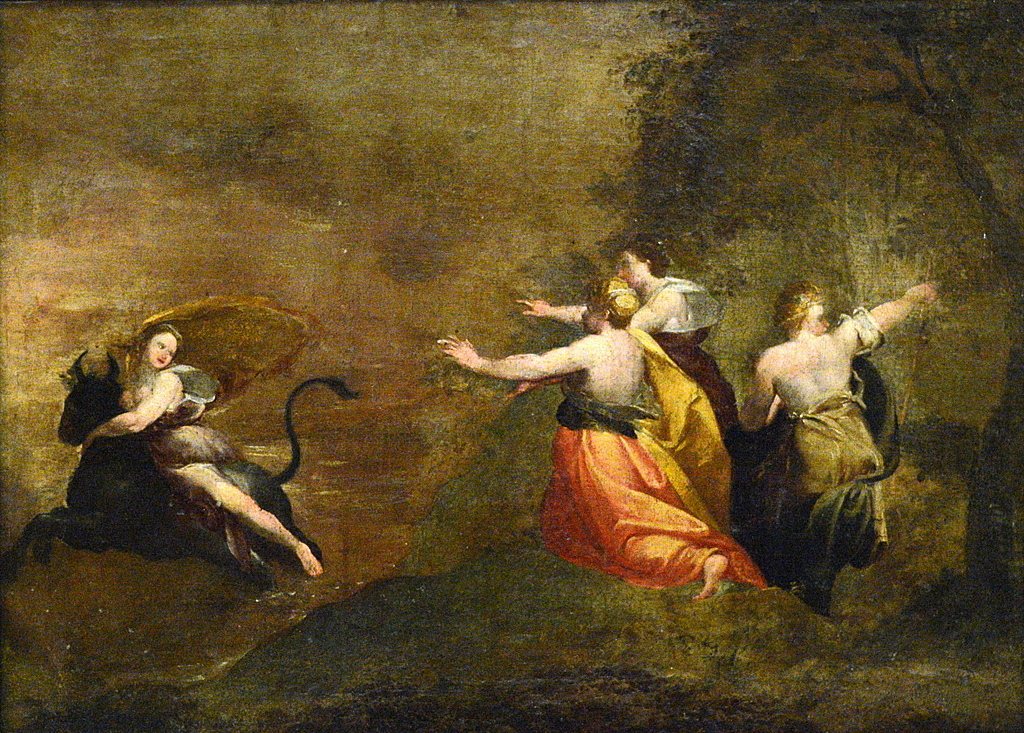
- Artist: Francisco Goya(1746-1828)
- Year: 1772
- Dimensions: 47 cm × 68 cm (19 in × 27 in)
- Location: Private Collection

The Rape of Europa (Spanish: El rapto de Europa) is a 1772 painting created by Spanish painter and printmaker Francisco José de Goya y Lucientes (1746–1828) depicting Europa's abduction by the Greek god Zeus in the form of a bull. The classical theme from Greek mythology has also been painted by numerous Old Masters.

== See also ==
- Depictions of Europa in art and literature
- List of works by Francisco Goya
