= Consecration of Aloysius Gonzaga as Patron Saint of Youth =

Painting by Francisco de Goya

- Consagración de San Luis Gonzaga como patrono de la juventud (Spanish)
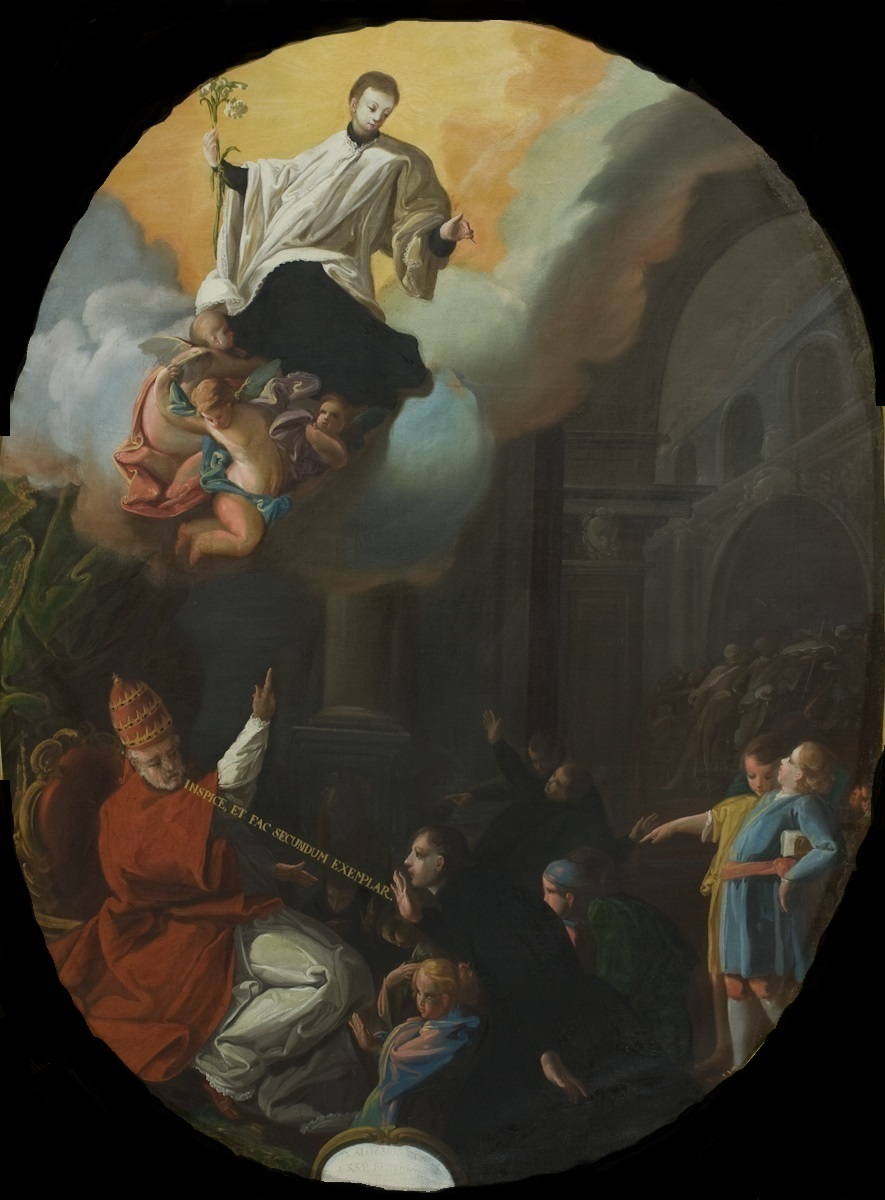
- Artist: Francisco Goya
- Year: c. 1763
- Medium: Oil on canvas
- Dimensions: 127 cm × 88 cm (50 in × 35 in)
- Location: Zaragoza Museum; Saragossa

Consecration of Aloysius Gonzaga as Patron Saint of Youth is an oil painting by Francisco de Goya, created c. 1763, when Goya was around 17 years old. It is now owned by the town of Jaraba, but is stored inside the Zaragoza Museum in Zaragoza

== History ==
It resulted from a commission by the Jesuit church of Santa María del Pilar de Calatayud, now known as San Juan el Real. After the Jesuits were expelled from Spain in 1767, the painting went to the sanctuary of the Virgin of Jaraba, where it was rediscovered in 1985.

== Description ==
It shows saint Aloysius Gonzaga being consecrated as the patron saint of young people by pope Benedict XIII, who taught young Italians to take the saint as their example, as indicated by the Latin words on the pope's speech-bubble "Inspice, FAC ET secundum EXEMPLAR" (Look and follow his example). The pope points at the saint, who appears in glory in Jesuit robes among angels and bearing a bouquet of lilies, alluding to his purity.

Goya was probably influenced by his tutor Joseph Luzán. The painting is in line with the Italian rococo school and can be seen to be youthful in the lack of skill in some of the figure drawing.

== See also ==
- List of works by Francisco Goya
