= Portrait of Don Ramón Satué =

Painting by Francisco Goya

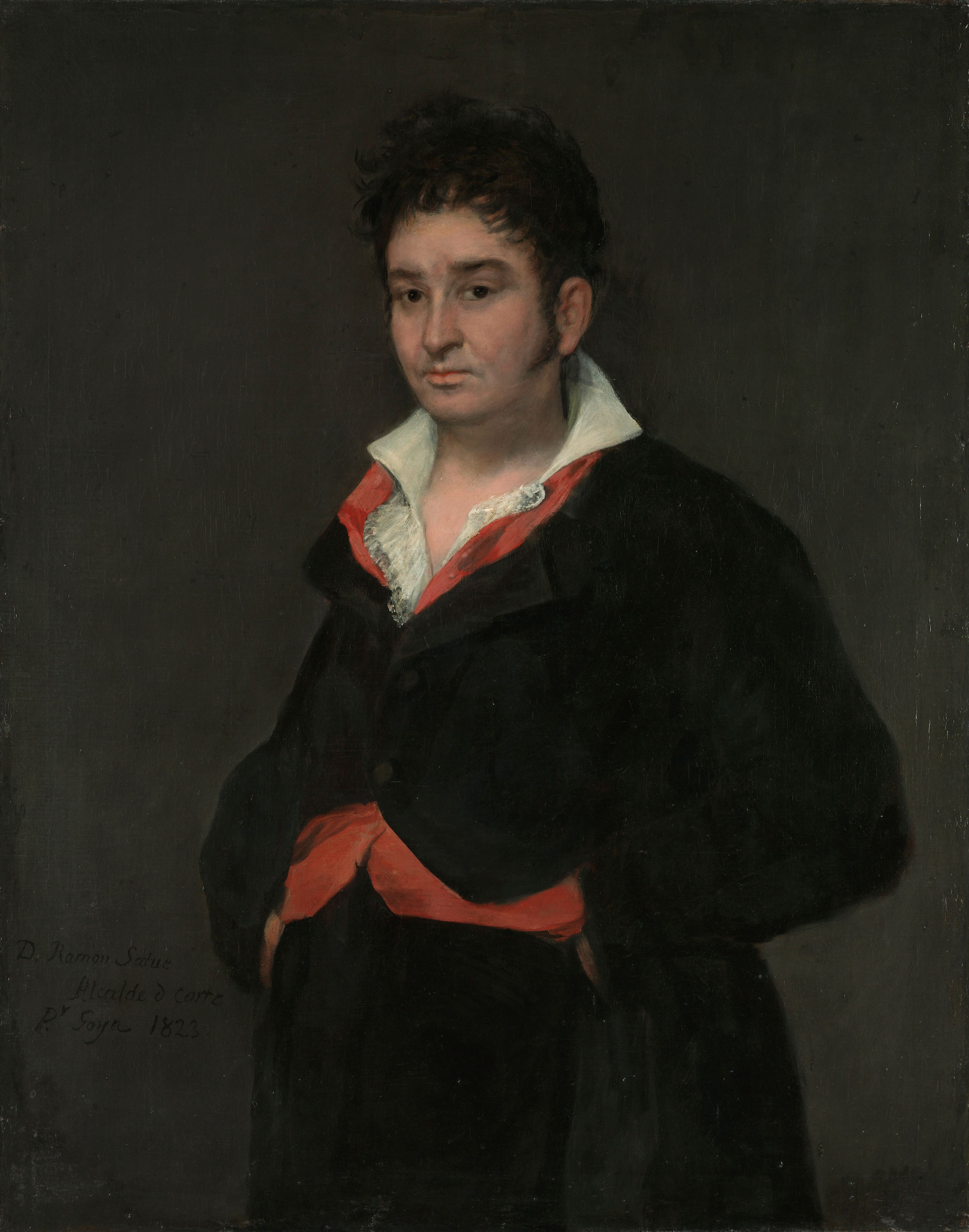
- Artist: Francisco Goya
- Year: 1823
- Medium: canvas, oil paint
- Dimensions: 104 cm (41 in) × 81.3 cm (32.0 in)
- Location: Rijksmuseum, Netherlands
- Accession no.: SK-A-2963

Portrait of Don Ramón Satué is an 1823 oil on panel painting by the Spanish artist Francisco de Goya in the collection of the Rijksmuseum, in Amsterdam. It is the only publicly held Goya in the Netherlands.

== Painting ==
Judge Ramón Satué, member of the court of Madrid named "Sala de Alcaldes de Corte per la Audiencia Territorial" is standing, half-length, looking towards the left and turned to look at the viewer. He wears a black suit with a red vest and white shirt open casually at the neck. He is disheveled and his hands rest in his trouser pockets.

== Provenance ==
This painting was purchased in 1922 by the Vereniging Rembrandt and gifted to the Rijksmuseum, where it has been included in all Highlights of the Rijksmuseum catalogs since. It originally belonged to the collection of the Marquis de Heredia of Madrid who sold it through Benito Garriga of the same city by auction in 1890 at the Hôtel Drouot in Paris. It sold for 1,500 francs (lot no. 3). The same auction house sold it again in 1902 (lot no. 21) for 9,510 francs by Dr. Joachim Carvalho for his property Château de Villandry, France.

== Overpainted hidden portrait ==
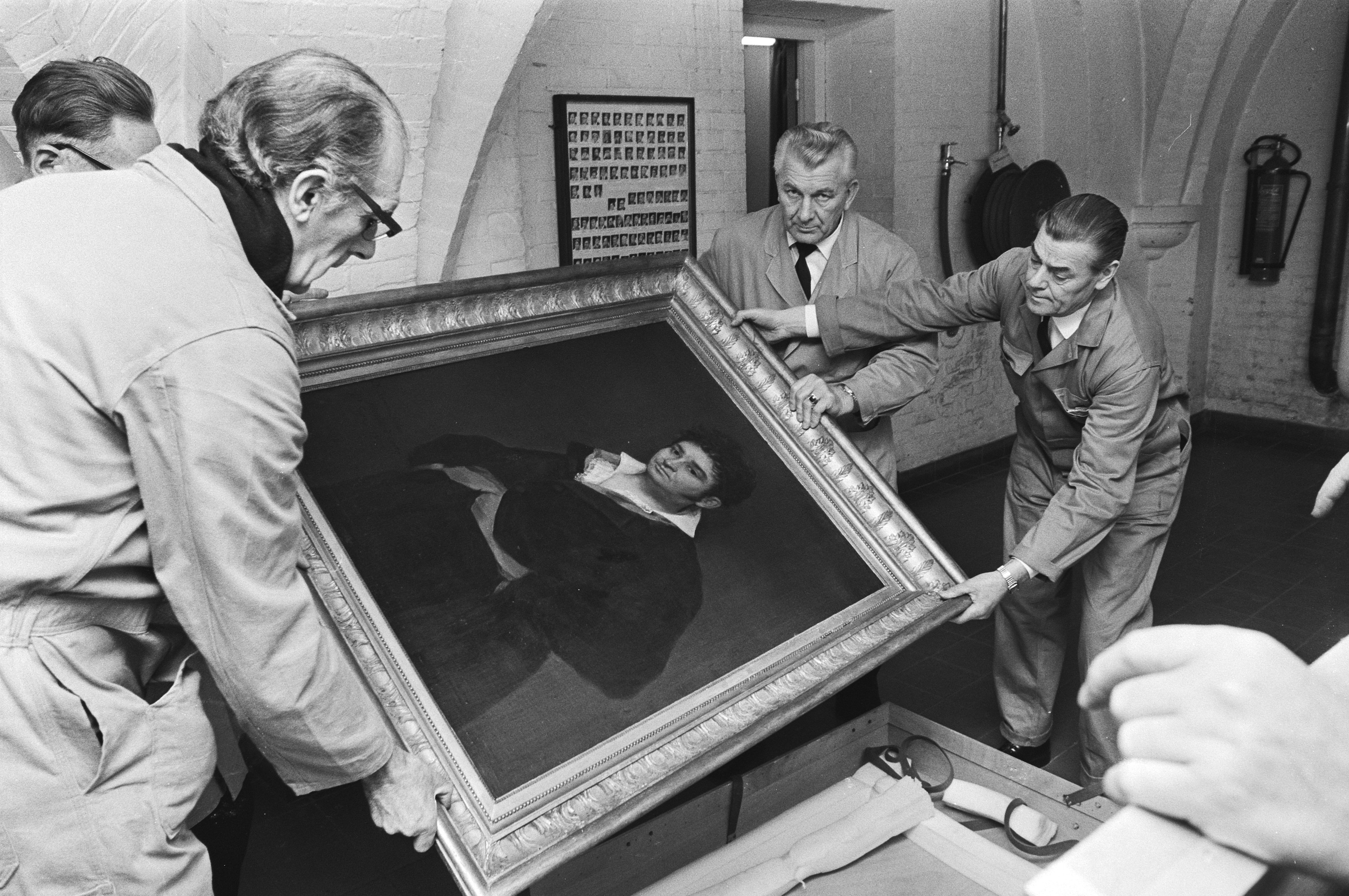
Painting returning to the Rijksmuseum after being lent out in 1970

While experts had already suspected that there was a different composition under this portrait of Judge Satué, the researchers Joris Dik and Koen Janssens used X-ray technology they developed to examine this painting and discovered it does indeed show another portrait in the dress of a senior French official with medals on his chest: a general or possibly even the king of Spain, Joseph Bonaparte. That underpainting would have been painted around 1810 during the Peninsular War. According to Joris Dik, "Goya, we know, managed to survive both political situations – the transfer of Spain to the French and back to Spain … After 1820, [such a portrait] could have been dangerous. That's when we believe the portrait was overpainted with the figure we can see now, as that painting dates from 1823."

== See also ==
- List of works by Francisco Goya
