= The Holy Family with Saint Joachim and Saint Anne Before the Eternal Glory =

Painting by Francisco de Goya

- Sagrada Familia con San Joaquín y Santa Ana ante el Eterno en gloria (Spanish)
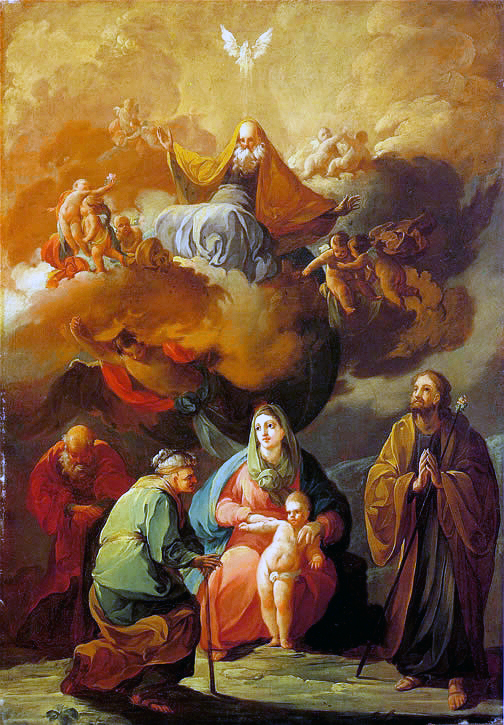
- Artist: Francisco Goya
- Year: c. 1769
- Medium: Oil on canvas
- Dimensions: 79 cm × 55 cm (31 in × 22 in)
- Location: Marquis de las Palmas Private Collection; Jerez de la Frontera

The Holy Family with Saint Joachim and Saint Anne Before the Eternal Glory or The Three Generations is an oil painting on canvas executed in 1769 by the Spanish artist Francisco Goya. It is an early work by the artist, depicting the Holy Family, with the Virgin Mary's parents Saint Anne and Saint Joachim and God the Father and the Holy Spirit. The painting is now in the Marquis de las Palmas collection in Jerez de la Frontera.

== See also ==
- List of works by Francisco Goya
