= Portrait of Ferdinand Guillemardet =

Painting by Francisco de Goya

Ferdinand Guillemardet
- Portrait of Ferdinand Guillemardet
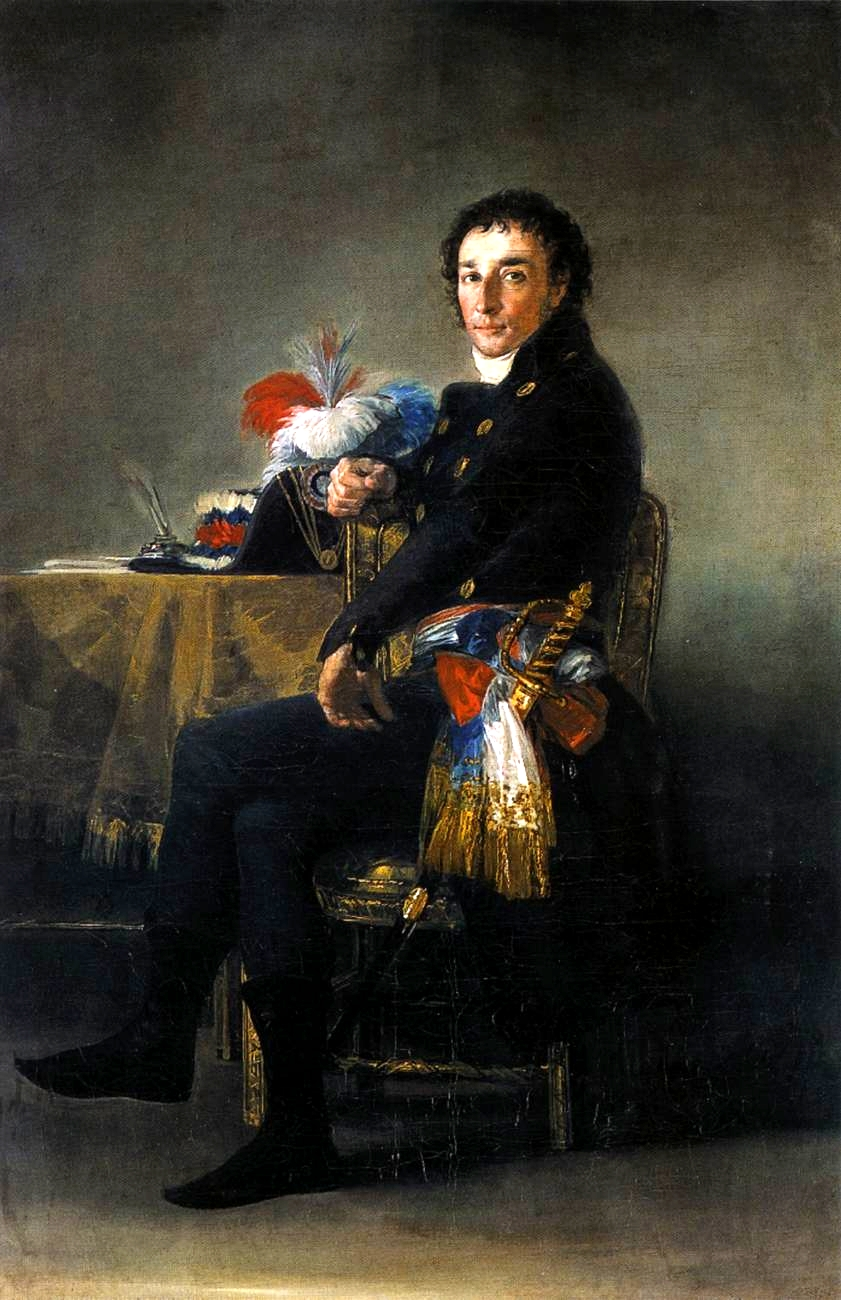
- Artist: Francisco Goya
- Year: 1798–1799
- Medium: oil paint, canvas
- Dimensions: 186 cm (73 in) × 124 cm (49 in)
- Location: Louvre, Room 719
- Owner: French State

Portrait of Ferdinand Guillemardet is an oil painting by Francisco Goya, from 1798–1799. It depicts Ferdinand Guillemardet (1765–1809), the French ambassador to Spain between 1798 and 1800. It is held in the Louvre, in Paris.

== Description ==
Guillemardet was a deputy of the Convention and was known for issuing an edict to transform Church buildings into civil meeting centres. In the painting, he is depicted sitting with his body in profile and his face facing the spectator, with an intelligent gaze, and his legs crossed in a relaxed attitude.

The portrait presents an energetic man and a representative of the powerful neighbouring nation. Although the pose seems natural, it is actually very well studied, since Goya wanted to distance itself from the somewhat more rigid postures of his other subjects. It was one of his favourite paintings, according to the painter himself.

The colours of the French Republic (blue, red and white) stand out in their vivid colours on the sash that Guillemardet has tied around his waist as well as on the cockade and feathers of his bicorn hat placed on the table behind him, in contrast with the soft gold of the table and chair. The subject personifies the power of the French Republic, sure of itself. Guillemardet is portrayed as being totally confident in the power of the young Republic that he represents. Goya uses chromaticism with great skill, based on subtle nuances and reflections in the bluish blacks that dominate the painting.

The purpose for this painting is not known. It is possible that Guillemardet was encouraged to be portrayed by the King's Chamber Painter by the ministers Mariano Luis de Urquijo or Gaspar Melchor de Jovellanos, more friendly with France.

== Provenance ==
The portrait was exhibited at the Real Academia de Bellas Artes de San Fernando in July 1799. Its subject took it to France and it was later given to the Louvre (where it now hangs) by Guillemardet's son Félix, a friend of Eugène Delacroix.

== See also ==
- List of works by Francisco Goya
