= Tío Paquete =

Painting by Francisco de Goya

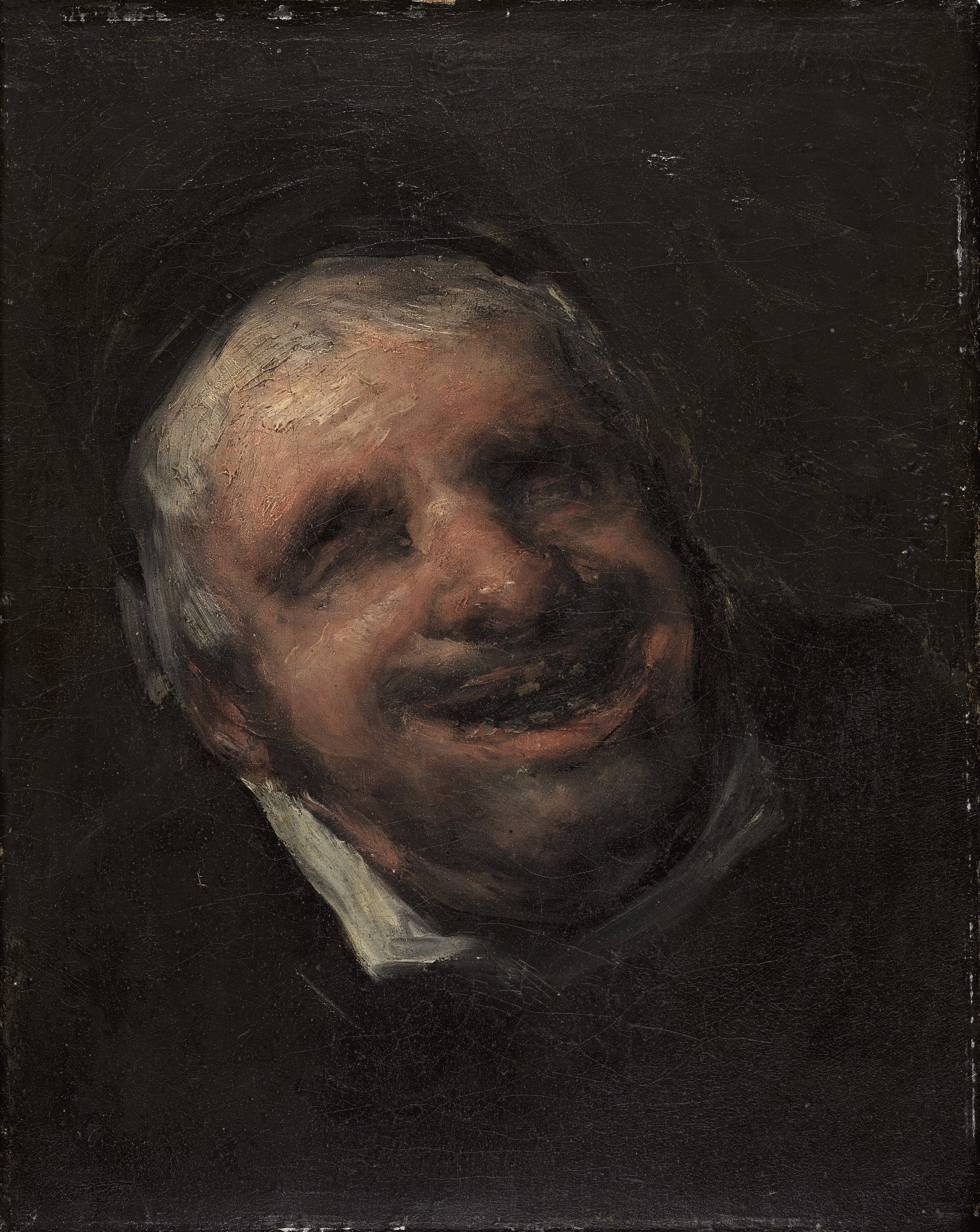
- Artist: Francisco Goya
- Year: c. 1819–1820
- Medium: Oil on canvas
- Dimensions: 39.1 cm × 31.1 cm (15.4 in × 12.2 in)
- Location: Thyssen-Bornemisza Museum, Madrid

Tío Paquete is an oil painting by the Spanish painter Francisco Goya, from c. 1819–1820. It is held in the Thyssen-Bornemisza Museum, in Madrid.

== History and description ==
Tío Paquete was a contemporary figure, an old blind beggar well known to Madrileños in the early 19th century. He would sit on the steps of the church of San Felipe el Real and beg, sing and play the guitar. Goya, passionate about the grotesqueness of everyday life, was inspired by him and immortalized his distorted features in a portrait. The viewer's attention is focused on the round face of the beggar that emerges from the dark background and occupies almost the entire canvas. Goya portrays the character's disability with strict realism but avoiding caricature. The beggar has sunken, closed eyes, a broad nose and open mouth, almost toothless, but laughing broadly. The portrait combines the drama of blindness with the comical temperament of the beggar, and at the same time has a strong Expressionist message, anticipating this movement by a hundred years.

In technical terms, the painting is similar to Goya's series of Black Paintings: the colors are dark and the paint is applied thickly using the impasto technique. It is particularly similar to the painting Man Mocked by Two Women in this series. The portrait is dated to the same period as the Black Paintings.

It is known from written sources that the portrait had the inscription El Célebre Ciego Fijo on the back, which disappeared after the painting was aligned and framed after 1887. The painting belonged to Goya's grandson, Mariano, and later passed to the collection of the Count of Doña Marina. The next owner was the Marqués de Heredia. Since 1935 the work has belonged to the Thyssen-Bornemisza collection.

== See also ==
- List of works by Francisco Goya
