= List of works by Francisco Goya =

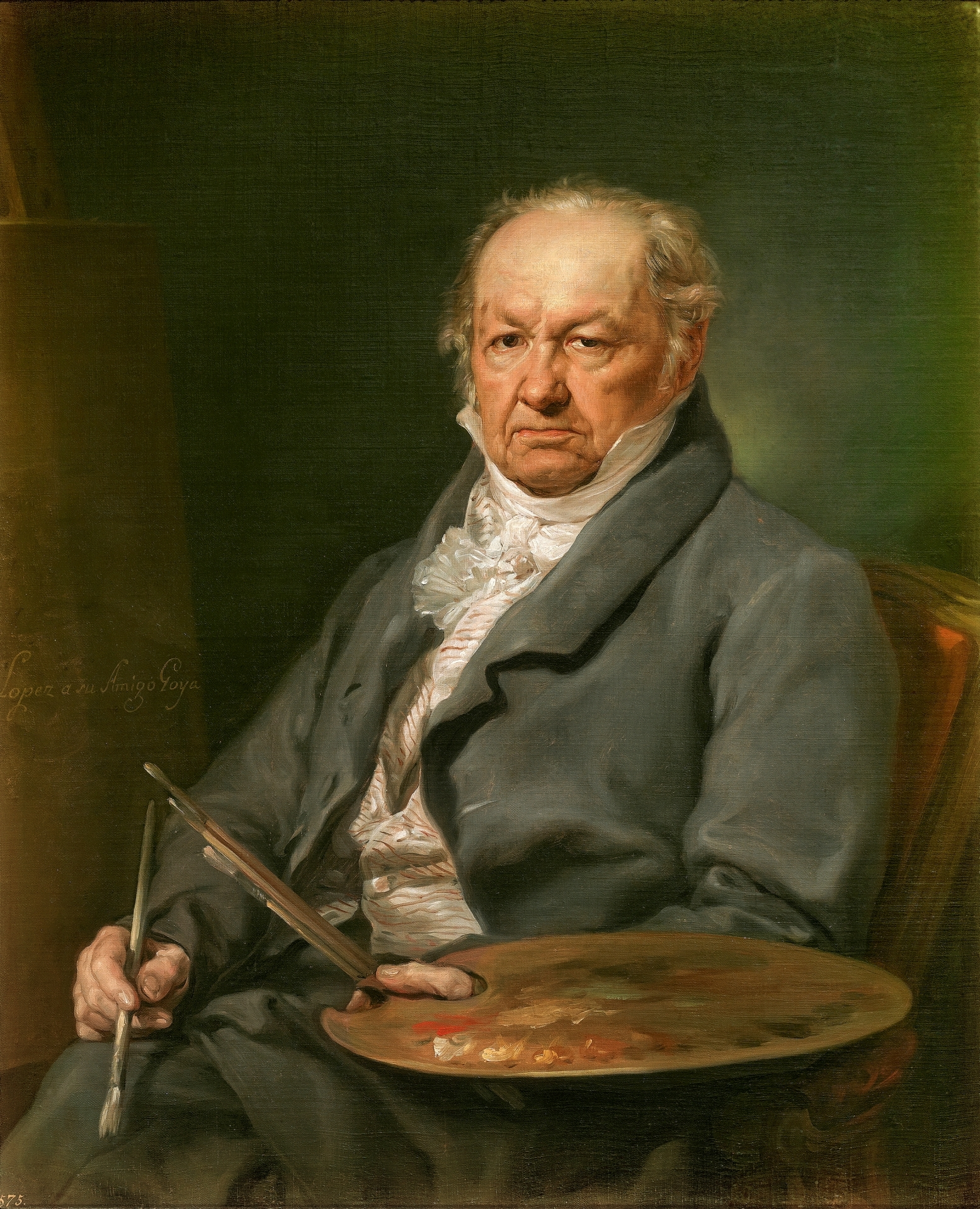
Portrait of Goya by Vicente López Portaña, c. 1826. Museo del Prado, Madrid

Francisco José de Goya y Lucientes (1746–1828) was a Spanish artist, now viewed as one of the leaders of the artistic movement Romanticism. He produced around 700 paintings, 280 prints, and several thousand drawings.

Goya's early career as a painter in the court of Charles III is marked by portraits of the Spanish aristocracy and tapestry cartoons in a Rococo style. Continuing to produce official portraits and paintings for the courts of Charles IV and Ferdinand VII, Goya's middle period is also notable for print series that satirize the human condition and show the brutalities of war.

Towards the end of his life, Goya created the enigmatic Black Paintings, applying oil paint directly onto the plaster walls of his house on the outskirts of Madrid.

== Attribution ==
Due to the demand for Goya's works since the 19th century, there is a large number of works falsely attributed to the artist in museums around the world and in private collections. Following the interpretation of Goya made by the French Romantics (later extended to Spain and the rest of the world), many 19th century painters such as Leonardo Alenza or Eugenio Lucas Velázquez produced works of low quality that they deliberately passed off as “Goyas” imitating his later style, emphasizing his grotesque and phantasmagoric facet, and using a loose brushstroke and blurred figures. Other attributions are more delicate to distinguish, some being due to the hand of Goya's contemporary Agustín Esteve.

Among the most relevant exhibitions are the retrospective exhibition Goya en la Beyeler Foundation in 2020-2021, and Goya. Drawings: "Only my Strength of Will Remains" at the Museo del Prado in 2019, which celebrated the 200th anniversary of the museum's creation.

== Paintings (1763–1774) ==
Image Title	Date	Current location	Size (in cm's)
Consecration of Aloysius Gonzaga as patron saint of youth	1763	Zaragoza Museum	127 x 88
Assumption of the Virgin and Saint Íñigo (in Spanish)	1763	San Juan el Real, Calatayud	230 x 70
Saint Christopher (in Polish)	1767	Zaragoza Museum	140 x 100
Apparition of the Virgin of the Pillar to Saint James and his Saragossan disciples (in Spanish)	1769	Collection of Pascual de Quinto, Zaragoza	79 x 55
Apparition of the Virgin of the Pillar to Saint James and his Saragossan disciples (sketch)	c. 1782	Private collection	47 x 33
The Holy Family with Saint Joachim and Saint Anne before the Eternal Glory	1769	Collection of Marquess de las Palmas, Jerez de la Frontera	79 x 55
Hannibal the conqueror	1770	Museo del Prado, Madrid	87 x 131.5
Hannibal the conqueror (sketch I)	1770	Zaragoza Museum	30.5 x 38.5
Victorious Hannibal views Italy from the Alps for the first time (sketch II)	1770	Private collection	31.1 x 40.6
The Sacrifice to Vesta (in Polish)	1771	Collection of Felix Palacios Remondo, Zaragoza	32.5 x 24
The Sacrifice to Pan (in French)	1771	Private collection	32.5 x 24
Venus and Adonis (in Spanish)	1771	Zaragoza Museum	23 x 12
Ecstasy of Saint Anthony the Great (in Polish)	1771	Private collection	47.2 x 38.8
The Death of St. Francis Xavier (in Polish)	1771 to 1774	Zaragoza Museum	56 x 41
Our Lady of the Pillar (in Spanish)	1771 to 1774	Zaragoza Museum	56 x 42
The Rape of Europa	1772	Private collection	47 x 68
The Adoration of the Name of God	1772	Basílica de Nuestra Señora del Pilar, Zaragoza	700 x 1500
The Adoration of the Name of God (sketch)	1772	Museo Camón Aznar, Zaragoza	75 x 152
Saint Barbara (in Spanish)	1772	Museo del Prado, Madrid	97.2 x 78.5
The dream of St. Joseph	1772	Zaragoza Museum	129 x 93
The burial of Christ (Note: attributed to Goya)	1772	Lázaro Galdiano Museum, Madrid	130 x 95
Virgin with child	1772 to 1773	Félix Palacios Collection, Zaragoza	58.3 x 83.7
Virgin with child and Saint Joseph	1772 to 1773	Private collection	
Devotees at the foot of the Cross	1772 to 1773	Private collection	131 x 90
Death of Saint Albert of Jerusalem	1772 to 1775	Private collection	35 x 60
Flight to Egypt	1772 to 1775	Private collection	35 x 60
Self portrait (in Polish)	1773	Museo Camón Aznar, Zaragoza	58 x 44
Portrait of a man with sombrero	1773 to 1775	Zaragoza Museum	31 x 42
Frescoes in the Cartuja de Aula Dei	1774	Charterhouse of Aula Dei	306 x 790
Piety	1774	Museum of Romanticism (Madrid)	83.5 x 58
Lot and his daughters	1774	Private collection	90 x 125
Sacrifice of Jephthah's daughter	1774	Colección Várez Fisa, Madrid	97 x 120

== Paintings (1775–1792) ==
see also: List of Francisco Goya's tapestry cartoons

Image Title	Date	Current location	Size (in cm's)
The Boar Hunt	1775	Royal Palace of Madrid	249 x 173
Dogs on a leash (in Spanish)	1775	Museo del Prado, Madrid	112 x 174
Hunting with a decoy (in Spanish)	1775	Museo del Prado, Madrid	112 x 179
The Quail Shoot (in Spanish)	1775	Museo del Prado, Madrid	290 x 226
Hunter loading his rifle (in Spanish)	1775	Museo del Prado, Madrid	289 x 90
A hunter with his dogs (in Spanish)	1775	Museo del Prado, Madrid	262 x 71
The fisherman with his rod (in Spanish)	1775	Museo del Prado, Madrid	289 x 110
Portrait of Matthias Allué (in Polish)	1775	Goya Museum, Castres	67 x 53
Francesco Sabatini (in Polish)	1775 to 1779	Meadows Museum, Dallas	82.9 x 62.2
Baptism of Christ	1775 to 1780	Private collection	45 x 39
The apostle James and his disciples worshiping the Virgin of Pilar	1775 to 1780	Private collection	107 x 80
Saint Ignacius of Loyola (in Spanish)	1775 to 1780	Private collection	85 x 57
Picnic on the banks of the Manzanares (in Spanish)	1776	Museo del Prado, Madrid	271 x 295
Dance on the bank of the Manzanares (in Spanish)	1776 to 1777	Museo del Prado, Madrid	275 x 298
The drinker (in Spanish)	1777	Museo del Prado, Madrid	107 x 151
The Parasol	1777	Museo del Prado, Madrid	104 x 152
The Road of Andalusia (in Spanish)	1777	Museo del Prado, Madrid	275 x 190
The fight at the Venta Nueva (in Spanish)	1777	Museo del Prado, Madrid	275 x 414
The Card Players	1777 to 1778	Museo del Prado, Madrid	270 x 167
The Card Players (sketch)	1777 to 1778	Private collection	87 x 58
The Kite (in Spanish)	1778	Museo del Prado, Madrid	269 x 285
Boys picking fruit (in Spanish)	1778	Museo del Prado, Madrid	119 x 122
Children inflating a bladder (in Spanish)	1778	Museo del Prado, Madrid	116 x 124
Children in a Chariot	1778	Museum of Art, Toledo	145.4 x 94
Aesop and Menippus	1778	Museo Camón Aznar, Zaragoza	
Blind Guitarist (in Spanish)	1778 to 1779	Museo del Prado, Madrid	260 x 311
The pottery vendor (in Spanish)	1778 to 1779	Museo del Prado, Madrid	259 x 220
The seller of acerola (in Spanish)	1778 to 1779	Museo del Prado, Madrid	259 x 100
Madrid fair (in Spanish)	1778 to 1779	Museo del Prado, Madrid	258 x 218
The soldier and the lady (in Spanish)	1778 to 1779	Museo del Prado, Madrid	259 x 100
Boys playing soldiers	1779	Museo del Prado, Madrid	146 x 94
Boys playing soldiers (sketch)	1775	Colección Yanduri, Seville	39 x 28
The Guitar Guy (in Spanish)	1779	Museo del Prado, Madrid	137 x 112
The Swing	1779	Museo del Prado, Madrid	260 x 165
The Game of Pelota with Rackets (in Spanish)	1779	Museo del Prado, Madrid	261 x 470
The medic	1779	Scottish National Gallery, Edinburgh	95.8 x 120.2
The tree boy (in Spanish)	1779 to 1780	Museo del Prado, Madrid	262 x 40
The boy with a bird (in Spanish)	1779 to 1780	Museo del Prado, Madrid	262 x 40
The Rendezvous (in Spanish)	1779 to 1780	Museo del Prado, Madrid	100 x 151
The tobacco guards (in Spanish)	1779 to 1780	Museo del Prado, Madrid	262 x 137
The washerwomen (in Spanish)	1779 to 1780	Museo del Prado, Madrid	218 x 166
The washerwomen (sketch)	1779 to 1780	Private collection	86.5 x 59
The lumberjacks (in Spanish)	1780	Museo del Prado, Madrid	141 x 114
Young Bulls Race	1780	Museo del Prado, Madrid	259 x 136
Christ Crucified	1780	Museo del Prado, Madrid	255 x 154
Ecstasy of Saint Anthony the Great (in Polish)	1780	Zaragoza Museum	67 x 46
Portrait of Martín Zapater	1780	Private collection	46.5 x 32
The Queen of Martyrs	1780 to 1781	Cathedral-Basilica of Our Lady of the Pillar, Zaragoza	
Apparition of the Virgin of Pilar (in Catalan)	1780 to 1782	Museu Nacional d'Art de Catalunya, Barcelona	46.7 x 33
Mariano Ferrer y Aulet (in Spanish)	1780 to 1783	Museu de Belles Arts de València	83.9 x 63.4
School Scene (in Spanish)	1780 to 1785	Zaragoza Museum	19.7 x 38.7
Antonio Veián y Monteagudo (in Polish)	1782	Huesca Museum	231 x 172
Children playing at soldiers	1782 to 1785	Private collection	29 x 42
Children playing at bullfighting	1782 to 1785	Private collection	29 x 42
The seesaw (in Spanish)	1782 to 1785	Museu de Belles Arts de València	30.9 x 43.9
The seesaw	1782 to 1785	Private collection	30.9 x 43.9
Children fighting over chestnuts	1782 to 1785	Private collection	30.5 x 43
Children playing leapfrog	1782 to 1785	Private collection	30.9 x 43.9
Children playing leapfrog	1782 to 1785	Museu de Belles Arts de València	30.9 x 43.9
Children looking for nests	1782 to 1785	Private collection	30.5 x 43
Gaspar Melchor de Jovellanos (in Polish)	1782 to 1785	Museum of Fine Arts of Asturias, Oviedo	205 x 116
José Moñino, 1st Count of Floridablanca and Francisco de Goya (in Spanish)	1783	Bank of Spain Building, Madrid	262 x 166
Doña Maria Teresa de Vallabriga (in Polish)	1783	Alte Pinakothek, Munich	151.2 x 97.8
Portrait of Doña María Teresa de Vallabriga y Rozas (in Polish)	1783	Private collection	67.2 x 50.4
Portrait of Maria Teresa de Vallabriga (profile) (in Polish)	1783	Museo del Prado, Madrid	48 x 39.6
Portrait of Infante Luis of Spain (in Polish)	1783	Private collection	48.5 x 39.4
María Teresa de Borbón y Vallabriga (in Spanish)	1783	National Gallery of Art, Washington D.C.	134.5 x 117.5
Luis María de Borbón y Vallabriga (in Polish)	1783	Zaragoza Museum	147 x 126
Equestrian portrait of María Teresa de Vallabriga (in Polish)	1783	Uffizi, Florence	82.5 x 61.7
José Moñino y Redondo, count de Floridablanca (in French)	1783	Museo del Prado, Madrid	196 x 116.5
Self-portrait	1783	Musée des Beaux-Arts d'Agen, Agen	86 x 60
Portrait of Camilo Goya (in Polish)	1783 to 1784	Museo Zuloaga, Zumaia	94 x 71
Miguel de Múzquiz y Goyeneche, count de Gausa (in Polish)	1783 to 1785	Bank of Spain Building, Madrid	200 x 114
The Family of the Infante Don Luis	1784	Magnani-Rocca Foundation, Mamiano	248 x 330
The Sermon of Saint Bernardino of Siena (in Spanish)	1784	Basilica of San Francisco el Grande, Madrid	480 x 300
The Sermon of Saint Bernardino of Siena (sketch I)	1781	Collection Tatiana Pérez de Guzmán el Bueno	62 x 31
The Sermon of Saint Bernardino of Siena (sketch II)	1781 to 1782	Collection Tatiana Pérez de Guzmán el Bueno	62 x 33
The Sermon of Saint Bernardino of Siena (sketch III or reduction of the original)	1782 to 1783	Unknown	140 x 80
Immaculate Conception (in Polish)	1784	Museo del Prado, Madrid	80 x 41
Portrait of Ventura Rodriguez (in Swedish)	1784	National Museum of Fine Arts, Stockholm	107 x 81
Hercules and Omphale (in Polish)	1784	Private collection	81 x 64.1
Portrait of Juan Agustín Ceán Bermúdez (in Spanish)	1785	Private collection	82 x 55
Admiral José de Mazarredo	1785	Lowe Art Museum, Miami	105 x 84
Admiral José de Mazarredo	1785	Private collection	103 x 83
The Annunciation	1785	Private collection	280 x 177
The Annunciation (sketch)	1785	Museum of Fine Arts, Boston	40.3 x 23.2
Portrait of the Duchess of Osuna (in Spanish)	1785	Private collection	104 x 80
Portrait of the Duke of Osuna (in Polish)	1785	Private collection	118 x 82
The Marquesa de Pontejos	c. 1786	National Gallery of Art, Washington, D.C.	210.3 x 127
Portrait of Francisco Bayeu (in Polish)	1786	Museu de Belles Arts de València	112.5 x 84.5
Charles III of Spain (in Spanish)	1786	Bank of Spain Building, Madrid	194 x 110
José de Toro y Zambrano (in Polish)	1786	Bank of Spain Building, Madrid	112 x 68
Picnic (in Spanish)	1786	Museo del Prado, Madrid	41.3 x 25.8
Harassed cat (in Spanish)	1786	Museo del Prado, Madrid	42 x 15.5
Boys with mastiffs (in Spanish)	1786 to 1787	Museo del Prado, Madrid	112 x 145
Boy on a ram (in Spanish)	1786 to 1787	Art Institute of Chicago	127.2 x 112.1
The Snowstorm	1786 to 1787	Museo del Prado, Madrid	275 x 293
The Snowstorm (sketch)	1786	Art Institute of Chicago	34.3 x 36.6
The Flower Girls (in Spanish)	1786 to 1787	Museo del Prado, Madrid	277 x 192
The Flower Girls (sketch)	1786 to 1787	Private collection	35 x 24
The injured mason (in Spanish)	1786 to 1787	Museo del Prado, Madrid	268 x 110
The Drunk Mason	1786	Museo del Prado, Madrid	35 x 15
The Poor at the Fountain (in Spanish)	1786 to 1787	Museo del Prado, Madrid	277 x 115
A woman and two children by a fountain (sketch for The Poor at the Fountain)	1786	Thyssen-Bornemisza Museum, Madrid	35.5 x 18.8
Cats fighting (in Spanish)	1786 to 1787	Museo del Prado, Madrid	56 x 193
The Grape Harvest (in Spanish)	1786 to 1787	Museo del Prado, Madrid	275 x 190
The Grape Harvest (sketch)	1786	Clark Art Institute, Williamstown	34 x 24.2
Magpie in a tree (in Spanish)	1786 to 1787	Museo del Prado, Madrid	279 x 28
Summer	1786 to 1787	Museo del Prado, Madrid	276 x 641
The Threshing Floor (sketch for Summer)	1786 to 1787	Lázaro Galdiano Museum, Madrid	34 x 74
Asalto al coche (in Spanish)	1786 to 1787	Private collection	130 x 131
Driving an ashlar (in French)	1786 to 1787	Private collection	169 x 127
The swing (1787) (in Spanish)	1786 to 1787	Private collection	167 x 100
The greasy pole	1786 to 1787	Private collection	169 x 88
The fall (in Spanish)	1786 to 1787	Private collection	169 x 98
Village procession (in Spanish)	1786 to 1787	Private collection	169 x 98
Rounding up the bulls (in French)	1786 to 1787	Unknown (Note: known only from a copy believed to have been made by Jean Laurent (1816-1886).)	165 x 285
Miguel Fernandez Duran, marquess of Tolosa (in Polish)	1786 to 1787	Bank of Spain Building, Madrid	112 x 78
Hunter at a fountain (in Spanish)	1786 to 1787	Museo del Prado, Madrid	130 x 131
Shepherd playing a dulzaina (in Spanish)	1786 to 1788	Museo del Prado, Madrid	130 x 134
Charles III in hunting dress (in Spanish)	1786 to 1788	Museo del Prado, Madrid	210 x 127
Francisco Javier de Larrumbe (in Polish)	1787	Bank of Spain Building, Madrid	113 x 77
Vicente Joaquín Osorio de Moscoso (in Polish)	1787	Bank of Spain Building, Madrid	177 x 108
Holy family	1787	Museo del Prado, Madrid	63.5 x 51.5
Tobias and the angel	1787	Museo del Prado, Madrid	63.5 x 51.5
Santa Ludgarda (in Polish)	1787	Royal Monastery of San Joaquín and Santa Ana, Valladolid	220 x 160
Saint Bernard of Clairvaux curing a cripple	1787	Royal Monastery of San Joaquín and Santa Ana, Valladolid	220 x 160
The transit of St. Joseph (in Polish)	1787	Royal Monastery of San Joaquín and Santa Ana, Valladolid	220 x 153
The transit of St. Joseph (sketch)	1787	Flint Institute of Arts	54.5 x 40.5
Manuel Osorio Manrique de Zúñiga	1787 to 1788	The Met, New York City	110 x 80
The Countess of Altamira and her Daughter (in Polish)	1787 to 1788	The Met, New York City	195 x 115
María Ramona de Barbachano (in Polish)	1787 to 1788	Private collection	114.4 x 83.6
Antonio Adán de Yarza (in Polish)	1787 to 1788	Private collection	114.4 x 83.6
Bernarda Tavira (in Polish)	1787 to 1788	Private collection	76.6 x 59.3
Portrait of Vicente Osorio de Moscoso, count of Trastamar (in Polish)	1787 to 1788	Museum of Fine Arts, Houston	138.4 x 104.1
The meadow of San Isidro (in Spanish)	1788	Museo del Prado	41.9 x 90.8
The hermitage of San Isidro on the feast day (in Spanish)	1788	Museo del Prado	42 x 44
St. Francis Borgia says goodbye to his family (in Polish)	1788	Valencia Cathedral	350 x 300
St. Francis Borgia says goodbye to his family (sketch)	1788	Private collection	38 x 29.3
St. Francis Borgia at the Deathbed of an Impenitent (in Spanish)	1788	Valencia Cathedral	350 x 300
St. Francis Borgia at the Deathbed of an Impenitent (sketch)	1788	Private collection	38 x 29.3
The Duke and Duchess of Osuna and their Children	1788	Museo del Prado, Madrid	225 x 171
José de Cistué y Coll, baron of la Menglana (in Polish)	1788	Museo de Huesca	210 x 140
José de Cistué y Coll (in Polish)	1788	Museo Camón Aznar, Zaragoza	114 x 82.5
Portrait of Francisco Cabarrús (in Polish)	1788	Bank of Spain Building, Madrid	210 x 127
The Holy Family (in Spanish)	1788 to 1790	Museo del Prado, Madrid	203 x 148
Blind Man's Bluff	1789	Museo del Prado, Madrid	269 x 350
Blind Man's Bluff (sketch)	1788	Museo del Prado, Madrid	41 x 44
Charles IV in red (in Spanish)	1789	Museo del Prado, Madrid	127.3 x 94.3
Queen of Spain Maria Louisa, née Bourbon-Parma (Goya)	1789	Museo del Prado, Madrid	127 x 94
Charles IV in court dress (in Spanish)	1789	Museo del Prado, Madrid	203 x 137
María Luisa of Parma wearing panniers (in French)	1789	Museo del Prado, Madrid	205 x 132
Portrait of Charles IV of Spain (in Polish)	1789	Real Academia de la Historia, Madrid	137 x 110
María Luisa of Parma, queen of Spain	1789	Real Academia de la Historia, Madrid	137 x 110
Portrait of King Charles IV of Spain (in Polish)	1789	Zaragoza Museum	152 x 110
Queen of Spain Maria Louisa	1789	Zaragoza Museum	152 x 110
Portrait of King Charles IV of Spain	1789	General Archive of the Indies, Seville	128 x 95.5
María Luisa of Parma, queen of Spain	1789	General Archive of the Indies, Seville	128 x 95.5
Juan Martín de Goicoechea y Galarza (in Polish)	1790	Zaragoza Museum	84 x 65
Portrait of Tadea Arias de Enríquez (in Polish)	c. 1790	Museo del Prado, Madrid	191 x 106
Antonio Aniceto de Porlier, marquess of Bajamar	c. 1790	Private collection	101 x 80
María Jerónima Daoíz y Guendica	c. 1790	Private collection	103.4 x 81.5
Portrait of Ramón Pignatelli (in Polish)	1790	Private collection	79.5 x 62
Portrait of Martín Zapater (in Spanish)	1790	Museo de Arte de Ponce, Ponce	82.8 x 64.5
Apparition of the Virgin to St. Julian	c. 1790	Church of Nuestra Señora de la Asunción, Valdemoro	250 x 90
La Tirana	1790 to 1792	Real Academia de Bellas Artes de San Fernando, Madrid	206 x 130
Sleeping woman (in French)	1790 to 1793	Private collection	59 x 145
Self-portrait at an Easel	c. 1790 to 1795	Real Academia de Bellas Artes de San Fernando, Madrid	42 x 28
The Countess of Casa Flores (in Polish)	1790 to 1797	São Paulo Museum of Art	112 x 79
The embroiderer Juan López de Robredo (in Polish)	1790 to 1800	Private collection	107 x 81
Portrait of Luis María de Cistué y Martínez (in Polish)	1791	Louvre, Paris	118 x 87.5
Women chatting (in Spanish)	1791 to 1792	Wadsworth Atheneum, Hartford	59.1 x 142.9
The game of horse and rider (in Spanish)	1791 to 1792	Museo del Prado, Madrid	137 x 104
Stilts (in Spanish)	1791 to 1792	Museo del Prado, Madrid	268 x 320
The Wedding (in Spanish)	1791 to 1792	Museo del Prado, Madrid	269 x 396
Women carrying pitchers (in Spanish)	1791 to 1792	Museo del Prado, Madrid	262 x 160
Women carrying pitchers (sketch) (in Spanish)	1791	Private collection	34 x 21
Boys climbing a tree (in Spanish)	1791 to 1792	Museo del Prado, Madrid	141 x 111
The straw manikin (in Spanish)	1791 to 1792	Museo del Prado, Madrid	267 x 160
The straw manikin (sketch)	1791	Hammer Museum, Los Angeles	35.6 x 23.3
Portrait of Sebastián Martínez (in Spanish)	1792	The Met, New York City	93 x 68
Portrait of Juan Agustín Ceán Bermúdez (in Polish)	1792 to 1793	Private collection	122 x 88
Portrait of Senora Ceán Bermudez (in Polish)	1792 to 1793	Museum of Fine Arts (Budapest)	121 x 84.5

== Paintings (1793–1807) ==
Image Title	Date	Current location	Size (in cm's)
The death of the picador (in Spanish)	1793	Private collection	43 x 31
Shipwreck	1793	Private collection	50 x 32
Strolling Players (in Spanish)	1793	Museo del Prado, Madrid	43 x 32
The doll seller	1793	Private collection	42 x 34
Pase de capa	1793	Private collection	42 x 31
The drag	1793	Private collection	43 x 32
Luck of killing	1793	Private collection	42 x 31
Clearance of the plaza	1793	Private collection	42 x 31
Banderillas in the field (Goya)	1793	Private collection	43 x 32
El toro enmaromado	1793	Private collection	42 x 31
Bulls in the pasture	1793	Private collection	42 x 31
Picador caught by the bull	1793	Private collection	43 x 32
Fire at Night	1793 to 1794	Banco Inversion-Agepasa, Madrid	43 x 32
Yard with Lunatics	1793 to 1794	Meadows Museum, Dallas	43.8 x 32.7
Prison Interior	c. 1793 to 1794	Bowes Museum, Barnard Castle	42.9 x 31.7
Assault of Thieves	1793 to 1794	Colección Juan Abelló	42 x 31
Portrait of General Antonio Ricardos (in Polish)	1793 to 1794	Museo del Prado, Madrid	112 x 84
Portrait of General Antonio Ricardos (in Polish)	1793 to 1794	Private collection	110 x 81
Portrait of General Antonio Ricardos (in Polish)	1793 to 1794	Walters Art Museum, Baltimore	94.8 x 74.8
General Ricardos, before his cannon (in Polish)	1793 to 1794	Private collection	225 x 110
Portrait of the Marquise de la Solana	c. 1793 to 1795	Louvre, Paris	181 x 122
Gallant colloquium	1793 to 1797	Private collection	41 x 31
Gallant colloquium	1793 to 1797	Musée des Beaux-Arts d'Agen, Agen	55 x 39.6
Portrait of Félix Colón de Larriátegui (in Spanish)	1794	Indianapolis Museum of Art	110 x 84
Ramón de Posada y Soto (in Polish)	1794	Fine Arts Museums of San Francisco	113 x 74
Equestrian portrait of Manuel Godoy	1794	Private collection	55.2 x 44.5
La Tirana	1794	Private collection	112 x 79
Pedro Gil de Tejada (in Polish)	1793 to 1795	Private collection	112 x 84
Juan José de Arias Saavedra y Verdugo (in Polish)	1794 to 1795	Private collection	82 x 55
The White Duchess	1795	Liria Palace, Madrid	192 x 128
The Duchess of Alba and la Beata	1795	Museo del Prado, Madrid	33 x 27.7
La Beata with children	1795	Private collection	31 x 25
Francisco Bayeu (in Polish)	1795	Museo del Prado, Madrid	112 x 84
Don Valentín Bellvís de Moncada y Pizarro por Goya (in Polish)	1795	Private collection	115 x 83
Duke of Roca (in Polish)	1795	San Diego Museum of Art	108.3 x 82.6
Un garrochista (in French)	1795	Museo del Prado, Madrid	57 x 47
Portrait of Jose Alvarez de Toledo, Duke of Alba and Marquess of Villafranca (in French)	1795	Art Institute of Chicago	88.9 x 68.6
Portrait of José María Álvarez de Toledo, 15th Duke of Medina Sidonia	1795	Private collection	86 x 71
Don José Álvarez de Toledo Osorio y Gonzaga, 11th Marquis of Villafranca, Duke of Alba	1795	Museo del Prado, Madrid	195 x 120
The widowed marchioness of Villafranca (in Polish)	1795	Museo del Prado, Madrid	87 x 72
Portrait of the Matador Pedro Romero (in Spanish)	c. 1795 to 1798	Kimbell Art Museum, Fort Worth	84.1 x 65
Self-Portrait on Linen (in Polish)	1795 to 1797	Museo del Prado, Madrid	18.2 x 12.2
Judge Altamirano (in Polish)	1796	Montreal Museum of Fine Arts	84.2 x 62.9
The parable of the wedding guests	1796 to 1797	Oratorio Santa Cueva, Cádiz	146 x 340
The miracle of the loaves and fishes	1796 to 1797	Oratorio Santa Cueva, Cádiz	146 x 340
The Last Supper	1796 to 1797	Oratorio Santa Cueva, Cádiz	147 x 344
The Last Supper (sketch)	1796 to 1797	Private collection	25 x 42
Portrait of toreador José Romero	1796 to 1798	Museum of Art, Philadelphia	92 x 76
Saint Ambrose (Goya)	1796 to 1799	Cleveland Museum of Art	190 x 113
Saint Augustine	1796 to 1799	Private collection	190 x 115
Saint Gregory	1796 to 1799	Museo Romántico, Madrid	191.5 x 116
The Countess of Chinchón with mantilla	1797	Private collection	81 x 75 cm (unframed)
The Black Duchess	1797	Hispanic Society of America, New York City	210 x 149
Portrait of Martín Zapater (in Polish)	1797	Bilbao Fine Arts Museum	83 x 65
Portrait of don Bernardo de Iriarte	1797	Musée des Beaux-Arts de Strasbourg	108 x 84
Portrait of Juan Meléndez Valdés (in Polish)	1797	Bowes Museum, Barnard Castle	73.3 x 57.1
Portrait of Juan Meléndez Valdés	1797	Private collection	73.3 x 57.1
Witches Sabbath	1797 to 1798	Lázaro Galdiano Museum, Madrid	43 x 30
Witches' Flight	1797 to 1798	Museo del Prado, Madrid	43.5 x 30.5
The Incantation	1797 to 1798	Lázaro Galdiano Museum, Madrid	43.5 x 30.5
The Devil's Lamp	1797 to 1798	National Gallery	42 x 32
The Witches' Kitchen	1797 to 1798	Unknown	45 x 32
Don Juan and the Commendatore	1797 to 1798	Unknown	43 x 32
Self-Portrait with Spectacles (in Spanish)	1797 to 1800	Goya Museum, Castres	54 x 39.5
Self-Portrait with Spectacles II	1797 to 1800	Musée Bonnat, Bayonne	54 x 39.5
Portrait of Mariana Waldstein (in Polish)	1797 to 1800	Louvre, Paris	142 x 97
Portrait of Mariana Waldstein, 9th Marchioness of de Santa Cruz (in Polish)	1797 to 1800	Louvre, Paris	52 x 34
The Nude Maja	1797 to 1800	Museo del Prado, Madrid	97 x 190
Saint Jerome	1798	Norton Simon Museum, Pasadena	193 x 115
The arrest of Christ (in Spanish)	1798	Toledo Cathedral	300 x 200
The arrest of Christ (in Spanish)	1798	Museo del Prado	40.2 x 23.1
Portrait of Don Francisco de Saavedra (in Polish)	1798	Courtauld Gallery, London	100.2 x 119.6
Portrait of Francisco de Saavedra	1798	Courtauld Institute of Art, London	196 x 118
Portrait of Ferdinand Guillemardet	1798	Louvre, Paris	186 x 124
A Miracle of St. Anthony of Padua” and other scenes (in Polish)	1798	Royal Chapel of St. Anthony of La Florida, Madrid	
Portrait of Asensio Julià (in German)	1798	Thyssen-Bornemisza Museum, Madrid	55 x 41
Portrait of Gaspar Melchor de Jovellanos (in Spanish)	1798	Museo del Prado, Madrid	205 x 133
The Duke of Osuna (in Polish)	1798	Frick Collection, New York City	113 x 82.3
Portrait of Andrés del Peral (in Spanish)	1798	National Gallery, London	95 x 65.7
San Luis Gonzaga (in Polish)	1798	Zaragoza Museum	261 x 160
General Jose de Urrutia (in Polish)	1798	Museo del Prado, Madrid	199 x 133
Portrait of Mariano Luis de Urquijo (in Polish)	1797 to 1799	Real Academia de la Historia, Madrid	128 x 97
Appearance of San Isidoro to King Fernando el Santo before the walls of Seville	1798 to 1800	Museo Nacional de Bellas Artes (Buenos Aires)	360 x 400
Portrait of Cardinal Luis María de Borbón y Vallabriga (in Polish)	1798 to 1800	São Paulo Museum of Art	200 x 106
Allegory of Love, Cupid and Psyche (in French)	1798 to 1805	Museu Nacional d'Art de Catalunya, Barcelona	220.5 x 155.5
Saint Lucy (Goya)	c. 1793 to 1799	Neue Pinakothek, Madrid	64 x 49.5
Charles IV in his Hunting Clothes	1799	Royal Palace of Madrid	210 x 130
Queen Maria Luisa, on Horseback (in Spanish)	1799	Museo del Prado, Madrid	338 x 282
St. Hermenegild in Prison	1799	Lázaro Galdiano Museum, Madrid	23 x 30
Portrait of Leandro Fernández de Moratín (in Polish)	1799	Real Academia de Bellas Artes de San Fernando, Madrid	73 x 56
Manuel Lapeña, Marquis of Bondad Real (in Polish)	1799	Hispanic Society of America, New York City	225 x 140
Queen María Luisa, in a Mantilla	1799	Royal Palace of Madrid	205 x 130
Portrait of Maria Luisa of Parma	c. 1793 to 1799 (Note: long thought to be a copy after an autograph work by Goya, but they have now been definitively reattributed as autograph works by Goya himself, produced late in the 18th century)	Museo di Capodimonte, Naples	202 x 124
Charles IV in the uniform of a colonel of the Guardia de Corps (in Spanish)	1799 to 1800	Royal Collections Gallery, Madrid	202 x 126
Queen Maria Luisa of Spain	1799 to 1800	Royal Collections Gallery, Madrid	210 x 130
The Countess of Chinchon	1800	Museo del Prado, Madrid	216 x 144
The Count of the Tagus	1800	National Gallery of Ireland, Dublin	61 x 51
Ferdinand of Bourbon, prince of Asturias (in Polish)	1800	The Met, New York City	83.2 x 66.7
Ferdinand prince of Asturias, later Ferdinand VII	1800	Private collection	52 x 39
Queen Maria Luisa of Spain	1800	Private collection	63 x 52
Portrait of Maria Josefa of Spain (in Spanish)	1800	Museo del Prado, Madrid	74 x 60
Portrait of the Infante Carlos María Isidro of Spain (in Spanish)	1800	Museo del Prado, Madrid	74 x 60
The infante Francisco de Paula (in Spanish)	1800	Museo del Prado, Madrid	74 x 60
The infante Antonio Pascual (in Spanish)	1800	Museo del Prado, Madrid	72.5 x 59.3
Portrait of Luis of Etruria (in Spanish)	1800	Museo del Prado, Madrid	72.5 x 59.4
Archbishop Joaquin Company (in Polish)	1800	Alma Mater Museum, Zaragoza	199 x 102.5
Bust of Joaquin Company	1800	Museo del Prado, Madrid	31 x 44
Truth, Time and History	1800	National Museum of Fine Arts, Stockholm	294 x 244
Truth, Time and History	1800	Museum of Fine Arts, Boston	41 x 32.5
The Dream	1800	National Gallery of Ireland, Dublin	46.5 x 76
Portrait of María Luisa de Borbón y Vallabriga	1800	Uffizi, Florence	220 x 140
Infante Maria Isabella	1800	Private collection	84 x 67
Archbishop Joaquin Company	1800	Speed Art Museum, Louisville	72 x 55
Lorenzo Correa	1800	Private collection	80 x 58
Charles IV on horseback (in Spanish)	1800 to 1801	Museo del Prado, Madrid	336 x 282
Charles IV of Spain and His Family	1800 to 1801	Museo del Prado, Madrid	282 x 336
Young Lady Wearing a Mantilla and Basquina (in Polish)	1800 to 1805	National Gallery of Art, Washington D.C.	109.5 x 77.5
Cannibals contemplating human remains (in French)	1800 to 1805	Musée des Beaux-Arts et d'Archéologie de Besançon, Besancon	31 x 45
Portrait of Tomás Pérez de Estala (in Spanish)	1800 to 1805	Kunsthalle Hamburg	102 x 79
Portrait of Tomás Pérez de Estala (Goya)	1800 to 1805	Private collection	99 x 77.5
The Clothed Maja	c. 1800 to 1807	Museo del Prado, Madrid	95 x 188
Cannibals chopping up victims (in French)	1800 to 1808	Musée des Beaux-Arts et d'Archéologie de Besançon, Besancon	31 x 45
Manuel Cantín Lucientes	1800 to 1810	109.9 x 78.2	
Portrait of Manuel Godoy	1801	Real Academia de Bellas Artes de San Fernando, Madrid	180 x 267
Ghostly vision (Goya)	1801	Museo Camón Aznar, Zaragoza	
The bull "Barbudo" that killed Pepe Hillo	1801	Private collection	75.5 x 80
Don Antonio Noriega (Goya)	1801	National Gallery of Art, Washington D.C	102.6 x 80.9
Isidro González Velázquez	1801 to 1807	Art Institute of Chicago	93.3 x 67.2
Don José Queraltó (in Polish)	1802	Neue Pinakothek, Munich	101.5 x 76.1
Portrait of Joaquina Candado Ricarte (in Polish)	1802	Museu de Belles Arts de València	169 x 118.3
Portrait of María Ana Silva-Bazán y Waldstein, Countess of Haro	1802 to 1803	Private collection	59 x 36
The Count of Fernán Núñez (in Spanish)	1803	Private collection	211 x 137
The Countess of Fernán Núñez (in Spanish)	1803	Private collection	211 x 137
Portrait of Amalia Bonells de Costa	1803	Detroit Institute of Arts	88 x 66
Bartolome Sureda y Miserol (in Spanish)	c. 1803 to 1804	National Gallery of Art, Washington D.C	119.7 x 79.3
Portrait of a Man in a Brown Coat (in French)	1803 to 1806	Museum of Fine Arts, Boston	88 x 66
Ignacio Garcini y Queralt (in Polish)	1804	The Met, New York City	104.1 x 83.2
Josefa de Castilla Portugal y van Asbrock de Garcini (in Polish)	1804	The Met, New York City	104.1 x 82.2
An Officer (probably the Count of Teba) (in Polish)	1804	Frick Collection	63.2 x 48.9
Portrait of the Marquesa de Lazan (in Spanish)	1804	Private collection	193 x 115
Portrait of the Marquesa de Santiago (in French)	1804	J. Paul Getty Museum, Los Angeles	209.6 x 126.4
Portrait of the Marquess de San Adrián (in Spanish)	1804	Museum of Navarre, Pamplona	209 x 127
Brigadier General Alberto Foraster	1804	Hispanic Society of America, New York City	138 x 109
The Marchioness of Villafranca Painting her Husband (in Spanish)	1804	Museo del Prado, Madrid	195 x 126
The Marquess de Castrofuerte	1804 to 1806	Montreal Museum of Fine Arts	91 x 71
The Marquesa de Castrofuerte	1804 to 1806	Montreal Museum of Fine Arts	91 x 71
Allegory of Industry	1804 to 1806	Museo del Prado, Madrid	227 diameter
Allegory of Commerce	1804 to 1806	Museo del Prado, Madrid	227 diameter
Allegory of Agriculture (in French)	1804 to 1806	Museo del Prado, Madrid	227 diameter
Allegory of Poetry	1804 to 1806	National Museum of Fine Arts, Stockholm	298 x 326
Child of the Soria family	1804 to 1806	Private collection	112 x 80
Clara de Soria	1804 to 1808	Private collection	112 x 80
Portrait of Evaristo Pérez de Castro (in Polish)	1804 to 1808	Louvre, Paris	99 x 69
Doña Teresa Sureda	c. 1805	National Gallery of Art, Washington D.C.	120 x 79
Doña Antonia Zárate	c. 1805	National Gallery of Ireland, Dublin	103.5 x 82
Portrait of Doña Isabel de Porcel	c. 1805	National Gallery, London	82 x 54.6
Portrait of Juan de Villanueva (in Polish)	1805	Real Academia de Bellas Artes de San Fernando	90 x 67
Portrait of José de Vargas Ponce	1805	Real Academia de la Historia, Madrid	104 x 82
Portrait of Félix de Azara (in Polish)	1805	Museo Camón Aznar, Zaragoza	212 x 124
Portrait of the Marchioness of Santa Cruz	1805	Museo del Prado, Madrid	124.7 x 207.9
Leonora Antonia Valdés de Barruso	1805	Private collection	104 x 83
Portrait of María Vicenta Barruso Valdés	1805	Private collection	104 x 83
Francisco Javier Goya y Bayeu	1805	Private collection	192 x 115
Gumersinda Goicoechea	1805	Private collection	192 x 115
Portrait of Francisco Javier Goya y Bayeu	1805	Zaragoza Museum	8 in diameter
Portrait of Gumersinda Goicoechea	1805	Zaragoza Museum	8 in diameter
Juana Galarza de Goicoechea	1805	Museo del Prado	8 in diameter
Manuela Goicoechea y Galarza	1805	Museo del Prado	8 in diameter
Martín Mariano de Goicoechea	1805	Norton Simon Museum, Pasadena	8 in diameter
Portrait of Pedro Mocarte	1805 to 1806	Hispanic Society of America, New York City	78 x 57
Portrait of Antonio Raimundo Ibáñez	1805 to 1808	Baltimore Museum of Art	96.5 x 72.4
Portrait of Manuel García de la Prada (in Polish)	1805 to 1808	Des Moines Art Center	212 x 128
Portrait of Don Antonio de Porcel (in Polish)	1806	Destroyed by fire in 1953	113 x 82
Portrait of Don Tadeo Bravo de Rivero (in Polish)	1806	Brooklyn Museum	207 x 116
El Maragato Threatens Friar Pedro de Zaldivia with his gun (Goya)	1806	Art Institute of Chicago	29.2 x 38.5
Friar Pedro offers shoes to el Maragato and Prepares to Push Aside his gun	1806	Art Institute of Chicago	29.2 x 38.5
Friar Pedro wrests the gun from El Maragato	1806	Art Institute of Chicago	29.2 x 38.5
Friar Pedro Clubs El Maragato with the Butt of the Gun	1806	Art Institute of Chicago	29.2 x 38.5
Friar Pedro shoots El Maragato as his horse runs off	1806	Art Institute of Chicago	29.2 x 38.5
Friar Pedro Binds El Maragato with a Rope	1806	Art Institute of Chicago	29.2 x 38.5
Portrait of Francisca Vicenta Chollet y Caballero	1806	Norton Simon Museum, Pasadena	102.9 x 80.9
Portrait of a Lady with a fan (in Polish)	1806 to 1807	Louvre, Paris	103 x 83
Francisca Sabasa y Garcia	1806 to 1811	National Gallery of Art, Washington D.C	71 x 58
Portrait of Isidoro Máiquez	1807	Museo del Prado, Madrid	72 x 59
Portrait of Isidoro Máiquez	1807	Art Institute of Chicago	82.3 x 63.3
Portrait of José Antonio Marqués Caballero (in Polish)	1807	Museum of Fine Arts (Budapest)	106 x 84
Marquesa de Caballero (in Polish)	1807	Neue Pinakothek, Munich	104.7 x 83.7

== Paintings (1808–1818) ==
Image Title	Date	Current location	Size (in cm's)
Portrait of the Officer Pantaleón Pérez de Nenin (in Polish)	1808	Private collection	206 x 124.7
Equestrian portrait of Ferdinand VII (in French)	1808	Real Academia de Bellas Artes de San Fernando, Madrid	285 x 205
Equestrian portrait of Ferdinand VII (sketch)	1808	Musée des Beaux-Arts d'Agen, Agen	40 x 28
Scene of disciplines	1808	Museo Nacional de Bellas Artes, Buenos Aires	51 x 57
Fire in a hospital	1808	Museo Nacional de Bellas Artes, Buenos Aires	72 x 99
War scene	1808	Museo Nacional de Bellas Artes, Buenos Aires	72 x 99.5
Ferdinand VII	1808	São Paulo Museum of Art	83 x 67
The Colossus (Note: attribution to Goya not certain)	c. 1808 to 1812	Museo del Prado, Madrid	116 x 105
Still Life of a Lamb's Head and Flanks	1808 to 1812	Louvre, Paris	45 x 62
Plucked turkey (in Spanish)	1808 to 1812	Alte Pinakothek, Munich	45 x 62.5
Dead turkey	1808 to 1812	Museo del Prado, Madrid	45 x 62
Still life with dead birds (in Polish)	1808 to 1812	Museo del Prado, Madrid	45.5 x 62.5
Dead woodcocks (in Polish)	1808 to 1812	Meadows Museum, Dallas	42.5 x 62.6
Still life with three salmon steaks (in Polish)	1808 to 1812	Am Römerholz, Winterthur	45 x 62
Still Life with Golden Bream (in Polish)	1808 to 1812	Museum of Fine Arts, Houston	44.8 x 62.6
Still life with bottles, fruits and bread (in Polish)	1808 to 1812	Am Römerholz, Winterthur	45 x 62
Dead hares (in Polish)	1808 to 1812	The Met	45 x 63
Dead duck (in Polish)	1808 to 1812	Private collection	62 x 45
The Knifegrinder	1808 to 1812	Museum of Fine Arts (Budapest)	68 x 50.5
The water bearer	1808 to 1812	Museum of Fine Arts (Budapest)	68 x 50.5
Lazarillo de Tormes (in Spanish)	1808 to 1812	Private collection	80 x 65
Confessions in a prison	1808 to 1812	Monastery of Santa María de Guadalupe	40 x 65
Maja and Celestine on the balcony (in French)	1808 to 1812	Private collection	166 x 108
Procession in Valencia	1808 to 1812	Foundation E.G. Bührle, Zürich	105 x 126
Scene from the Spanish War of Independence	1808 to 1812	Museo Nacional de Bellas Artes, Buenos Aires	72 x 99.5
Communion before the battle	1808 to 1812	Private collection	30 x 39
Scene of kidnapping and murder	1808 to 1812	Städel Museum, Frankfurt	30 x 39
Women attacked by soldiers	1808 to 1812	Städel Museum, Frankfurt	30 x 39
Portrait of Lola Jiménez	1808 to 1812	Pushkin Museum, Moscow	72 x 96
Bandits shooting their prisoners	1808 to 1812	Private collection	40 x 32
Bandit stripping a woman	1808 to 1812	Private collection	40 x 32
Bandit murdering a woman (in German)	1808 to 1812	Private collection	40 x 32
Gypsy cave	1808 to 1812	Private collection	33 x 57
Execution in a military camp	1808 to 1812	Private collection	33 x 57
Plague hospital	1808 to 1812	Private collection	32.5 x 57.3
Interior of a prison (in Spanish)	1808 to 1812	Private collection	40 x 32
The Friar's visit (in Spanish)	1808 to 1812	Private collection	40 x 32
Churching of women	1808 to 1812	Musée des Beaux-Arts d'Agen, Agen	53 x 77
Masked ball	1808 to 1820	Museo Camón Aznar, Zaragoza	30 x 38
Manuel Silvela (in Polish)	1809	Museo del Prado, Madrid	95 x 68
The Hanged Monk	c. 1810	Art Institute of Chicago	31 x 39.2
General Manuel Romero	c. 1810	Art Institute of Chicago	105 x 84
Allegory of the City of Madrid (in Spanish)	1810	Museum of the History of Madrid	260 x 195
José Costa y Bonells, called Pepito	c. 1810	The Met, New York City	105.1 x 84.5
Time and the old woman (in French)	1810	Palais des Beaux-Arts de Lille	181 x 125
Portrait of marquise de Montehermoso (in Spanish)	1810	Private collection	170 x 103
Mariano Goya (1810) (in Spanish)	1810	Private collection	113 x 78
Victor Guye	1810	National Gallery of Art, Washington D.C.	103.5 x 84.5
General Nicolas Philippe Guye (in Spanish)	1810	Virginia Museum of Fine Arts, Richmond	106 x 84.7
Martín Miguel de Goicoechea	1810	Private collection	82 x 59
Juana Galarza de Goicochea	1810	Private collection	82 x 59
Portrait of Ferdinand VII	1810	Palacio de Navarra, Pamplona	103 x 82
Narcisa Barañana de Goicoechea (in Polish)	1810	The Met, New York City	112.4 x 78.1
Night Scene from the Inquisition	1810 (Note: most experts believe this is a genuine Goya)	National Museum of Art, Oslo	30.1 x 40
Portrait of Doña Antonia Zárate	1810 to 1811	Hermitage Museum, St. Petersburg	71 x 58
Portrait of Juan Antonio Llorente	1810 to 1811	São Paulo Museum of Art	189 x 114.5
Majas on a Balcony	1810 to 1812	Private collection	162 x 107
Majas on a Balcony (Note: Possibly by a follower of Goya)	1810 to 1812	The Met, New York City	195 x 125.5
Saint John the Baptist in the Desert	1810 to 1812	Museo del Prado, Madrid	112 x 82
Portrait of a young man in brown	1810 to 1815	Museum of Fine Arts, Boston	81.3 x 58.1
Equestrian portrait of the Duke of Wellington (in Polish)	1812	Apsley House, London	294 x 240
Portrait of the Duke of Wellington	1812 to 1814	National Gallery, London	64.3 x 52.4
Mariano Goya (1815) (in Spanish)	c. 1812 to 1814	Private collection	59 x 47
Scene of carnival	1812 to 1816	Pushkin Museum, Moscow	104 x 84
Hot-air balloon (in French)	1812 to 1816	Musée des Beaux-Arts d'Agen, Agen	105 x 84
The Madhouse	1812 to 1819	Real Academia de Bellas Artes de San Fernando, Madrid	45 x 72
The Inquisition Tribunal	c. 1812 to 1819	Real Academia de Bellas Artes de San Fernando, Madrid	46 x 73
The Burial of the Sardine	1812 to 1819	Real Academia de Bellas Artes de San Fernando, Madrid	82.5 x 52
A Procession of Flagellants	1812 to 1819	Real Academia de Bellas Artes de San Fernando, Madrid	46 x 73
A Village Bullfight	1812 to 1819	Real Academia de Bellas Artes de San Fernando, Madrid	45 x 72
Penitent Magdalene	1813 to 1818	Lázaro Galdiano Museum, Madrid	65 x 52
Portrait of Ferdinand VII of Spain (in Polish)	1814	MAS, Santander	225 x 124
The Second of May 1808	1814 (Note: Also known as The charge of the Mamelukes)	Museo del Prado, Madrid	280 x 336
The Second of May 1808 (sketch)	1814	Museo Camón Aznar, Zaragoza	24 x 32
The Third of May 1808	1814 (Note: Also known as The shootings on Prince Pío hill)	Museo del Prado, Madrid	268 x 347
General José de Palafox on Horseback	1814	Museo del Prado, Madrid	248 x 224
Portrait of Asensio Julià (in Polish)	1814	Clark Art Institute, Williamstown	73 x 57
Manufacture of bullets in the Sierra de Tardienta (in French)	1814	Palacio de la Zarzuela, Madrid	33 x 52
Manufacture of gunpowder in the Sierra de Tardienta (in French)	1814	Palacio de la Zarzuela, Madrid	32.9 x 52.2
Juan Martín Díez, the Determined (in French)	1814 to 1815	Private collection	84 x 65
Portrait of Ferdinand VII (Goya)	1814 to 1815	Thyssen-Bornemisza Museum, Madrid	84 x 63.5
Josefa Bayeu (in Polish)	1814 to 1816	Museo del Prado, Madrid	82.5 x 58.2
Actress Rita Luna (in Polish)	1814 to 1818	Private collection	43 x 35.5
Portrait of a picador		National Museum of Art, Oslo	77.1 x 57.8
Young Women with a Letter	c. 1814 to 1819	Musée des Beaux-Arts, Lille	181 x 125
Self-Portrait at 69 years	1815	Real Academia de Bellas Artes de San Fernando, Madrid	54 x 46
Self-Portrait	1815	Museo del Prado, Madrid	45.8 x 35.6
Ferdinand VII in an Encampment (in Polish)	c. 1815	Museo del Prado, Madrid	207 x 140
Portrait of Ferdinand VII	1815	Museo del Prado, Madrid	208 x 142.5
Ferdinand VII in his royal coat (in Polish)	1815	Zaragoza Museum	237 x 153
Portrait of the Duke of San Carlos (in Polish)	1815	Zaragoza Museum	237 x 153
Portrait of the Duke of San Carlos (sketch)	1815	Private collection	59 x 43
Don Juan Bautista de Goicoechea y Urrutia (in Polish)	1815	Staatliche Kunsthalle Karlsruhe	112 x 80
Portrait of Rafael Esteve Vilella (in Polish)	1815	Museu de Belles Arts de València	100.6 x 75.5
Manuel Quijano	1815	Museu Nacional d'Art de Catalunya, Barcelona	86.8 x 56.5
Portrait of José Munárriz (in Polish)	1815	Real Academia de Bellas Artes de San Fernando, Madrid	85 x 64
Don Ignacio Omulryan Rourera (in Polish)	1815	Nelson-Atkins Museum of Art, Missouri	84.4 x 64.4
Portrait of Francisco del Mazo (in French)	1815	Goya Museum, Castres	90.5 x 71
Portrait of Don Miguel De Lardizábal (in Polish)	1815	National Gallery Prague	75 x 65
The Junta of the Philippines	1815	Goya Museum, Castres	320 x 433
The Junta of the Philippines	1815	Painting Gallery, Berlin	54 x 70
Portrait of Friar Miguel Fernández Flores (in Spanish)	1815	Worcester Art Museum	100 x 84
Brother Juan Fernández de Rojas (in Polish)	1815 to 1816	Real Academia de la Historia, Madrid	75 x 54
The Forge	c. 1815 to 1820	Frick Collection, New York City	181.6 x 125.1
Portrait of Francisco Téllez-Girón, 10th Duke de Osuna (in Polish)	1816	Musée Bonnat, Bayonne	202 x 140
Portrait of Francisco Téllez-Girón, 10th Duke de Osuna (sketch)	1816	Unknown	32.5 x 24.5
Bullfight in a split square (in French)	1816	The Met, New York City	43 x 32
Saint Isabel of Portugal Healing the Wounds of a Sick Woman	1816	Royal Palace of Madrid	169 x 129
Saint Isabel of Portugal Healing the Wounds of a Sick Woman (sketch)	1816	Museo Lázaro Galdiano, Madrid	32 x 22
Portrait of Manuela Téllez Girón y Pimentel (in Polish)	1816	Museo del Prado, Madrid	92 x 70
Portrait of Prince Alois Wenzel Von Kaunitz-Rietberg (in Polish)	1816 to 1817	Private collection	59 x 48
Portrait of Queen María Isabel de Braganza y Borbón	1816 to 1818	Meadows Museum, Dallas	75.2 x 53
The Greasy Pole	1816 to 1818	Old National Gallery, Berlin	85 x 130

== Paintings (1819–1828) ==
Image Title	Date	Current location	Size (in cm's)
Posthumous portrait of Queen Maria Isabel de Braganza	1819	Private collection	74 x 59 cm (unframed)
Caprices	1818 to 1819	Musée des Beaux-Arts d'Agen, Agen	37.8 x 50
Saints Justa and Rufina	1819	Seville Cathedral	309 x 177
Saints Justa and Rufina (sketch)	1819	Museo del Prado, Madrid	45 x 29
Portrait of Juan Antonio Cuervo	1819	Cleveland Museum of Art	136.8 x 105.1
The Last Communion of St. Joseph of Calasanz (in Spanish)	1819	Escuelas Pías de San Antón, Madrid	250 x 180
The Last Communion of St. Joseph of Calasanz (sketch) (in Spanish)	1819	Musée Bonnat, Bayonne	45.3 x 33.5
The Countess of Baena	1819	Museo Zuloaga, Zumaia	92 x 160
Christ on the Mount of Olives (in Spanish)	1819	Musée Calasancio, Madrid	47 x 35
Portrait of Don Juan Antonio Cuervo	1819	Cleveland Museum of Art	120 x 87
Tío Paquete	1819 to 1820	Thyssen-Bornemisza Museum, Madrid	39 x 31
Man Mocked by Two Women	1819 to 1823	Museo del Prado, Madrid	125.4 x 65.4
Men Reading	1819 to 1823	Museo del Prado, Madrid	125.3 x 65.2
Atropos (The Fates)	1819 to 1823	Museo del Prado, Madrid	123 x 266
Asmodea	1819 to 1823	Museo del Prado, Madrid	127 x 263
The Dog	1819 to 1823	Museo del Prado, Madrid	131.5 x 79.3
Fight with Cudgels	1819 to 1823	Museo del Prado, Madrid	123 x 266
The Great He-Goat or Witches Sabbath	1819 to 1823	Museo del Prado, Madrid	140.5 x 435.7
Saturn Devouring His Son	1819 to 1823	Museo del Prado, Madrid	143 x 81
Two Old Men	1819 to 1823	Museo del Prado, Madrid	146 x 66
Two Old Ones Eating Soup	1819 to 1823	Museo del Prado, Madrid	49.3 x 83.4
A Pilgrimage to San Isidro	1819 to 1823	Museo del Prado, Madrid	140 x 438
Pilgrimage to the Fountain of San Isidro	1819 to 1823	Museo del Prado, Madrid	127 x 266
Judith and Holofernes	1819 to 1823	Museo del Prado, Madrid	143.5 x 81.4
La Leocadia	1819 to 1823	Museo del Prado, Madrid	145.7 x 129.4
Heads in a landscape (in French)	1819 to 1823	Private collection	
Self-portrait with Dr Arrieta	1820	Minneapolis Institute of Art	114.6 x 76.5
Tiburcio Pérez y Cuervo, the Architect (in Polish)	1820	The Met, New York City	102.2 x 81.3
The repentant St. Peter	1820 to 1824	The Phillips Collection, Washington D.C.	28.8 x 25.6
Infante Don Sebastián Gabriel de Borbón y Braganza	1822	Private collection	144 x 105
Portrait of Don Ramón Satué	1823	Rijksmuseum, Amsterdam	107 x 83.5
Portrait of Dama con Mantilla (in Polish)	1823 to 1824	Zaragoza Museum	61 x 51
Bullfight	1824	J. Paul Getty Museum, Los Angeles	49.5 x 61
Portrait of José Duaso y Latre (in Polish)	1824	Museum of Fine Arts of Seville	74 x 59
Portrait of the poet Leandro Fernández de Moratín (in French)	1824	Bilbao Fine Arts Museum, Bilbao	60 x 49.5
Portrait of a lady in a black mantilla (in Polish)	1824	National Gallery of Ireland, Dublin	54 x 43
Father Jose de La Canal (in Polish)	1824	Lázaro Galdiano Museum, Madrid	74 x 65
Joaquín María Ferrer	1824	Private collection	73 x 59
Manuela Álvarez Coinas y Ferrer	1824	Private collection	73 x 60
Portrait of Maria Martínez de Puga (in Polish)	1824	Frick Collection, New York City	80 x 58.4
Monk Talking to an Old Woman	1824 to 1825	Princeton University Art Museum	5.7 x 5.4
Woman with her dresses inflated by the wind	1824 to 1825	Museum of Fine Arts, Boston	9 x 9.5
Boy scared by a man	1824 to 1825	Museum of Fine Arts, Boston	5.9 x 6
Half-naked young woman leaning on a rock	1824 to 1825	Museum of Fine Arts, Boston	8.8 x 8.6
Man looking for fleas in his shirt	1824 to 1825	Museum of Fine Arts, Boston	6 x 5.9
Two children looking at a book	1824 to 1825	Rhode Island School of Design Museum, Providence	5.2 x 5.3
Majo and maja sitting	1824 to 1825	National Museum of Fine Arts, Stockholm	8.8 x 8.3
Man eating leeks	1824 to 1825	Kupferstich-Kabinett, Dresden	6.2 x 5.6
Man spitting on a small dog	1824 to 1825	Kupferstich-Kabinett, Dresden	8.9 x 8.5
Two Moors	1824 to 1825	Orientalist Museum, Doha	8.5 x 8
Susanna and the Elders	1824 to 1825	Private collection	5.5 x 5.5
Desperate man with a dead child	1824 to 1825	Private collection	8.8 x 8.8
Maja and celestina	1824 to 1825	Private collection	5.4 x 5.4
Judith decapitating Holofernes	1824 to 1825	Private collection	8.7 x 8.5
Man's head	1824 to 1825	Private collection	5.5 x 5.5
Bust of an old beggar	1824 to 1825	Unknown	5.5 x 5.5
Three men drinking	1824 to 1825	Unknown	5.5 x 5.5
Six lunatics	1824 to 1825	Unknown	9 x 9
Man smoking a cigar	1824 to 1825	Unknown	5.5 x 5.5
Woman kneeling in the dark	1824 to 1825	Unknown	8.7 x 7.8
The Milkmaid of Bordeaux	1825 to 1827	Museo del Prado, Madrid	74 x 68
Portrait of Jacques Galos (in French)	1826	Barnes Foundation, Philadelphia	55.2 x 46.4
Don Juan Bautista de Muguiro (in French)	1827	Museo del Prado, Madrid	103 x 85
Mariano Goya, the Artist's Grandson (in Spanish)	1827	Meadows Museum, Dallas	52 x 41.2
Don José Pío de Molina (in French)	1827 to 1828	Reinhart Collection, Winterthur	60.5 x 50

== Prints (Los Caprichos) ==
As well as paintings Goya was also one of the greatest ever printmakers. He produced several sets of prints using the relatively new technique of aquatint. Towards the end of his life Goya also began to experiment with lithography. The dimensions given refer to the size of the printed image rather than the paper that the image is printed on.

Image Title	Method	Size (in cm's)
Francisco Goya y Lucientes, painter	Etching, aquatint, drypoint and engraving	20.5 x 15
They say yes and give their hand to the first comer	Etching and aquatint	21 x 14.5
Here comes the bogeyman	Etching and aquatint	21 x 15
Nanny's boy	Etching and aquatint	20.5 x 14.7
Two of a kind	Etching, aquatint and drypoint	19.2 x 14.7
No one knows	Etching and aquatint	21 x 14.8
Even thus he cannot make her out	Etching, aquatint and drypoint	19.2 x 14.5
They took her away!	Etching and aquatint	20.8 x 14.9
Tantalus	Etching and aquatint	20 x 14.9
Love and Death	Etching, aquatint and engraving	21 x 14.8
Lads making ready	Etching, aquatint and engraving	21 x 14.8
Out hunting for teeth	Etching, aquatint and engraving	20.9 x 14.6
They are hot	Etching and aquatint	21 x 14.8
What a sacrifice	Etching, aquatint and drypoint	19.3 x 14.5
Good advice	Etching, aquatint and engraving	20.5 x 14.5
For Heaven's sake: and it was her mother	Etching, aquatint and drypoint	20 x 14.7
It is nicely stretched	Etching, aquatint and engraving	20.5 x 14.6
And the house is burning	Etching and aquatint	21.6 x 15.2
Everyone will fall	Etching and aquatint	21.5 x 14.4
There they go plucked	Etching, aquatint and drypoint	21.5 x 15.1
How they pluck her!	Etching and aquatint	21.5 x 14.7
Poor little girls!	Etching and aquatint	21.5 x 15.2
Those specks of dust	Etching, aquatint, drypoint and engraving	21.5 x 14.7
There was no help	Etching and aquatint	21.5 x 15
He broke the pitcher	Etching, aquatint and drypoint	20.6 x 15.1
Now they are sitting well	Etching and aquatint	21.5 x 15.1
Who else surrendered	Etching, aquatint and drypoint	19.3 x 14.9
Hush	Etching, aquating and engraving	21.5 x 15.1
Now that's reading	Etching, aquatint and drypoint	21.4 x 14.6
Why hide them?	Etching, aquatint and drypoint	21.5 x 15.1
She prays for her	Etching, aquatint, drypoint and engraving	20.5 x 15
Because she was susceptible	Aquatint	21.5 x 15.1
To the count palatine	Etching, aquatint, drypoint and engraving	21.4 x 15
Sleep overcomes them	Etching and aquatint	21.4 x 15.2
She fleeces them	Etching and aquatint	21.5 x 15.2
A bad night	Etching and aquatint	21.4 x 15.2
Might not the pupil know more?	Etching, aquatint and engraving	21.3 x 15.1
Bravissimo!	Etching, aquatint and drypoint	21.5 x 15
And so was his grandfather	Aquatint	21.4 x 15
What will he die of?	Etching, aquatint, drypoint and engraving	21.4 x 14.9
No more no less	Etching, aquatint, drypoint and engraving	19.7 x 14.9
You can't	Etching and aquatint	21.3 x 15.2
The Sleep of Reason Produces Monsters	Etching and aquatint	21.3 x 15.1
They spin finely	Etching, aquatint, drypoint and engraving	21.5 x 15.1
There is plenty to suck	Etching and aquatint	20.4 x 14.9
Correction	Etching and aquatint	21.3 x 14.8
A gift for the master	Etching, aquatint and engraving	21.5 x 14.8
Snitches	Etching and aquatint	20.5 x 14.9
Hobgoblins	Etching and aquatint	21.4 x 15.1
The Chinchillas	Etching, aquatint and engraving	20.4 x 14.9
They spruce themselves up	Etching, aquatint and engraving	21 x 14.8
What a tailor can do	Etching, aquatint, drypoint and engraving	21.4 x 15
What a golden beak	Etching, aquatint and engraving	21.5 x 15
The shameful one	Etching and aquatint	21.4 x 15
Until death	Etching, aquatint and drypoint	21.5 x 15.2
Up and Down	Etching and aquatint	21.4 x 15.1
The filiation	Etching and aquatint	21.3 x 15.1
Swallow it, dog	Etching, aquatint and drypoint	21.4 x 15.1
And still they don't go	Etching, aquatint, drypoint and engraving	21.4 x 15
Trials	Etching, aquatint and engraving	20.6 x 16.4
They have flown	Etching, aquatint and drypoint	21.4 x 14.9
Who would have thought it	Etching, aquatint and engraving	20.4 x 15.1
Look how solemn they are	Etching, aquatint and drypoint	21.2 x 16.2
Bon Voyage	Etching, aquatint and engraving	21.5 x 15.1
Where is mom going	Etching, aquatint and drypoint	20.6 x 16.4
There it goes	Etching, aquatint and drypoint	20.5 x 16.5
Wait till you've been anointed	Etching, aquatint and drypoint	21.4 x 14.9
Pretty Teacher	Etching, aquatint and drypoint	20.9 x 14.8
Gust the wind	Etching, aquatint, drypoint and engraving	21 x 14.8
Devoted Profession	Etching, aquatint and drypoint	20.6 x 16.5
When day breaks, we will be off	Etching, aquatint and engraving	19.6 x 14.8
You will not escape	Etching and aquatint	21.2 x 14.9
It is better to be lazy	Etching, aquatint, drypoint and engraving	21.3 x 14.9
Don't scream, stupid	Etching and aquatint	21.3 x 15.1
Can't anyone untie us?	Etching and aquatint	21.3 x 14.9
You understand?... Well, as I say... eh! Look out! Otherwise...	Etching, aquatint and drypoint	21.3 x 15
What one does to the other	Etching, aquatint, drypoint and engraving	21.3 x 14.9
Be quick, they are waking up	Etching and aquatint	21.2 x 15
No one has seen us	Etching, aquatint and engraving	21.2 x 15
It is time	Etching, aquatint, drypoint and engraving	21.4 x 15.1

== Prints (Disasters of War) ==
Image Title	Method	Size (in cm's)
Sad forebodings of what is to come	Etching, drypoint and engraving	17.6 x 22
With or without reason	Etching, gouache, drypoint and engraving	15.3 x 20.6
The same	Etching, gouache, drypoint and engraving	15.9 x 21.9
The women give courage	Etching, aquatint, gouache, drypoint and engraving	15.5 x 20.6
And are wild beasts	Etching, aquatint and drypoint	15.5 x 20.9
It serves you right	Etching, gouache and engraving	14.3 x 20.8
What Courage	Etching, aquatint, drypoint and engraving	15.5 x 20.6
This always happens	Etching and drypoint	17.7 x 21.9
They do not want to	Etching, aquatint, drypoint and engraving	15.3 x 20.7
Nor do these	Etching and engraving	14.9 x 21.6
Or these	Etching, gouache, drypoint and engraving	16.1 x 21.1
This is what you were born for	Etching, gouache, drypoint and engraving	16 x 23.5
Bitter presence	Etching, gouache, drypoint and engraving	14.2 x 17.1
The way is hard	Etching, gouache, drypoint and engraving	14.3 x 16.8
And it can't be helped	Etching, drypoint and engraving	14.1 x 16.8
They avail themselves	Etching, gouache, drypoint and engraving	16.1 x 23.5
They do not agree	Etching, drypoint and engraving	14.5 x 21.6
Bury them and keep quiet	Etching, gouache, drypoint and engraving	16.1 x 23.4
There is no more time	Etching, gouache, drypoint and engraving	16.5 x 23.7
Treat them, then on to other matters	Etching, gouache and engraving	15.9 x 23.5
It will be the same	Etching and gouache	14.6 x 21.8
All this and more	Etching, gouache and engraving	16 x 25.3
The same thing elsewhere	Etching, gouache, drypoint and engraving	15.9 x 23.8
They'll still be useful	Etching	16.1 x 25.7
So will these	Etching, drypoint and engraving	16.2 x 23.3
One cannot look at these	Etching, gouache, drypoint and engraving	14.3 x 20.7
Charity	Etching, gouache, drypoint and engraving	16 x 23.3
Rabble	Etching, gouache, drypoint and engraving	17.5 x 21.9
He deserved it	Etching, drypoint and engraving	17.3 x 21.6
Ravages of war	Etching, drypoint and engraving	14 x 16.9
This is too much!	Etching, aquatint and drypoint	15.5 x 20.6
Why?	Etching, gouache, drypoint and engraving	15.4 x 20.7
What more can one do?	Etching, gouache, drypoint and engraving	15.4 x 20.7
On account of a knife	Etching, drypoint and engraving	15.5 x 20.7
Nobody knows why	Etching, gouache, drypoint and engraving	15.4 x 20.7
Not in this case either	Etching, aquatint, drypoint and engraving	15.5 x 20.6
This is worse	Etching, gouache and drypoint	15.5 x 20.8
Barbarians	Etching, aquatint and drypoint	15.5 x 20.6
Great deeds! Against the dead!	Etching, gouache and drypoint	15.4 x 20.6
There is something to be gained	Etching, drypoint and engraving	17.4 x 21.8
They escape through the flames	Etching and engraving	15.9 x 23.2
Everything is topsy-turvy	Etching and engraving	17.4 x 21.8
So is this	Etching and aquatint	15.4 x 20.6
I saw it	Etching, drypoint and engraving	15.8 x 23.5
And this to	Etching, aquatint, drypoint and engraving	16.4 x 22.1
This is bad	Etching, gouache, aquatint, drypoint and engraving	15.3 x 20.5
This is how it happened	Etching, gouache, drypoint and engraving	15.4 x 20.6
A cruel shame!	Etching, gouache and engraving	15.3 x 20.5
A woman's charity	Etching, gouache and engraving	15.4 x 20.5
Unhappy mother	Etching, aquatint and drypoint	15.5 x 20.7
Thanks to the grasspea	Etching and aquatint	15.4 x 20.4
They do not arrive in time	Etching, gouache, drypoint and engraving	15.6 x 20.7
There was nothing to be done and he died	Etching, gouache, aquatint and engraving	15.3 x 20.6
Vain laments	Etching, gouache and engraving	15.5 x 20.7
The worst is to beg	Etching, gouache and engraving	15.4 x 20.7
To the cemetery	Etching, gouache and drypoint	15.5 x 20.6
The sound and the sick	Etching, aquatint and engraving	15.4 x 20.7
It is no use shouting	Etching, aquatint and engraving	15.5 x 20.8
What good is a single cup?	Etching, gouache and aquatint	15.3 x 20.5
There is no one to help them	Etching, aquatint and engraving	15.3 x 20.7
Perhaps they are of another breed	Etching, gouache, drypoint and engraving	15.4 x 20.7
The deathbeds	Etching, gouache, drypoint and engraving	17.4 x 21.8
A collection of dead men	Etching and aquatint	15.3 x 20.6
Cartloads for the cemetery	Etching, aquatint, drypoint and engraving	15.2 x 20.8
What is this hubbub?	Etching, aquatint, gouache and engraving	17.4 x 21.9
Strange devotion	Etching, aquatint and gouache	17.4 x 21.9
This is no less curious	Etching, aquatint, gouache, drypoint and engraving	17.5 x 21.9
What madness?	Etching, gouache and engraving	16 x 22.1
We shall see	Etching, aquatint, gouache, drypoint and engraving	15.5 x 20.1
They don't know the way	Etching, drypoint and engraving	17.5 x 21.9
Against the common good	Etching	17.6 x 21.9
The consequences	Etching	17.6 x 21.7
Feline pantomime	Etching and engraving	17.5 x 21.7
This is the absolute worst	Etching	17.7 x 21.8
Troupe of charlatans	Etching, aquatint, gouache, drypoint and engraving	17.3 x 22
The carnivorous vulture	Etching and drypoint	17.5 x 22
Look, the rope is breaking	Etching, aquatint, gouache and drypoint	17.4 x 21.9
He defends himself well	Etching, drypoint and engraving	17.5 x 21.6
The truth has died	Etching	17.3 x 21.9
Will she live again	Etching	17.4 x 22
Proud monster	Etching, drypoint and engraving	17.5 x 21.6
This is the truth	Etching aquatint, drypoint and engraving	17.7 x 21.7

== Prints (La Tauromaquia) ==
Image	Title	Method	Size (in cm's)
	How the ancient Spaniards hunted bulls on horseback in the field	Etching, aquatint and drypoint	25 x 35.3
	Another way of hunting on foot	Etching, aquatint, drypoint and engraving	24.3 x 35.5
	The Moors established in Spain, regardless of the superstitions of their Quran, adopted this hunt and art, and they spear a bull on the field	Etching, aquatint, drypoint and engraving	24.4 x 35.2
	Another one is caped	Etching, aquatint, drypoint and engraving	24.6 x 35.4
	The spirited Moor Gazul was the first to spear bulls on horseback	Etching, aquatint and drypoint	24.6 x 35.3
	The Moors do another caping in the plaza with their bournouses	Etching, aquatint and drypoint	24.4 x 35.3
	Origin of the harpoon or banderillas	Etching, aquatint and drypoint	24.5 x 35.2
	A Moor getting caught while in the plaza	Etching, aquatint and drypoint	24.5 x 35.3
	A Spanish knight kills a bull after his horse is wounded	Etching, aquatint and engraving	24.6 x 35.2
	Carlos V spearing a bull in the plaza of Valladolid	Etching, aquatint, drypoint and engraving	25 x 35.1
	El Cid Campeador spearing another bull	Etching, aquatint and engraving	24.9 x 35.1
	Slashing of the leg with spears, half-moons, banderillas, and other weapons	Etching, aquatint and drypoint	25.1 x 35.3
	A Spanish knight in the plaza, breaking his spears without being helped by the "chulos"	Etching, aquatint, drypoint and engraving	24.7 x 35.3
	The dexterous student of Falces, embossed, tricks the bull with his breaks	Etching, aquatint, drypoint and engraving	24.7 x 35.5
	The famous Martincho putting banderillas while breaking	Etching, aquatint, drypoint and engraving	24.5 x 35.3
	He turns a bull upside down by himself in Madrid's plaza	Etching, aquatint, drypoint and engraving	24.6 x 35.2
	Palisade of the Moors made with donkeys to defend themselves of the enraged bull	Etching, aquatint, drypoint and engraving	24.4 x 35.3
	Temerity of Martincho in Zaragoza's plaza	Etching, aquatint and drypoint	24.6 x 35.4
	More of his madness in the same plaza	Etching, aquatint, drypoint and engraving	24.5 x 35.3
	Lightness and boldness of Juanito Apiñani in Madrid's Plaza	Etching and aquatint	24.5 x 35.3
	Unfortunate events in the front seats of the ring of Madrid, and the death of the mayor of Torrejón	Etching, aquatint, gouache, drypoint and engraving	24.7 x 35.3
	Manly valour of the celebrity Pajuelera in Zaragoza's Plaza	Etching, aquatint, drypoint and engraving	25 x 35.1
	Mariano Ceballos, aka "The Indian", kills the bull while riding his horse	Etching and aquatint	25 x 35
	The same Ceballos, riding another bull, breaks the "rejones" in Madrid's Plaza	Etching, aquatint, drypoint and engraving	24.3 x 35.3
	Dogs are thrown at the bull	Etching, aquatint and drypoint	24.5 x 35.3
	A "picador" falls from his horse, and beneath the bull	Etching, aquatint and drypoint	24.6 x 35.2
	The celebrity Fernando del Toro, "varilarguero", forcing the beast with his "garrocha"	Etching, aquatint, drypoint and engraving	24.4 x 35.1
	The vigorous Rendón stings a bull, who luckily died in Madrid's plaza	Etching, aquatint and engraving	25 x 35.2
	Pepe Illo cuts away at the bull	Etching, aquatint, drypoint and engraving	24.5 x 35.2
	Pedro Romero slaying a standing bull	Etching, aquatint, drypoint and engraving	24.5 x 35.4
	Fiery banderillas	Etching, aquatint, gouache, drypoint and engraving	24.5 x 35.3
	Two groups of "picadores" pinned down by a single bull	Etching, aquatint, drypoint and engraving	24.5 x 35.4
	The disgraceful death of Pepe Illo in Madrid's plaza	Etching, aquatint, drypoint and engraving	24.5 x 35.3
	Un caballero en plaza quebrando un rejoncillo con ayuda de un chulo	Etching, aquatint, drypoint and engraving	25.2 x 35
	Desgraciada embestida de un poderoso toro	Etching, aquatint and drypoint	24.6 x 34.8
	Perros al toro	Etching, aquatint, drypoint and engraving	24.5 x 34.7
	Un varilarguero, montado a hombros de un chulo, pica al toro	Etching, aquatint, gouache, drypoint and engraving	24.2 x 35.3
	Espanto y confusión en la defensa de un chulo cogido	Etching, aquatint, drypoint and engraving	25.2 x 34.7
	Varilarguero y chulos haciendo el quite a un torero cogido	Etching, aquatint, drypoint and engraving	24.5 x 34.9
	Función de mojiganga	Etching, aquatint, drypoint and engraving	25.3 x 34.9

== Prints (Los disparates) ==
Image Title	Method	Size (in cm's)
Feminine folly	Etching, aquatint and drypoint	24.3 x 35.8
Fearful folly	Etching, aquatint and drypoint	24.2 x 35.6
Ridiculous folly	Etching, aquatint and drypoint	24.2 x 35.7
Simpleton's folly	Etching, aquatint and drypoint	24.1 x 35.4
Flying folly	Etching and aquatint	24.4 x 35.8
Cruel folly	Etching and aquatint	24.3 x 35.7
Disordered folly	Etching, aquatint and drypoint	24.5 x 35.7
Folly in sacks	Etching and aquatint	24.3 x 35.5
General folly	Etching and aquatint	24.3 x 35.6
The kidnapping horse	Etching, aquatint and drypoint	24.2 x 35.4
Poor folly	Etching, aquatint, drypoint and engraving	24.4 x 35.6
Merry folly	Etching, aquatint and drypoint	24.4 x 35.6
A way of flying	Etching, aquatint and drypoint	24.5 x 35.8
Carnival folly	Etching and aquatint	24.2 x 35.5
Clear folly	Etching, gouache and aquatint	24.2 x 35.6
The exhortations	Etching and aquatint	24.4 x 35.7
Loyalty	Etching and aquatint	24.4 x 35.5
Funereal folly	Etching, aquatint and engraving	24.4 x 35.7
Nonsense of bulls	Etching, aquatint and drypoint	24.3 x 35.5
Nonsense of beasts	Etching, aquatint and drypoint	24.3 x 35.5
Known nonsense	Etching and aquatint	24.2 x 35.6
Punctual nonsense	Etching, aquatint and drypoint	24.6 x 35.6

== Prints (Bulls of Bordeaux) ==
Image Title	Method	Size (in cm's)
The celebrated American, Mariano Ceballos	Lithograph	31 x 40.2
A picador caught by a bull	Lithograph	31.1 x 41.6
Spanish entertainment	Lithograph	30.3 x 41.5
Bullfight in a divided ring	Lithograph	29.5 x 41.3

== Prints (Other prints) ==
Image Title	Method	Year	Size (in cm's)
Flight into Egypt	Etching	c. 1771–74	29.9 x 20.5
San Francisco de Paula	Etching and drypoint	c. 1775–80	13 x 9.5
Equestrian portrait of Felipe III (after Velázquez)	Etching and drypoint	1778	38 x 30.8
Equestrian portrait of Margaret of Austria (after Velázquez)	Etching and drypoint	1778	36.9 x 31.1
Equestrian portrait of Felipe IV ( after Velázquez)	Etching	1778	37.3 x 31.8
Equestrian portrait of Isabel de Bourbon (after Velázquez)	Etching and drypoint	1778	37.2 x 31.4
Equestrian portrait of Gaspar de Guzmán, Count-Duke of Olivares (after Velázquez)	Etching	1778	37.4 x 31.3
Menippus (after Velázquez)	Etching	1778	30.6 x 22
Aesop (after Velázquez)	Etching	1778	30 x 21.7
Sebastián de Morra (after Velázquez)	Etching	1778	20.9 x 14.8
Diego de Acedo, el Primo (after Velázquez)	Etching	1778	21.5 x 15.7
Equestrian portrait of Prince Baltasar Carlos (after Velázquez)	Etching	1778	35.2 x 22.3
The triumph of Bacchus or the drunkards (after Velázquez)	Etching	1778	32.2 x 43.6
The garotted man	Etching	c. 1778–85	32.9 x 21
Cardinal-Infante Ferdinand of Austria (after Velázquez)	Etching, aquatint and drypoint	1779–85	28.3 x 16.8
The jester Barbarossa (after Velázquez)	Etching, aquatint and engraving	1779–85	28.4 x 16.8
Landscape with building and trees	Etching, aquatint and engraving	c. 1799	17 x 27.6
Landscape with Waterfall	Etching and aquatint	c. 1799	16.8 x 27.7
Barbara Dibesion	Etching, aquatint and drypoint	c. 1800–04	17.7 x 21
Giant seated in a landscape	Aquatint	1814–18	28.4 x 20.8
If he is guilty, let him die quickly	Etching	c. 1815	11.7 x 8.5
The captivity is as barbarous as the crime	Etching and engraving	c. 1815	11 x 8.5
The custody of a criminal does not call for torture	Etching and engraving	c. 1815	11.4 x 8.8
Old fashioned duel	Lithograph	1819	12.1 x 21.5
An old woman spinning, spindle in her right hand, distaff in her left	Lithograph	1819	15.8 x 13
The Andalusian dance	Lithograph	c. 1820	18 x 18.1
Portrait of a young man	Lithograph	c. 1820	22.5 x 18.5
The printer Gaulon	Lithograph	1824–25	26.3 x 20.4
Woman reading to two children	Lithograph	1824–25	11.5 x 13
The blind singer	Etching, aquatint, drypoint and engraving	1824–28	19 x 12.2
Old man on a swing	Etching, aquatint and gouache	1826–28	18.8 x 12.1
Old woman on a swing	Etching	1826–28	18.8 x 12.1
Maja on dark background	Etching and aquatint	1826–28	19.1 x 12.2
Maja on light background	Etching and drypoint	1826–28	19.1 x 12.2
Andalusian smuggler	Etching, aquatint, drypoint and engraving	1826–28	19.1 x 12.2
The cloaked	Etching and drypoint	1826–28	19.1 x 12.2

== See also ==
- Francisco Goya's tapestry cartoons
- List of Francisco Goya's tapestry cartoons
- Black paintings
