= Dead Turkey =

Painting by Francisco Goya

- El Pavo muerto (Spanish)
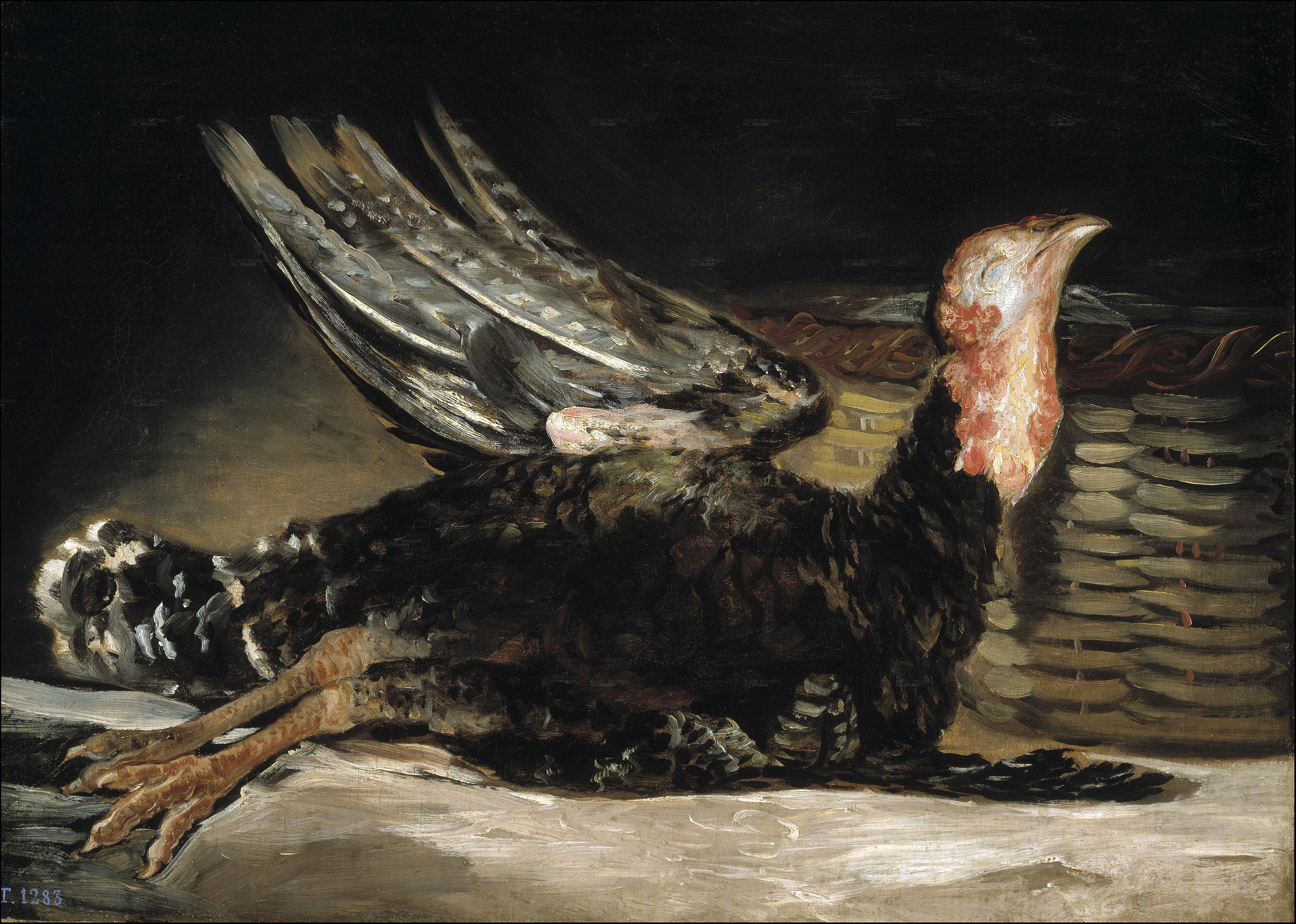
- Artist: Francisco de Goya
- Year: 1808–1812
- Medium: Oil on canvas
- Dimensions: 45 cm × 62 cm (18 in × 24 in)
- Location: Museo del Prado, Madrid

Dead Turkey (in Spanish: El Pavo muerto) is an oil on canvas painting by Francisco Goya. It forms a pair with Dead Birds, which it is exhibited also at the Prado Museum, in Madrid.

== Goya and still lifes ==
The still life was not a common theme in Goya's works; at the time the genre was less valued than portraits and religious or historic works. In 19th century Spain, the leading painters in this style were Luis Paret y Alcázar and Luis Meléndez. They worked in a Rococo style with a marked Realism and attention to detail. Goya painted a series of still lifes during the Spanish War of Independence (1807–1814) and later while exiled in Bordeaux. However, these works are far from the Rococo style, and are characterized by thick brush strokes and a limited color palette. Furthermore, Goya's still lifes deal starkly with death: the dead animals are treated as victims, their bodies depicted in a cruel and direct manner. It is impossible to determine the exact origin of this series of still lifes, but art historians place them between 1808 and 1812, due to their similarities with The Disasters of War, works from the same period that featured many violent scenes.

== Description ==
The still life is composes of a dead turkey leaned against a wicker basket, which is the sole spatial reference point. The background is dark and uniform, drawing the viewer's eye to the bird. Goya removes all affectation or idealization, placing the accent on light and color. The paint is applied with rapid brush strokes – each ridge of the basket is painted with one thick stroke. The palette is limited to four colors (ocher, white, black and red), with the red of the bird's head highlighted against the dark backdrop giving the work a dramatic realism.

Traditionally, paintings of birds were used to exemplify life, with rich colors creating a feeling of celebration. However, instead of these positive associations, Goya's work provokes a feeling closer to empathy. The limited number of elements concentrates the viewer on the recent death of the bird – something that has often been interpreted as a reference to the events of the War of Independence and its victims. The corpse-like rigidity of the raised wing and the joined feet augment the dramatic depth of the scene.

== See also ==
- List of works by Francisco Goya
