= Children in a Chariot =

Painting by Francisco de Goya

- Niños del carretón (Spanish)
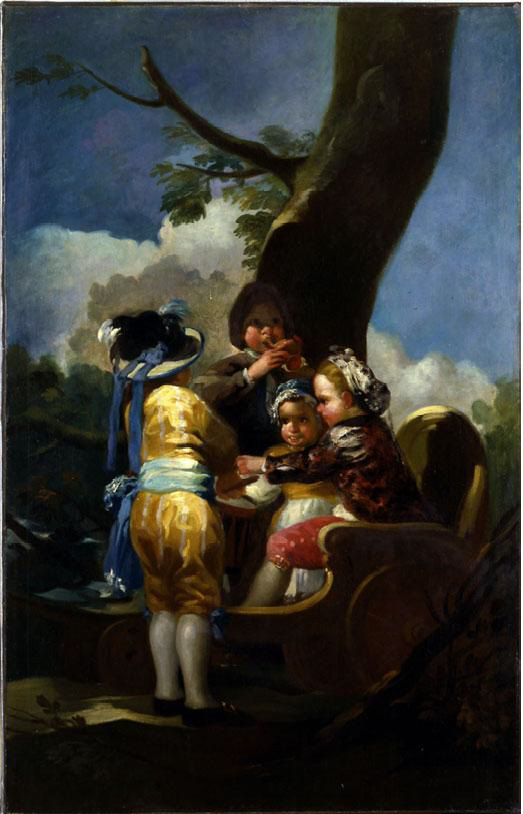
- Artist: Francisco Goya
- Year: 1779
- Medium: oil on canvas
- Dimensions: 145.4 cm × 94 cm (57.2 in × 37 in)
- Location: Toledo Museum of Art, Toledo

Children in a Chariot (Spanish - Niños del carretón) is a 1779 painting by Francisco de Goya. It is part of the third series of cartoons he produced for tapestries at the Royal Palace of El Pardo; the tapestry in question was to be positioned over a door. The painting is in the Toledo Museum of Art, in Toledo, Ohio.

== See also ==
- List of works by Francisco Goya

== Bibliography ==
- Cruzada Villaamil, Gregorio (1870). Los tapices de Goya (in Spanish). Rivadeneyra. OCLC 27205287.
- de Sambricio, V. (1946). Tapices de Goya (in Spanish). Madrid: Patrimonio Nacional. pp. 111, 227.
- Arnaiz, José Manuel (1987). Francisco de Goya: cartones y tapices (in Spanish). Madrid: Espasa-Calpe. pp. 60, 93, 101, 269.
- Tomlinson, Janis (1993). Francisco de Goya: los cartones para tapices y los comienzos de su carrera en la corte de Madrid (in Spanish). Madrid: Cátedra. pp. 117–119. ISBN 9788437603926.
- Bozal, Valeriano (2005). Francisco Goya: vida y obra (in Spanish). TF Editores & Interactiva. ISBN 978-84-96209-39-8.
- Laurent, Jean (1899). Catalogue illustré des tableaux du Musée du Prado à Madrid (in French). J. Laurent et Cie.
- Águeda, Mercedes (2003). Cartas a Martín Zapater (in Spanish). Ediciones AKAL. ISBN 978-84-7090-399-1.
- Juan J. Luna; et al. (1996). Goya, 250 aniversario (in Spanish). Musée du Prado. ISBN 84-87317-48-0.
