= The Incantation (Goya) =

Painting by Francisco Goya

- Spanish: El conjuro
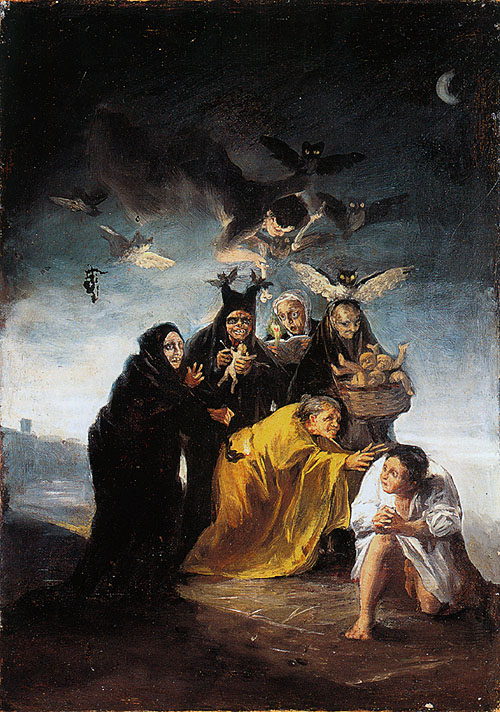
- Artist: Francisco Goya
- Year: 1797–1798
- Medium: oil on plain weave
- Dimensions: 43.5 × 30.5 cm
- Location: Lázaro Galdiano Museum, Madrid

The Incantation (Spanish: El conjuro) is a painting by the Spanish artist Francisco Goya. It belongs to a series of six cabinet paintings, each approximately 43 × 30 cm, with witchcraft as the central theme. The paintings do not form a single narrative and have no shared meaning, so each one is interpreted individually. The entire series was owned by the Dukes of Osuna and adorned their summer residence in Alameda de Osuna. In addition to The Incantation, the series includes Witches' Sabbath, Witches' Flight, Don Juan and the Commendatore, The Bewitched Man, and The Witches' Kitchen. Four of the paintings are held in various public collections, one in a private collection, and the last is considered lost.

== Circumstances of creation ==
=== Patronage of the Dukes of Osuna ===
In the early stages of his career in Madrid, Goya primarily worked for the Royal Tapestry Factory while simultaneously expanding his private clientele among the capital's aristocracy and bourgeoisie. Significant patrons of the painter became the Dukes of Osuna: Pedro Téllez-Girón and his wife María Josefa Pimentel. They were part of the intellectual elite and leading figures of the Spanish Enlightenment. Together, they organized discussion evenings that featured prominent "Enlightened". They actively supported culture, amassed an impressive library, and hosted theatrical performances in their residence. They extended their patronage to scientists and artists of the era, including Goya and Leandro Fernández de Moratín. Between 1785 and 1817, Goya painted around 30 works for them – portraits of the patrons and their children, religious scenes, and cabinet paintings. They also acquired the first editions of engravings from the Los caprichos series. After the duke's death in 1807, the painter continued to work for the duchess, including portraits of their adult daughters and sons.

=== Alameda de Osuna ===
In 1783, the Duke of Osuna acquired land and buildings in the northeastern Madrid locality of La Alameda, where wealthy families spent their summers, escaping the hustle of the city. Numerous development projects commissioned and implemented by the duke transformed the town, which soon changed its name to La Alameda de Osuna. By 1792, the duke's estate included a palace, and at the duchess' initiative, gardens known as El Capricho were also established. The Duke of Osuna purchased a cycle of six small-sized paintings from Goya to decorate the new palace. A bill sent to the duke dated 27 June 1798 for "six works on the theme of witches", totaling 6,000 reales, has been preserved.

It is often assumed that the paintings were created at the duchess' direct request; however, there is no evidence to support this. It is possible that Goya presented completed works to his patrons that suited their tastes. For this reason, it is difficult to determine whether the painter created them with a specific room in mind or if their placement was decided later. It is known that the paintings hung on the first floor in the hallway leading to the duchess' study, which was called the gabinete de países. Art historian Frank Irving Heckes believed that this room housed the duke's library, which is why Goya intentionally included literary motifs in his compositions. María Isabel Pérez Hernández, who analyzed the inventory of goods compiled in 1834 after the duchess' death, stated that Goya's paintings were then in the hallway of the gabinete de países, but the remaining furniture and items in that room did not indicate that it served as a library. Goya's works, along with engravings, were moved there only around 1845.

Witchcraft series

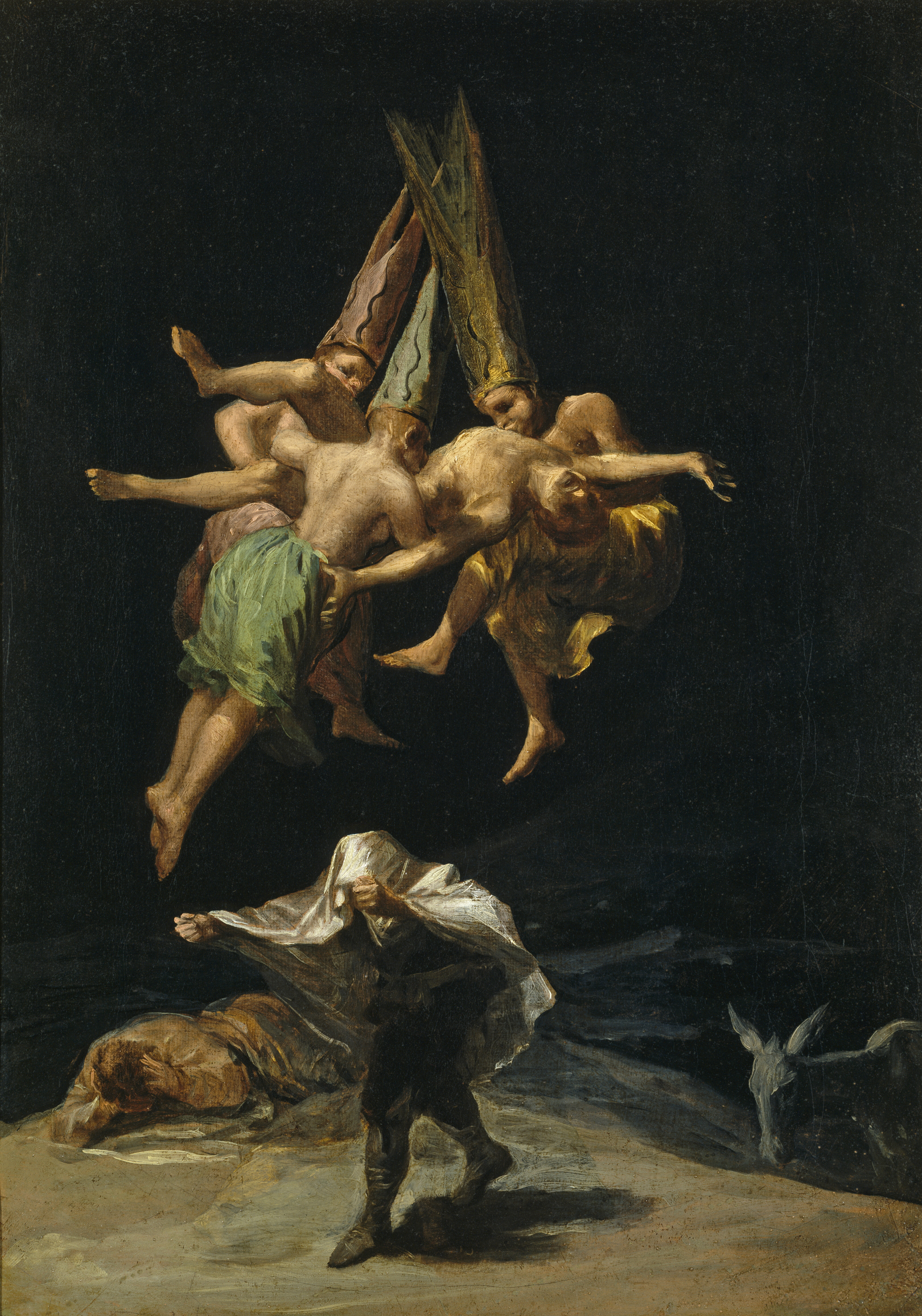
Witches' Flight

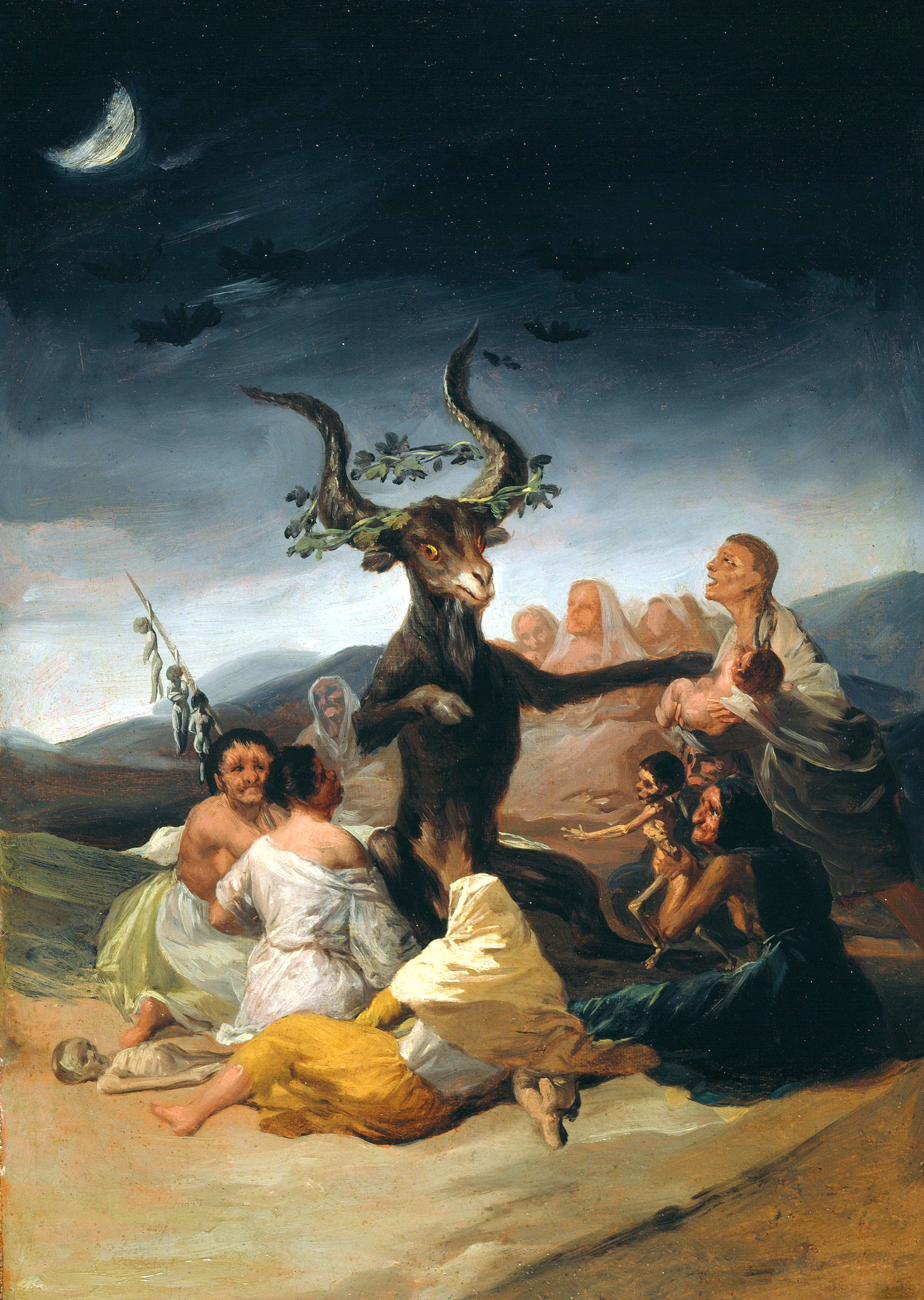
Witches' Sabbath

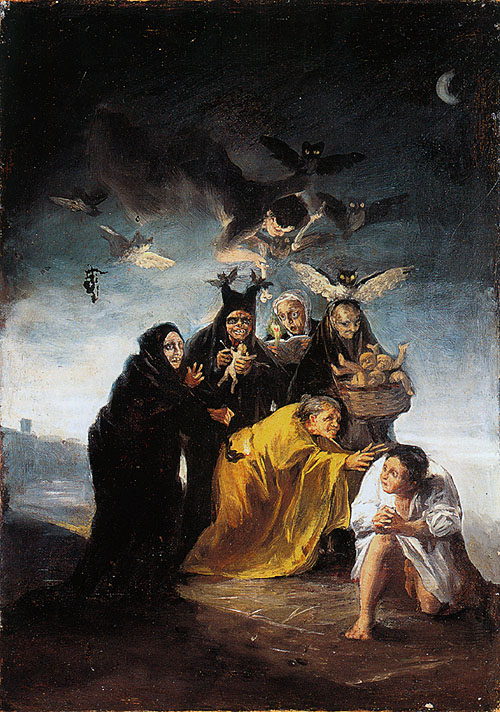
The Incantation

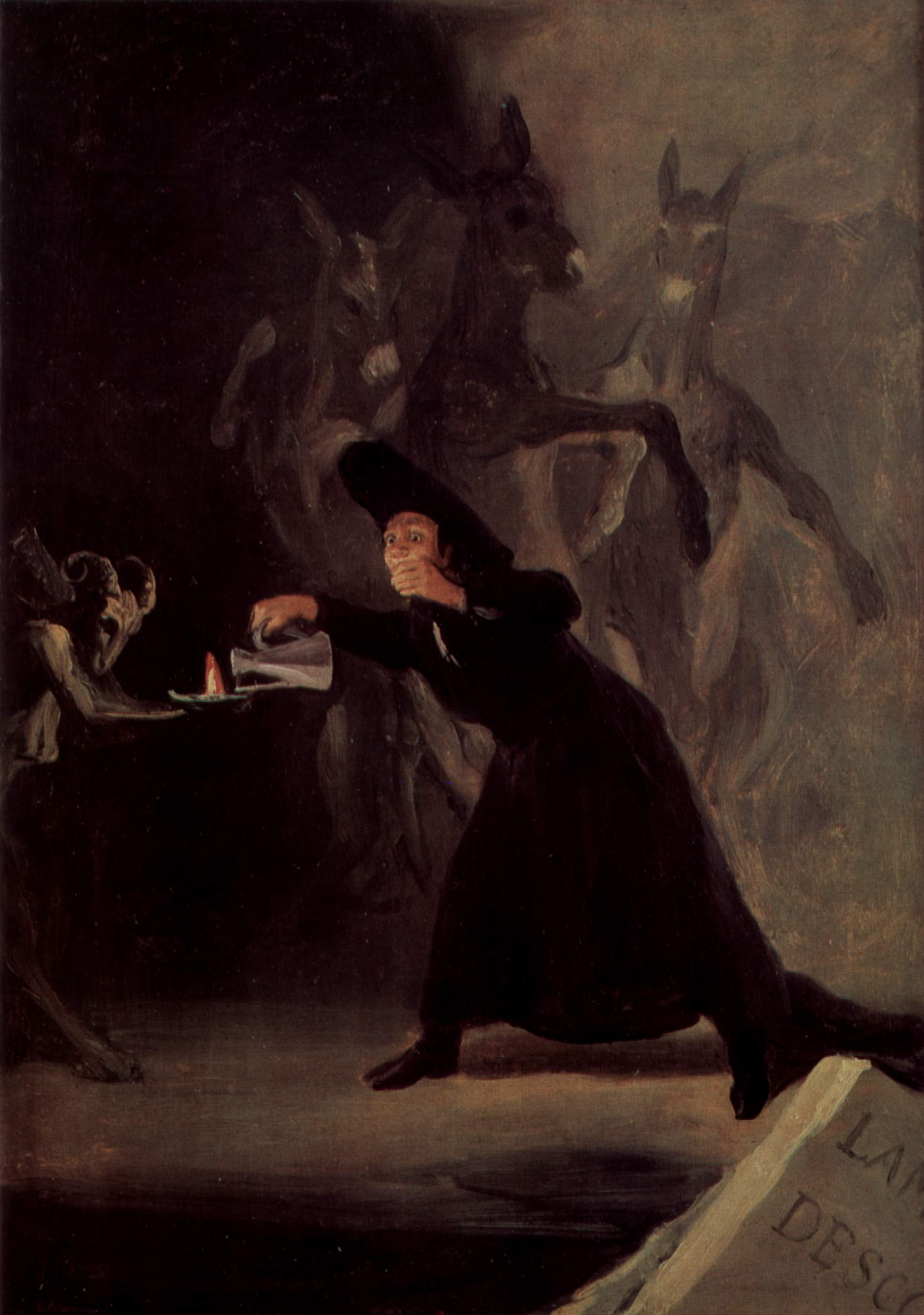
The Bewitched Man

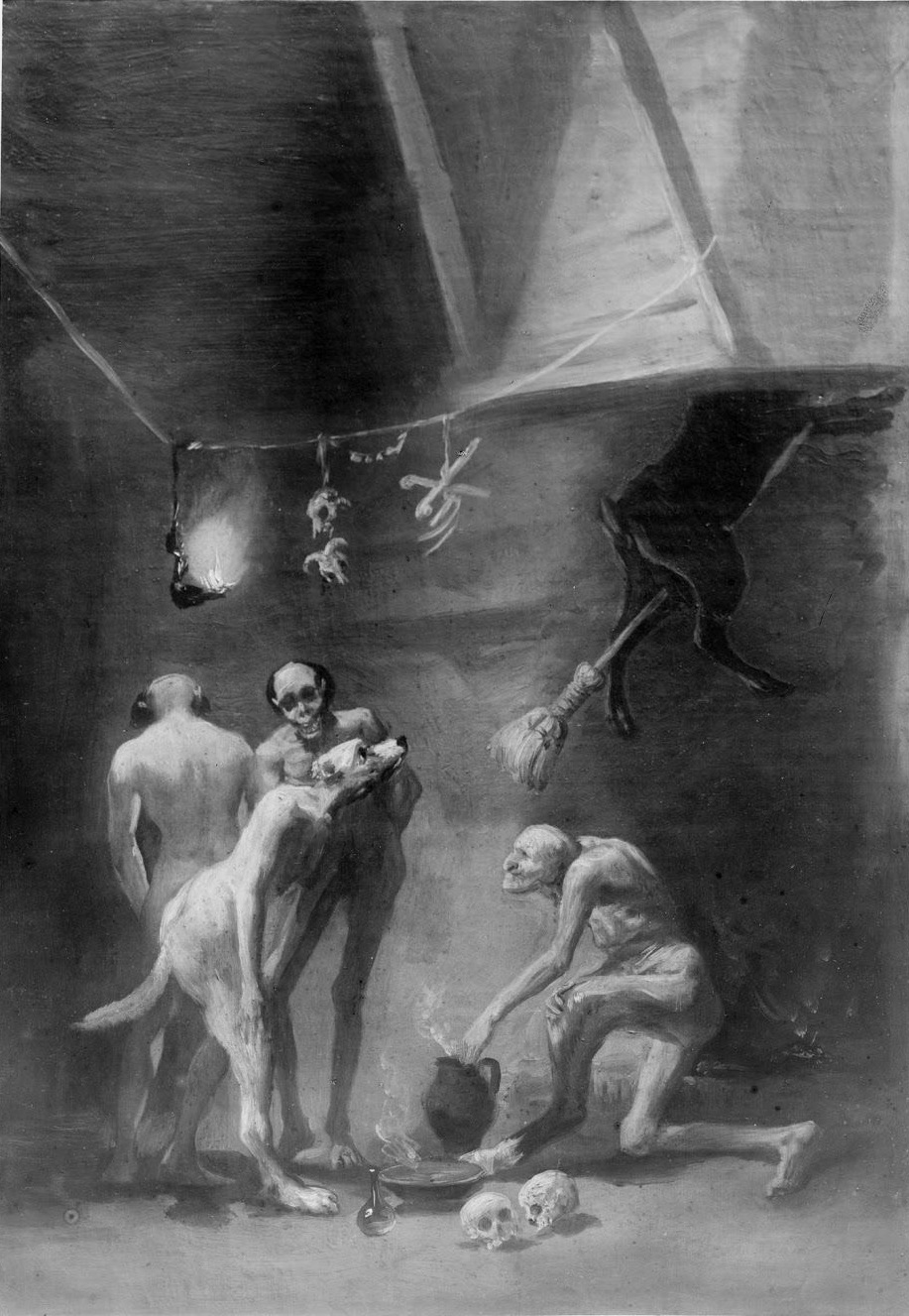
The Witches' Kitchen

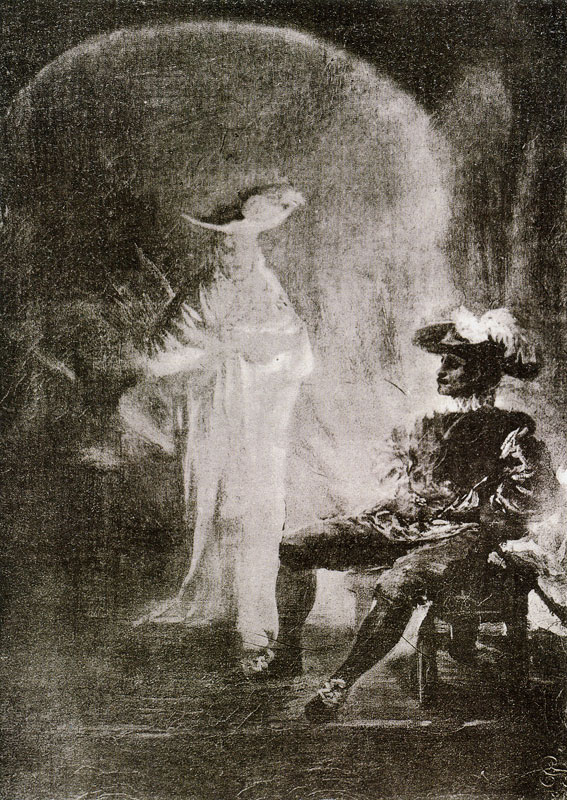
Don Juan and the Commendatore

=== Witches and sorcery ===
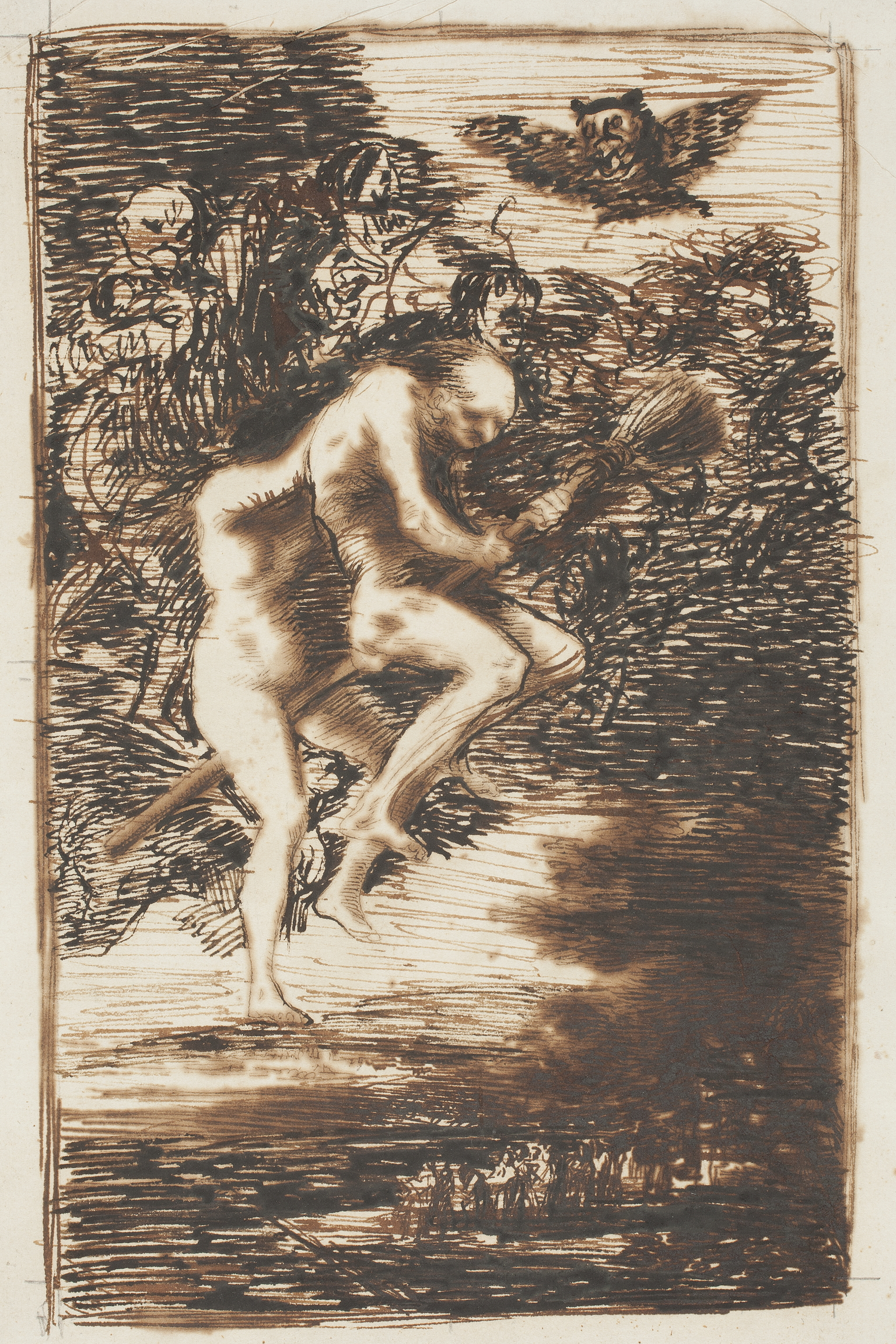
Drawing from the collection Dreams depicting witches, circa 1797

The subjects of the works were witches and sorcery, which were important elements of Spanish folklore. Popular belief in witchcraft and demons was widespread, and the inquiries and punishments of the Inquisition further invigorated and legitimized these superstitions. This popular motif appeared in art, literature, and theater, often in the form of satire. Goya was inspired by the theatrical works of Antonio de Zamora, which he could have seen in the private theater of the dukes. The enlightened nobility (the so-called ilustrados), to which the Dukes of Osuna belonged, did not believe in witchcraft; however, they were fascinated by the theme of sorcery, supernatural phenomena, and the associated plebeian culture. The dukes' library contained books on magic (including Malleus Maleficarum and Le Diable boiteux), for which they had special permission from the Holy Office. The duchess' mother was passionate about esotericism and novels such as William Beckford's Vathek. Many of Goya's enlightened friends were members of the Freemasonry.

The theme of witchcraft had a similar effect on Goya, who declared disbelief in witches and considered himself a skeptic, (Note: In a letter to his friend Martín Zapater, Goya writes: "I am not afraid of witches, devils, ghosts, boastful giants, rogues, scoundrels, and so on. None of these beings, in fact, are anything but human beings".) yet his works often featured demons and fantastic figures. It is unclear whether the Duchess of Osuna suggested the themes of the paintings to Goya or if they originated from his own invention. It is possible that when Goya was working on the portrait General Jose de Urrutia commissioned by the dukes, he had the opportunity to show the duchess drawings from the collection titled Dreams, where he addressed the theme of witchcraft to inspire her.

=== Dating ===
The paintings were most likely created between 1797 and 1798, but no later than the date on the invoice (27 June 1798). There are numerous thematic and compositional similarities to the series of engravings Los caprichos, which Goya was working on at the same time. Los caprichos served as a satire on Spanish society and a critique of religious fanaticism, the Inquisition, and superstitions. Josep Gudiol dated the Witches series to between 1794 and 1795, which coincided with the period of the painter's recovery after a severe illness that left him completely deaf between 1792 and 1793. Gradually returning to work, Goya focused on painting smaller works that required less physical effort. He also increasingly painted compositions dictated by his own imagination, avoiding existing patterns and free from generally accepted canons. According to art historian José Luis Morales y Marín, this series was exhibited by Goya at the Real Academia de Bellas Artes de San Fernando in 1799 as "six strange caprices". The dukes likely borrowed the paintings from Goya, possibly to help promote Los caprichos, which were published in the same year.

== Interpretation ==
The scene depicts a group of five old witches performing a spell at night by the pale light of the moon. The rising moon marks the beginning of the night. The last light of day falls on the horizon, where the outline of a village is visible. The appearance of the witches is terrifying. Some have skull-like faces, with flat foreheads and sharp teeth showing in malicious smiles. Four witches are dressed in black like devil’s priestesses, one wears a yellowish outfit typical for procuresses, and the figure in white is their victim, surrounded.

The first witch on the left holds a lantern and counts to three on her fingers, referring to the kidnapped infants in the basket carried by another witch. The next one holds a small baby or a wax doll, which she pierces with pins. She wears a black two-pointed hat adorned with small bats at each end, or the bats cling to the folds of her cloak, giving it the shape of a satanic mitre.

The third witch, with a white scarf on her head, reads a spell or sings from a book illuminated by a candle, like a church missal. A demonic figure flying just above the witches’ heads accompanies her with a macabre sound, beating bones held in its hands. It descends from the sky like an angel, its limbs fading into the darkness. It could be the devil himself or Saturn, the master of witches and all nocturnal creatures, death, or the "queen of the sabbath". The witch on the right holds a basket with three crying infants, raising their hands in plea. Both the flame of the lantern and the sound of the bones may symbolize the imminent death of the children. A large owl pulls the scarf from the witch’s head, revealing baldness, which in the painter’s time was a sign of syphilis, associated with prostitution. Other owls and bats (animals believed to drink blood) hover in the air, their eyes gleaming in the darkness.

On the ground, the fifth witch – a procuress in a yellowish outfit – reaches out to the terrified younger figure, whether man or woman (the gender is ambiguous). Through gestures and deceitful words, she tries to ensnare the superstitious person and lure them with promises. It seems the witches’ victim has been woken in the middle of the night and dragged out of bed. Dressed only in a white nightshirt, the figure appears hypnotized by fear, kneeling on the ground with clasped hands and eyes wide with terror; it may be a gesture of begging for mercy. In the 18th century, it was believed that witches’ flights and other spells occurred in the dreams and imagination of women, not in reality. This may be why the figure is depicted in a nightshirt, similar to some women in the painting Witches' Sabbath.

Fantasy and reality intermingle in the painting: the witches and their winged companions belong to an imaginary world, while the reality is represented by the crouching figure in the foreground. The group of black witches has a more devilish appearance, while the one in yellow seems more human. The composition focuses on this figure and its victim in the white shirt. It is possible that the painting depicts a theatrical scene, with the two main figures in yellow and white, and the four witches in supporting roles. The painting is very dark, especially the lower left corner, which is almost entirely occupied by a black triangle. Only the central part, where the witches are, is illuminated. The arrangement of the figures is also typical for the theatre; for instance, none of them have their backs turned. The kneeling figure, who should be facing the witches, looks partly ahead, merely turning its head in their direction.

According to Manuela Mena, the witches’ scene primarily serves to point out the real causes of children’s deaths. Contrary to superstitions, it is not witches who kidnap and kill them, but venereal diseases, the main cause of which was prostitution. According to Frank Irving, the theme of this painting has its origins in literature. It may reference the auto-da-fé of 1610 carried out in Logroño and described in the Relation of the Burning at the Stake of Logroño. Goya’s friend, playwright Leandro Fernández de Moratín, wrote a satirical and critical commentary on this account. He began working on it in 1797 and published it together with the original in 1812. In this work, a feud between two witches, one of whom took revenge on the other, is described. With the help of the devil and other witches, Graciana woke her rival Marijuana in the middle of the night and poisoned her. According to Irving, these characters are the women in the yellow and white outfits.

== Technique ==
The composition of this painting is shaped like a hexagram, with its center located at the group of main figures and the peak at the head of the flying man. This composition, also used in The Witches' Kitchen, resembles the Seal of Solomon, a magical symbol used in witchcraft both to summon the devil and to cast a spell on enemies.

Dark colors dominate, interrupted by bright, luminous blues. The dramatic effect of this composition was enhanced by Goya’s use of color: starting with a layer of black paint that covered the entire canvas, he applied colors in a way that created bright areas while preserving the blackness of the background.

== Provenance ==
The estate of the Dukes of Osuna was largely squandered by their heirs, especially the 12th Duke of Osuna, Mariano Téllez-Girón. In 1896, a public auction was held in Madrid for the family’s estate and art collection. The paintings from the Witchcraft series were then sold to various owners. The Incantation and Witches' Sabbath belonged to Rodrigo Figueroa y Torres, 1st Duke de Tovar, from whom José Lázaro Galdiano purchased them in 1928.

== Bibliography ==
- Hughes, Robert (2006). Goya: artysta i jego czas [Goya: The Artist and His Time] (in Polish). Warsaw: W.A.B. ISBN 978-83-7414-248-9. OCLC 569990350.
- Mena, Manuela; Wilson–Bareau, Juliet (1993). Goya: el capricho y la invención: cuadros de gabinete, bocetos y miniaturas [Goya: The Whim and Invention: Cabinet Paintings, Sketches, and Miniatures] (in Spanish). Madrid: Museo del Prado. ISBN 84-87317-24-3.
