= Don Juan and the Commendatore =

Painting by Francisco Goya

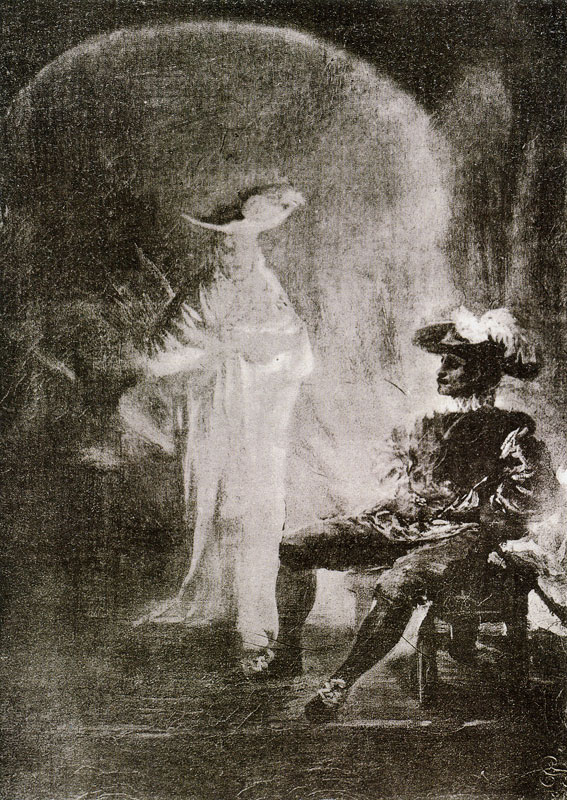
- Artist: Francisco Goya
- Year: 1797–1798
- Medium: oil on plain weave
- Dimensions: 45 × 32 cm

Don Juan and the Commendatore (Spanish: Don Juan y la estatua del Comendador or El burlador de Sevilla) is a painting by the Spanish artist Francisco Goya. It belongs to a series of six cabinet paintings, each approximately 43 × 30 cm, with witchcraft as the central theme. The paintings do not form a single narrative and have no shared meaning, so each one is interpreted individually. The entire series was owned by the Dukes of Osuna and adorned their summer residence in Alameda de Osuna. In addition to Don Juan and the Commendatore, the series includes Witches' Sabbath, Witches' Flight, The Incantation, The Bewitched Man, and The Witches' Kitchen. Four of these paintings are housed in various public collections, one in a private collection, and Don Juan and the Commendatore is considered lost.

== Circumstances of creation ==
=== Patronage of the Dukes of Osuna ===
In the early stages of his career in Madrid, Goya primarily worked for the Royal Tapestry Factory while simultaneously expanding his private clientele among the capital's aristocracy and bourgeoisie. Significant patrons of the painter became the Dukes of Osuna: Pedro Téllez-Girón and his wife María Josefa Pimentel. They were part of the intellectual elite and leading figures of the Spanish Enlightenment. Together, they organized discussion evenings that featured prominent "Enlightened". They actively supported culture, amassed an impressive library, and hosted theatrical performances in their residence. They extended their patronage to scientists and artists of the era, including Goya and Leandro Fernández de Moratín. Between 1785 and 1817, Goya painted around 30 works for them – portraits of the patrons and their children, religious scenes, and cabinet paintings. They also acquired the first editions of engravings from the Los caprichos series. After the duke's death in 1807, the painter continued to work for the duchess, including portraits of their adult daughters and sons.

=== Alameda de Osuna ===
In 1783, the Duke of Osuna acquired land and buildings in the northeastern Madrid locality of La Alameda, where wealthy families spent their summers, escaping the hustle of the city. Numerous development projects commissioned and implemented by the duke transformed the town, which soon changed its name to La Alameda de Osuna. By 1792, the duke's estate included a palace, and at the duchess' initiative, gardens known as El Capricho were also established. The Duke of Osuna purchased a cycle of six small-sized paintings from Goya to decorate the new palace. A bill sent to the duke dated 27 June 1798 for "six works on the theme of witches", totaling 6,000 reales, has been preserved.

It is often assumed that the paintings were created at the duchess' direct request; however, there is no evidence to support this. It is possible that Goya presented completed works to his patrons that suited their tastes. For this reason, it is difficult to determine whether the painter created them with a specific room in mind or if their placement was decided later. It is known that the paintings hung on the first floor in the hallway leading to the duchess' study, which was called the gabinete de países. Art historian Frank Irving Heckes believed that this room housed the duke's library, which is why Goya intentionally included literary motifs in his compositions. María Isabel Pérez Hernández, who analyzed the inventory of goods compiled in 1834 after the duchess' death, stated that Goya's paintings were then in the hallway of the gabinete de países, but the remaining furniture and items in that room did not indicate that it served as a library. Goya's works, along with engravings, were moved there only around 1845.

Witchcraft series

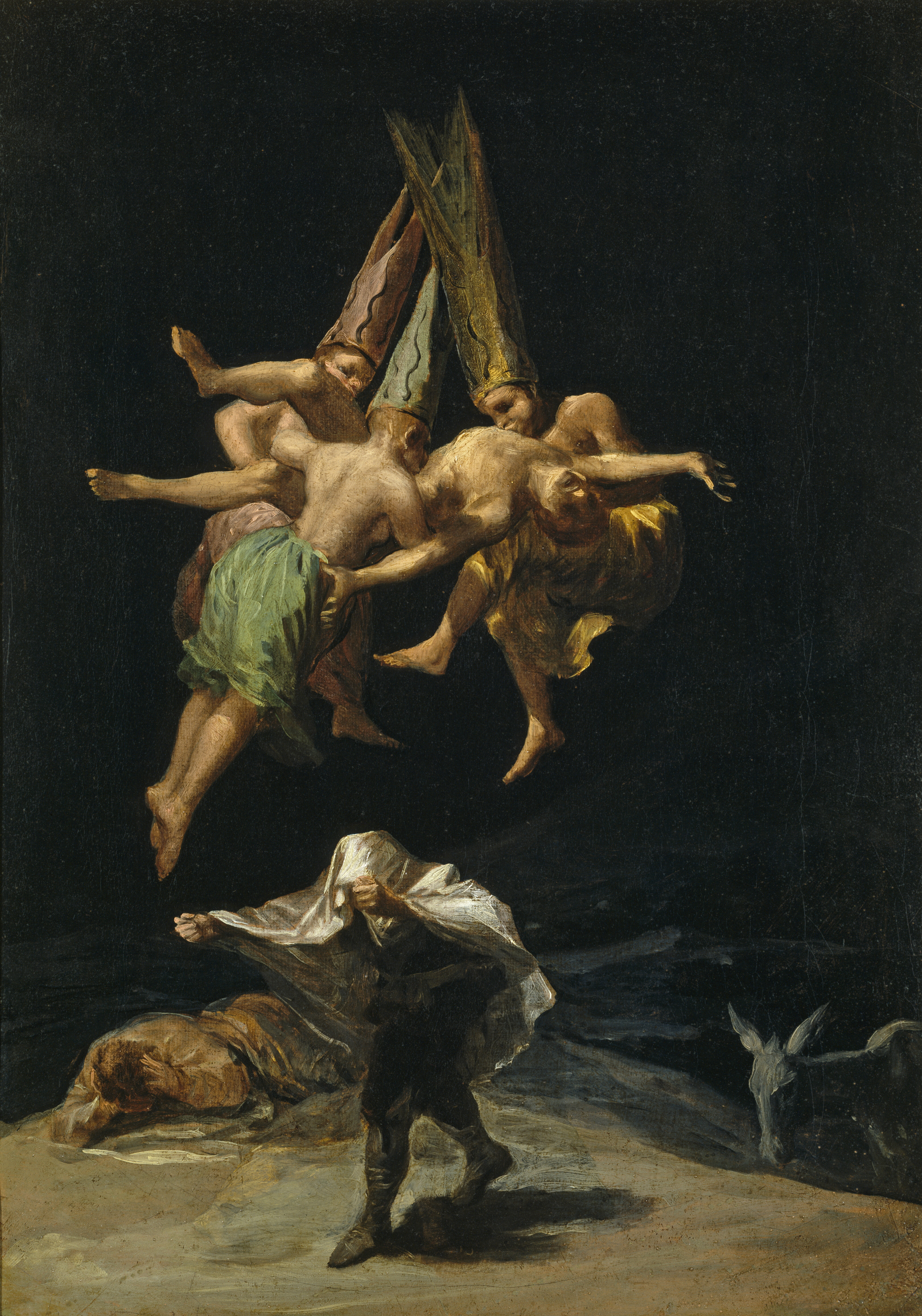
Witches' Flight

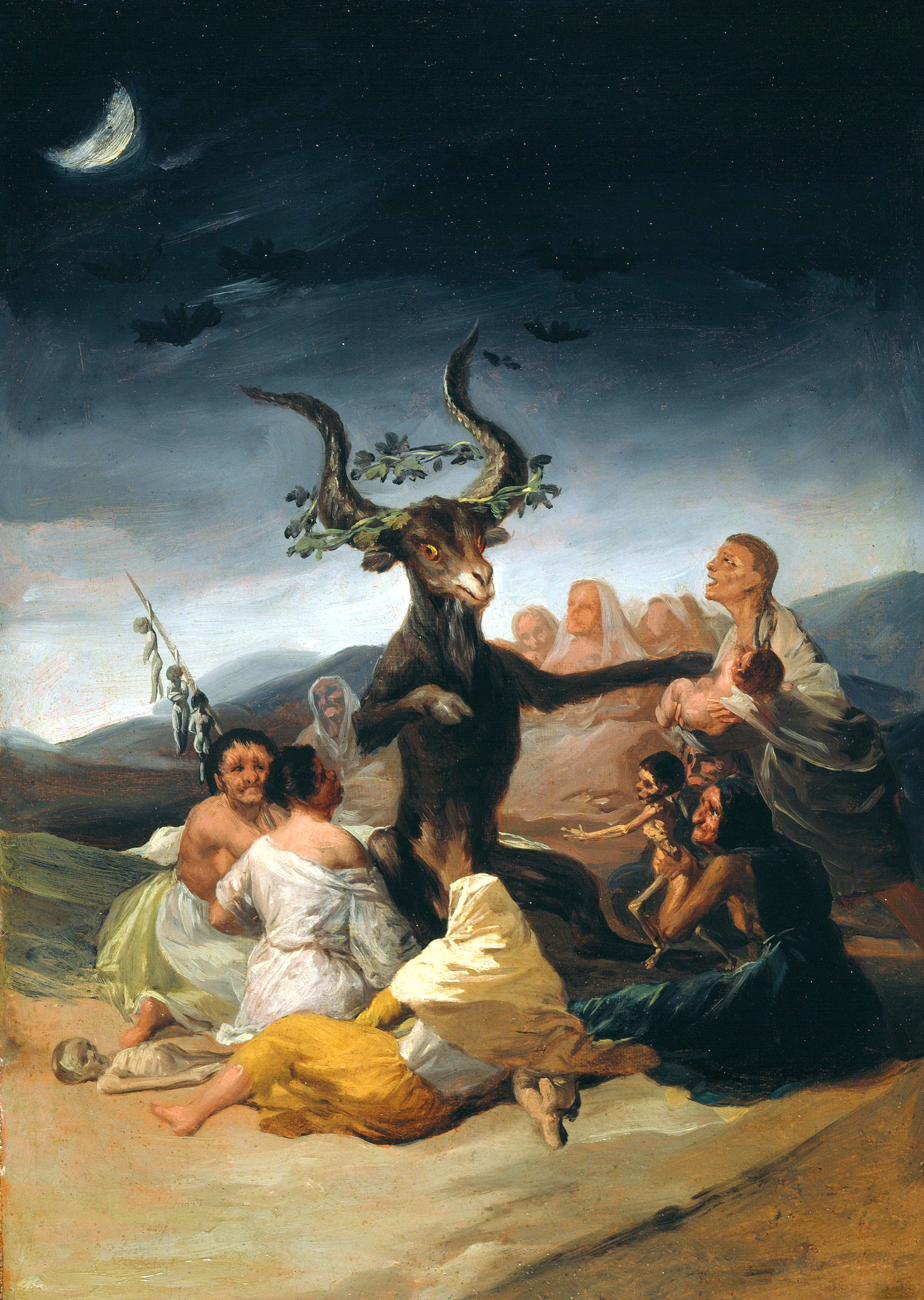
Witches' Sabbath

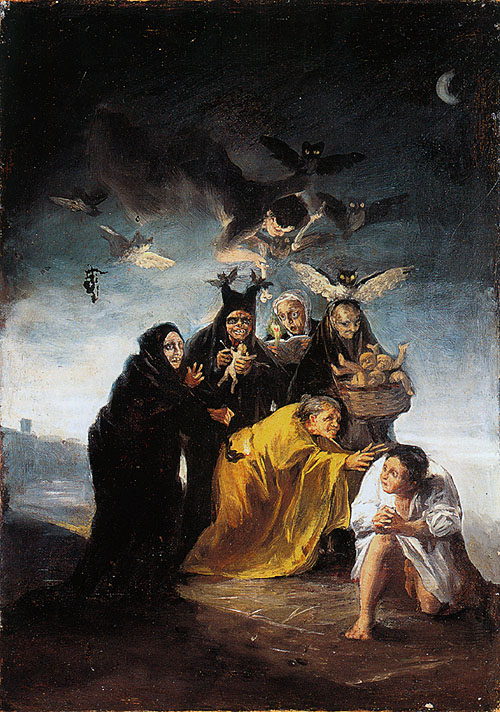
The Incantation

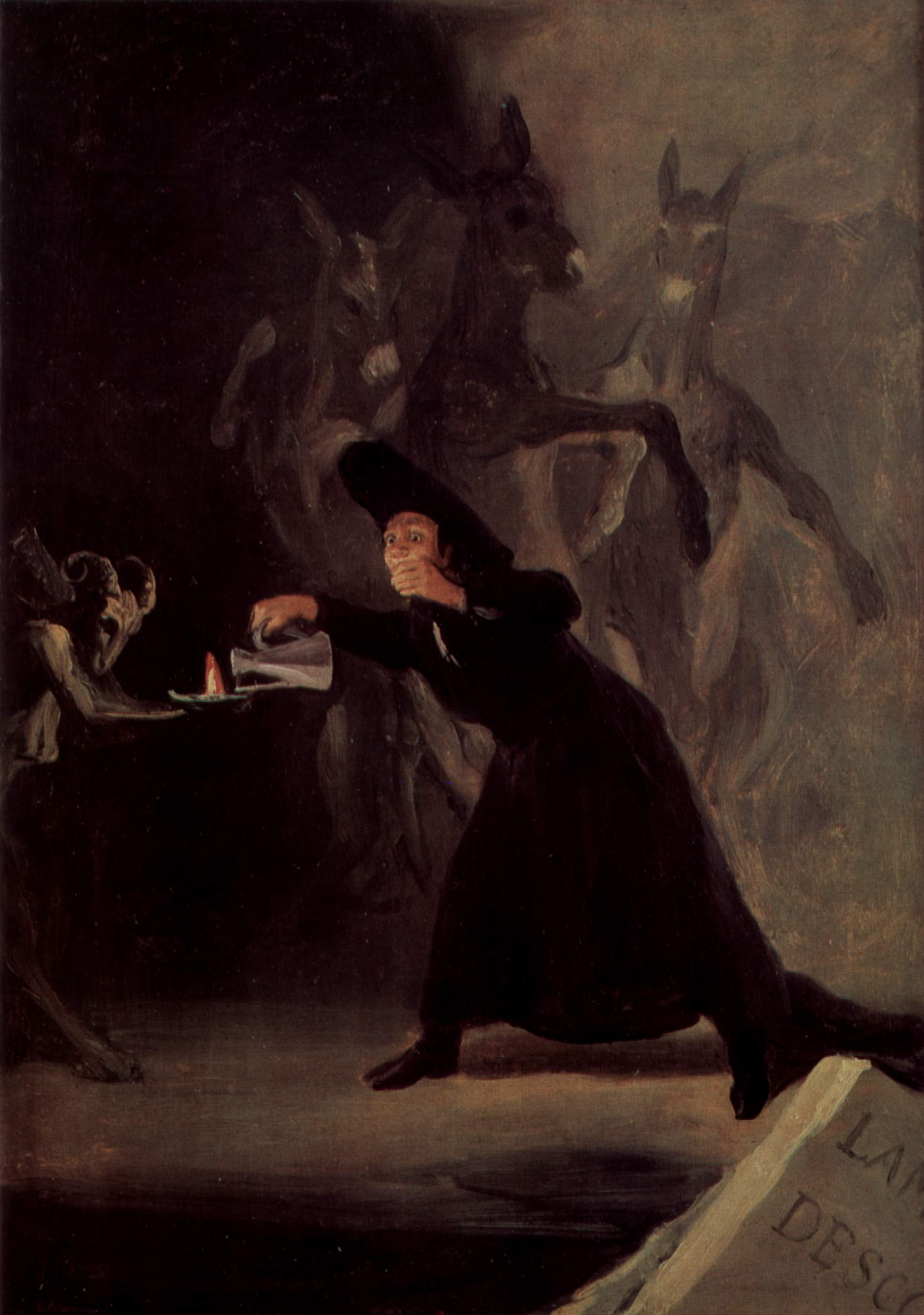
The Bewitched Man

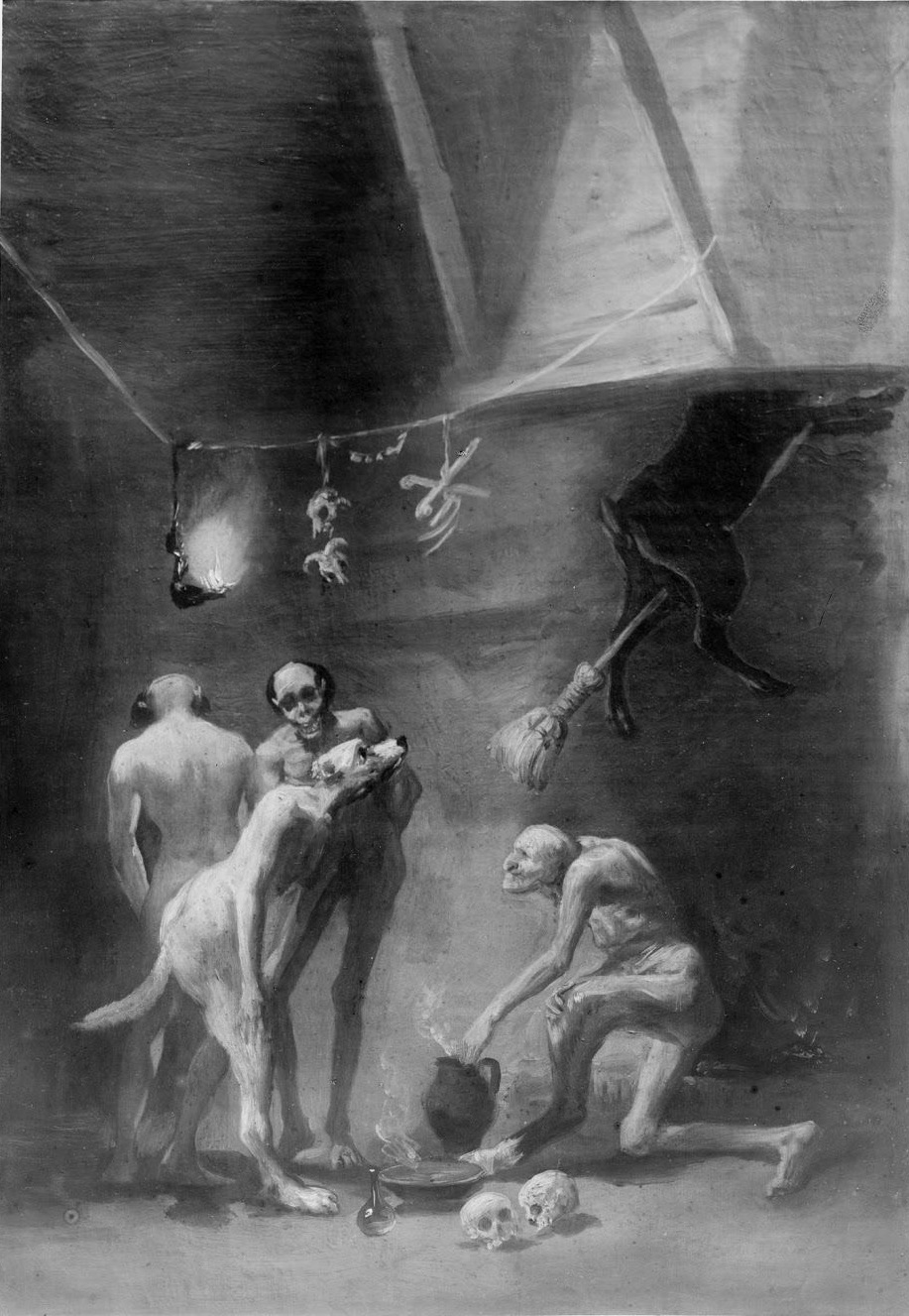
The Witches' Kitchen

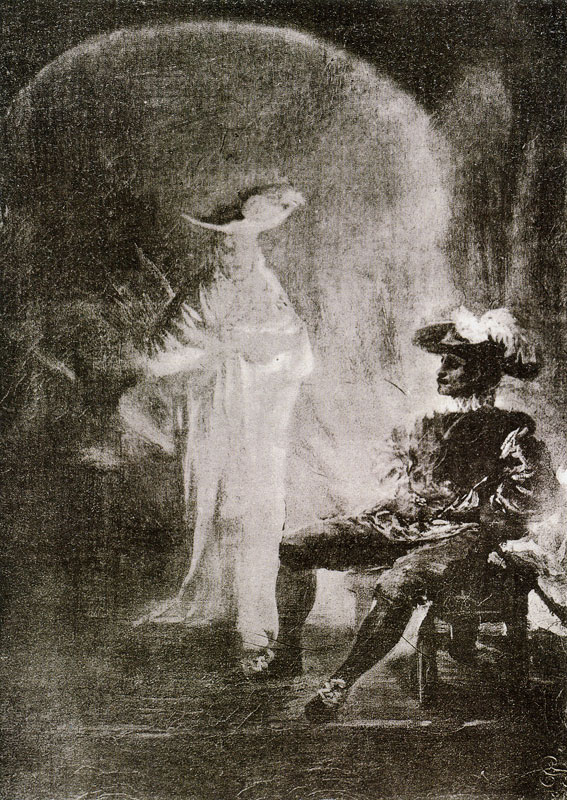
Don Juan and the Commendatore

=== Witches and sorcery ===
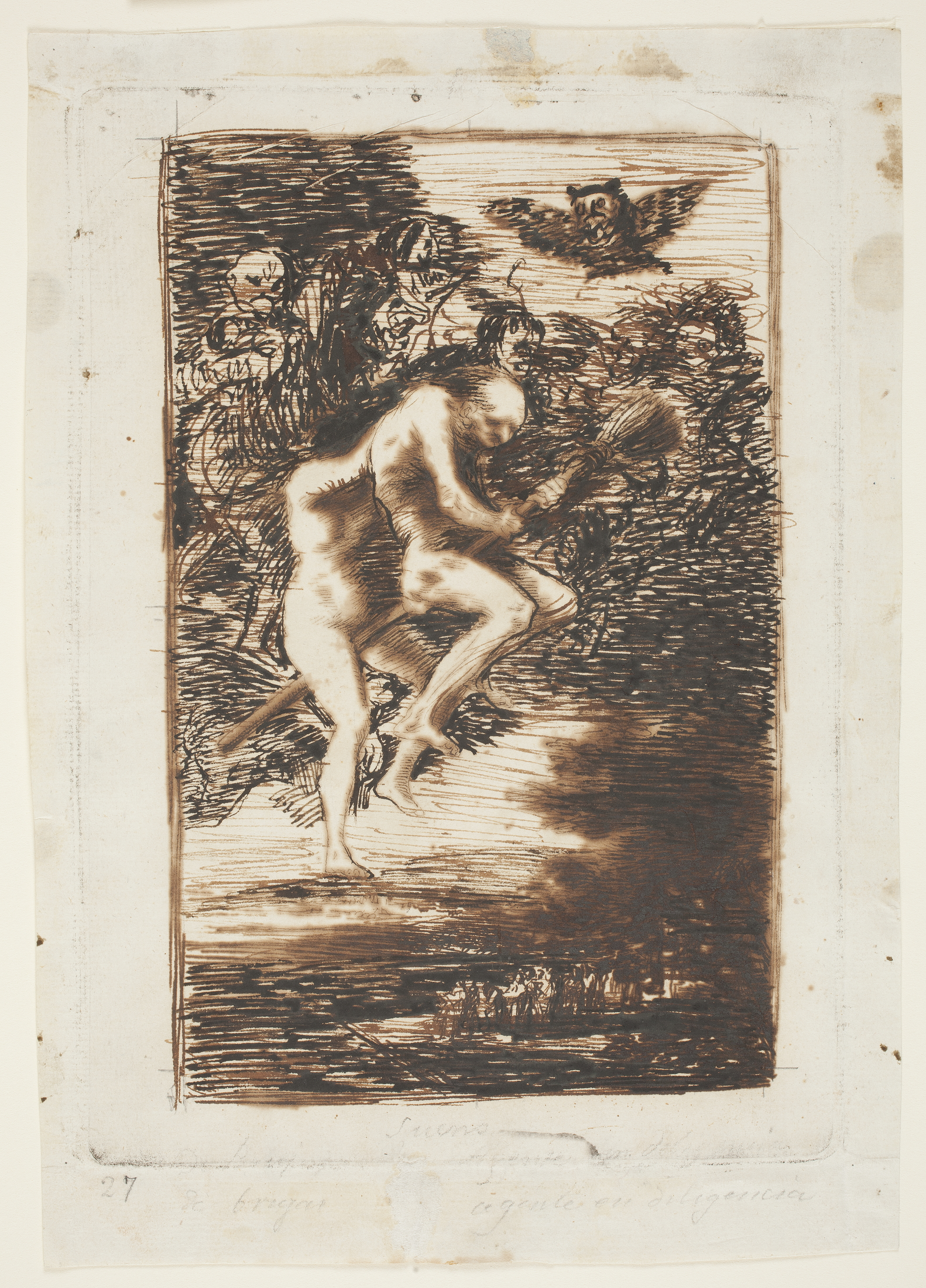
Drawing from the collection Dreams depicting witches, circa 1797

The subjects of the works were witches and sorcery, which were important elements of Spanish folklore. Popular belief in witchcraft and demons was widespread, and the inquiries and punishments of the Inquisition further invigorated and legitimized these superstitions. This popular motif appeared in art, literature, and theater, often in the form of satire. Goya was inspired by the theatrical works of Antonio de Zamora, which he could have seen in the private theater of the dukes. The enlightened nobility (the so-called ilustrados), to which the Dukes of Osuna belonged, did not believe in witchcraft; however, they were fascinated by the theme of sorcery, supernatural phenomena, and the associated plebeian culture. The dukes' library contained books on magic (including Malleus Maleficarum and Le Diable boiteux), for which they had special permission from the Holy Office. The duchess' mother was passionate about esotericism and novels such as William Beckford's Vathek. Many of Goya's enlightened friends were members of the Freemasonry.

The theme of witchcraft had a similar effect on Goya, who declared disbelief in witches and considered himself a skeptic, (Note: In a letter to his friend Martín Zapater, Goya writes: "I am not afraid of witches, devils, ghosts, boastful giants, rogues, scoundrels, and so on. None of these beings, in fact, are anything but human beings" (Hughes (2006, p. 148)).) yet his works often featured demons and fantastic figures. It is unclear whether the Duchess of Osuna suggested the themes of the paintings to Goya or if they originated from his own invention. It is possible that when Goya was working on the portrait General Jose de Urrutia commissioned by the dukes, he had the opportunity to show the duchess drawings from the collection titled Dreams, where he addressed the theme of witchcraft to inspire her.

=== Dating ===
The paintings were most likely created between 1797 and 1798, but no later than the date on the invoice (27 June 1798). There are numerous thematic and compositional similarities to the series of engravings Los caprichos, which Goya was working on at the same time. Los caprichos served as a satire on Spanish society and a critique of religious fanaticism, the Inquisition, and superstitions. Josep Gudiol dated the Witches series to between 1794 and 1795, which coincided with the period of the painter's recovery after a severe illness that left him completely deaf between 1792 and 1793. Gradually returning to work, Goya focused on painting smaller works that required less physical effort. He also increasingly painted compositions dictated by his own imagination, avoiding existing patterns and free from generally accepted canons. According to art historian José Luis Morales y Marín, this series was exhibited by Goya at the Real Academia de Bellas Artes de San Fernando in 1799 as "six strange caprices". The dukes likely borrowed the paintings from Goya, possibly to help promote Los caprichos, which were published in the same year.

== Interpretation ==
Goya draws inspiration from the works of Antonio de Zamora (1660–1727), a Spanish poet and playwright whose works remained popular during Goya’s lifetime and gained particular recognition in the 19th century. Zamora adhered to Spanish traditions, resisting the influence of contemporary French literature and character comedies. Goya sought inspiration in typically Spanish motifs, despite having access to more popular works. The painting depicts a scene from Act III of Zamora's comedy, which is a reinterpretation of The Trickster of Seville and the Stone Guest by Tirso de Molina, a retelling of the Don Juan legend. Zamora’s play was a success, performed annually in Madrid between 1784 and 1804. Leandro Moratín, familiar with this version of the legend, might have recommended it to Goya as a subject for a painting. Alternatively, the theater-loving Goya may have seen the play and selected this scene himself.

In the play, Don Juan kills Commander Gonzalo de Ulloa and later invites the Commander’s statue to dine with him, which the statue accepts, leading to a fateful encounter in the pantheon of the Ulloa family – represented in the painting. In the background, Goya painted an arch reminiscent of the Ulloa family chapel, beneath which, at the top of the stairs, the stone figure of the Commander appears. Wrapped in a shroud and bathed in a bright light that illuminates the confined space, the Commander approaches Don Juan. The shroud bears the Cross of Saint James. Don Juan, seated in a chair with flames rising behind him, seems unaware of the Commander’s presence. His arrogant posture, hands on his hips, and sword at his side reflect his defiance. He wears a 16th-century knight’s attire, complete with a broad-brimmed hat adorned with feathers. Goya captures the tense moment just before the dramatic climax. Don Juan, unrepentant, will be punished with hell, symbolized by the flames. The relationship between the characters and Don Juan’s carefree demeanor recalls Goya’s earlier painting Hercules and Omphale, painted about 15 years earlier. Art historian Josep Gudiol considers Don Juan and the Commendatore a manifestation of Goya’s pre-Romantic style.

Don Juan’s figure might also portray an actor from Goya’s time, as leading roles were often played by Manuel García Parra or Manuel de la Prada, actors specializing in plays on magical themes. This painting diverges the most from the theme of the series. It does not address the contrast between reality and imagination nor critique superstitions, instead focusing on the consequences of sin. Art historian Frank Irving Heckes believed this painting was the last one created and thus concludes the series.

== Provenance ==
The Dukes of Osuna's fortune was largely squandered by their heirs, particularly by the 12th Duke of Osuna, Mariano Téllez-Girón. In 1896, an auction was held in Madrid, during which the family’s estates and art collection were sold. The paintings from the Witchcraft series were dispersed among various owners. Don Juan and the Commendatore was last seen during this auction and is now considered lost. Its existence is known through a photograph taken by Jean Laurent.

== Bibliography ==
- Hughes, Robert (2006). Goya: artysta i jego czas [Goya: The Artist and His Time] (in Polish). Warsaw: W.A.B. ISBN 978-83-7414-248-9. OCLC 569990350.
- Mena, Manuela; Wilson–Bareau, Juliet (1993). Goya: el capricho y la invención: cuadros de gabinete, bocetos y miniaturas [Goya: The Whim and Invention: Cabinet Paintings, Sketches, and Miniatures] (in Spanish). Madrid: Museo del Prado. ISBN 84-87317-24-3.
