= The Witches' Kitchen =

Painting by Francisco Goya

- La cocina de las brujas (Spanish)
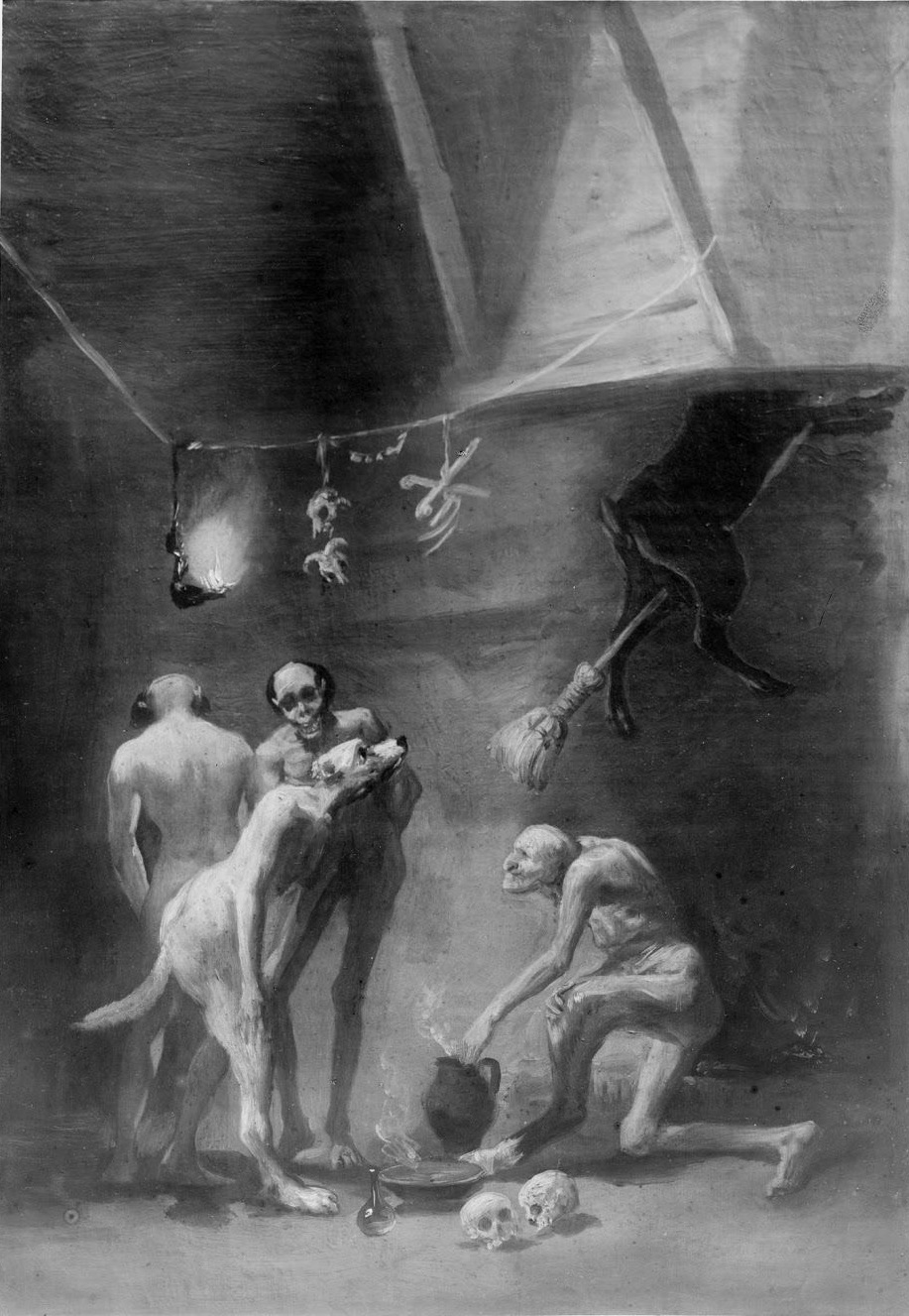
- Artist: Francisco Goya
- Year: 1797–1798
- Medium: oil on plain weave
- Dimensions: 45 × 32 cm
- Location: private collection, Mexico

The Witches' Kitchen (Spanish: La cocina de las brujas or Berganza y Cañizares) is a painting by the Spanish artist Francisco Goya, located in a private collection in Mexico. It is part of a series of six cabinet paintings, each measuring approximately 43 × 30 cm, with the theme of witchcraft. The paintings do not together form a single narrative and do not share a common meaning, so it is appropriate to interpret each one individually. The entire series was owned by the Dukes of Osuna and adorned their summer residence, Alameda de Osuna. In addition to The Witches' Kitchen, the series includes: Witches' Sabbath, Witches' Flight, The Incantation, The Bewitched Man, and Don Juan and the Commendatore. Four of the paintings are in various public collections, one in a private collection, and the last is considered lost.

== Circumstances of creation ==
=== Patronage of the Dukes of Osuna ===
In the early stages of his career in Madrid, Goya primarily worked for the Royal Tapestry Factory while simultaneously expanding his private clientele among the capital's aristocracy and bourgeoisie. Significant patrons of the painter became the Dukes of Osuna: Pedro Téllez-Girón and his wife María Josefa Pimentel. They were part of the intellectual elite and leading figures of the Spanish Enlightenment. Together, they organized discussion evenings that featured prominent "Enlightened". They actively supported culture, amassed an impressive library, and hosted theatrical performances in their residence. They extended their patronage to scientists and artists of the era, including Goya and Leandro Fernández de Moratín. Between 1785 and 1817, Goya painted around 30 works for them – portraits of the patrons and their children, religious scenes, and cabinet paintings. They also acquired the first editions of engravings from the Los caprichos series. After the duke's death in 1807, the painter continued to work for the duchess, including portraits of their adult daughters and sons.

=== Alameda de Osuna ===
In 1783, the Duke of Osuna acquired land and buildings in the northeastern Madrid locality of La Alameda, where wealthy families spent their summers, escaping the hustle of the city. Numerous development projects commissioned and implemented by the duke transformed the town, which soon changed its name to La Alameda de Osuna. By 1792, the duke's estate included a palace, and at the duchess' initiative, gardens known as El Capricho were also established. The Duke of Osuna purchased a cycle of six small-sized paintings from Goya to decorate the new palace. A bill sent to the duke dated 27 June 1798 for "six works on the theme of witches", totaling 6,000 reales, has been preserved.

It is often assumed that the paintings were created at the duchess' direct request; however, there is no evidence to support this. It is possible that Goya presented completed works to his patrons that suited their tastes. For this reason, it is difficult to determine whether the painter created them with a specific room in mind or if their placement was decided later. It is known that the paintings hung on the first floor in the hallway leading to the duchess' study, which was called the gabinete de países. Art historian Frank Irving Heckes believed that this room housed the duke's library, which is why Goya intentionally included literary motifs in his compositions. María Isabel Pérez Hernández, who analyzed the inventory of goods compiled in 1834 after the duchess' death, stated that Goya's paintings were then in the hallway of the gabinete de países, but the remaining furniture and items in that room did not indicate that it served as a library. Goya's works, along with engravings, were moved there only around 1845.

Witchcraft series

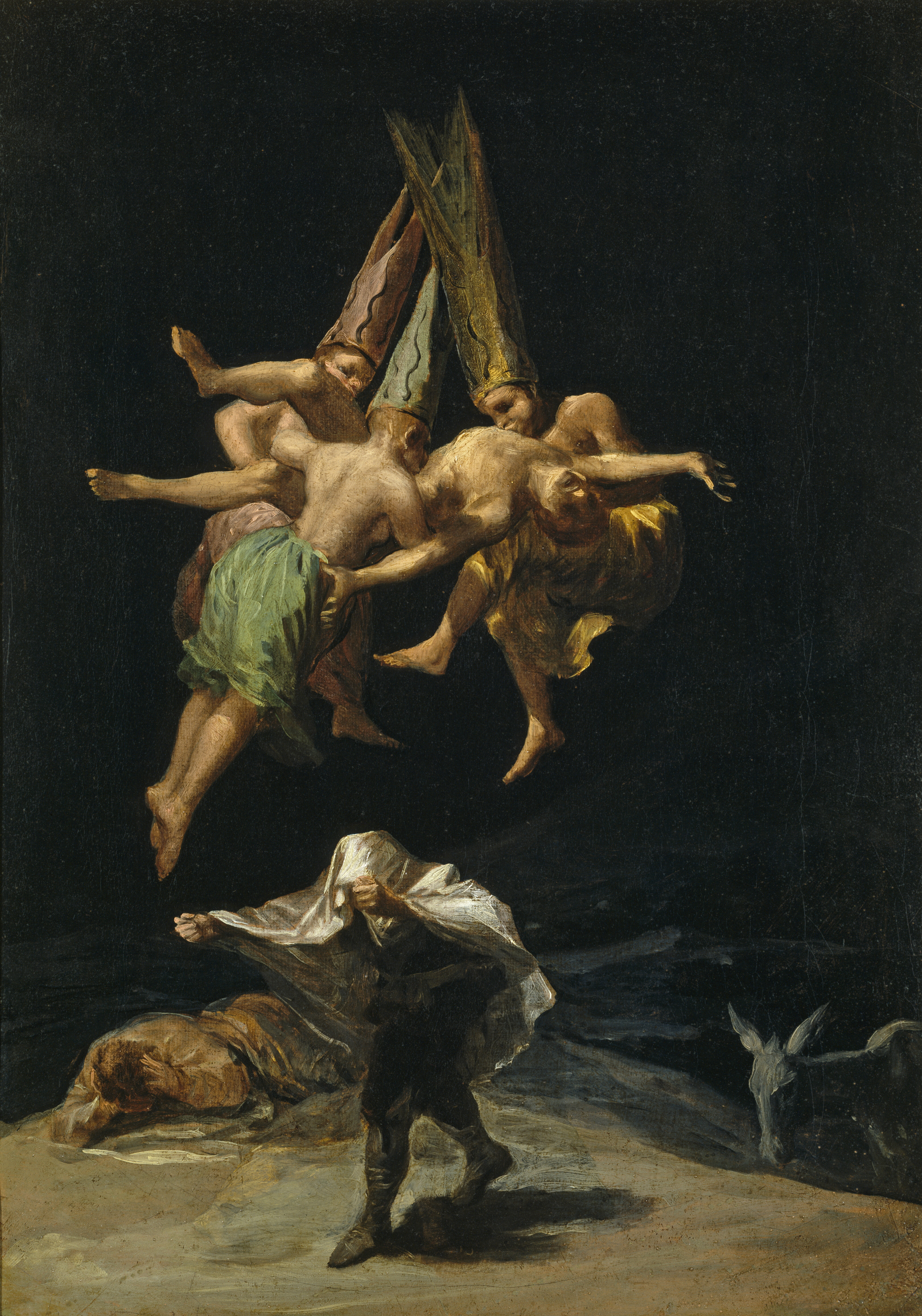
Witches' Flight

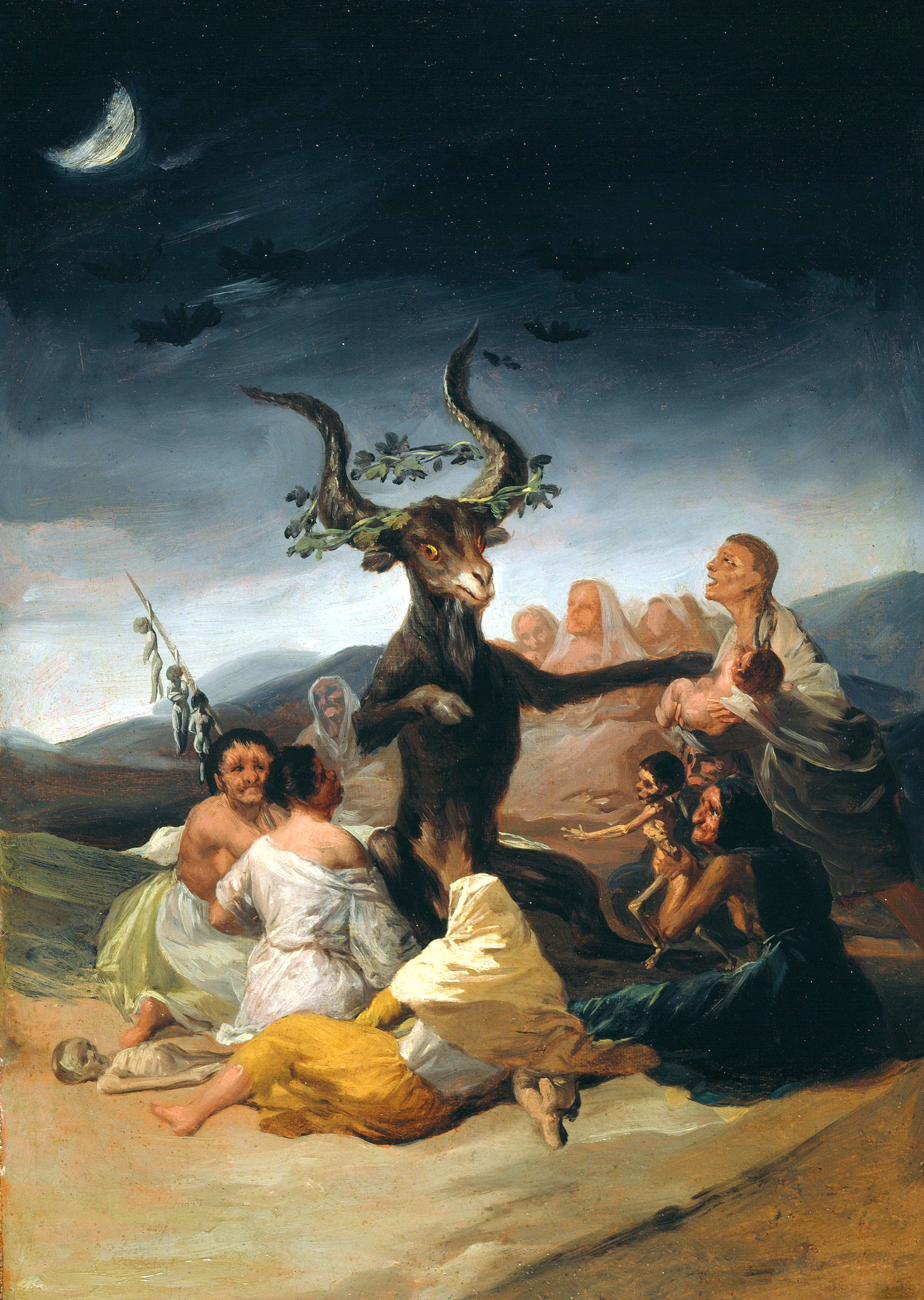
Witches' Sabbath

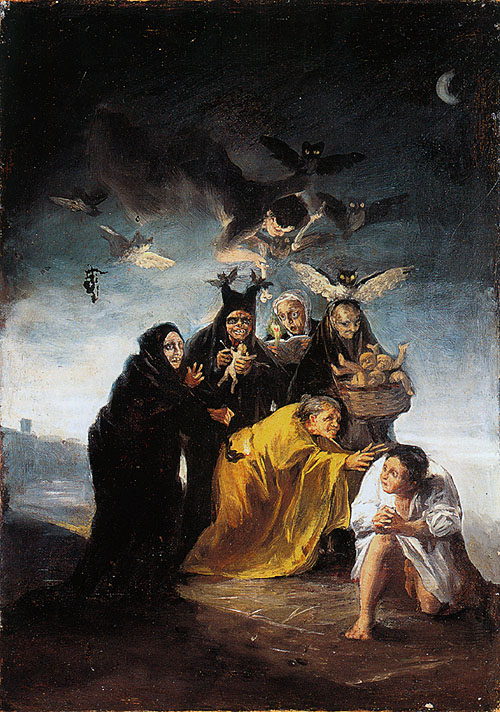
The Incantation

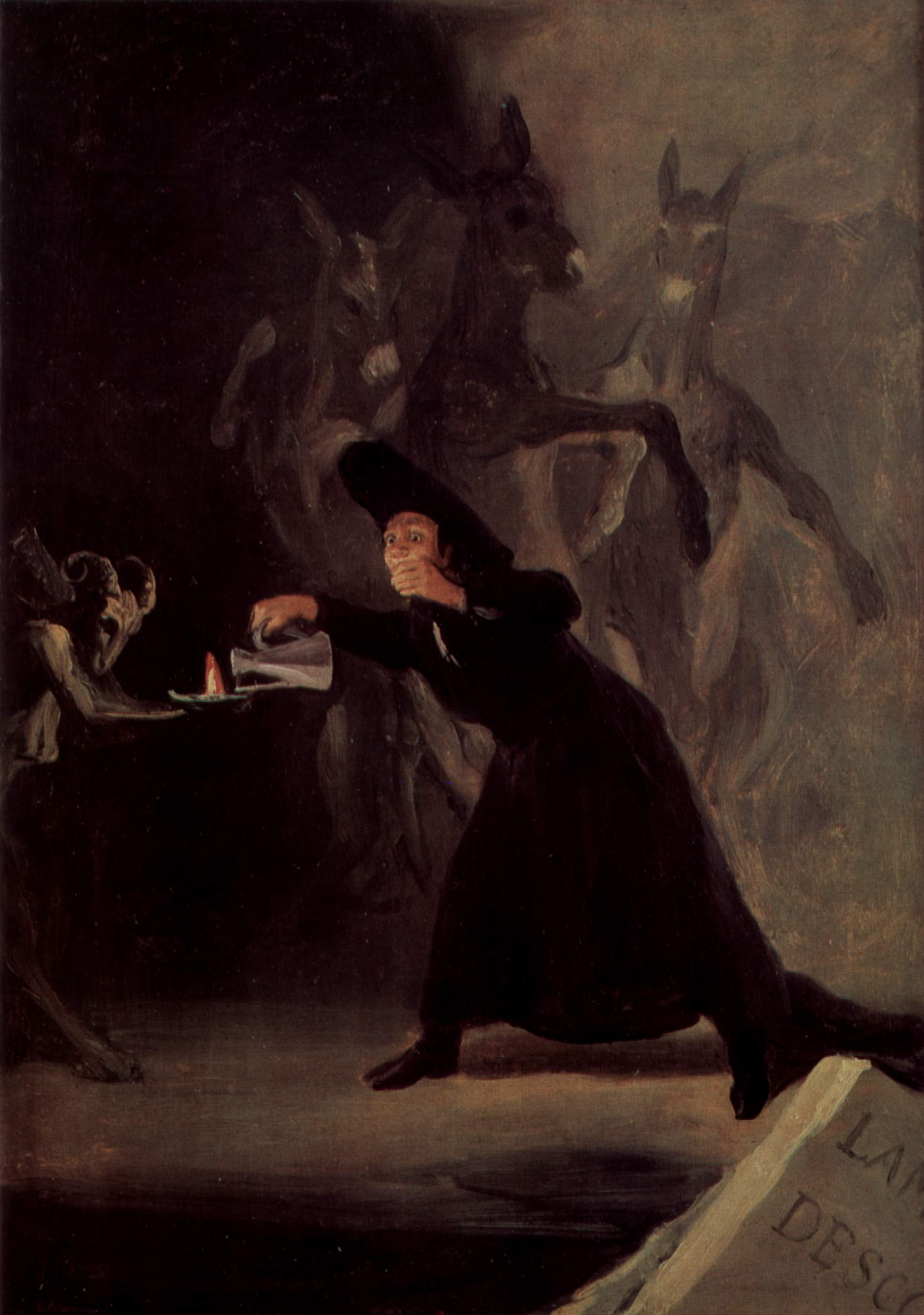
The Bewitched Man

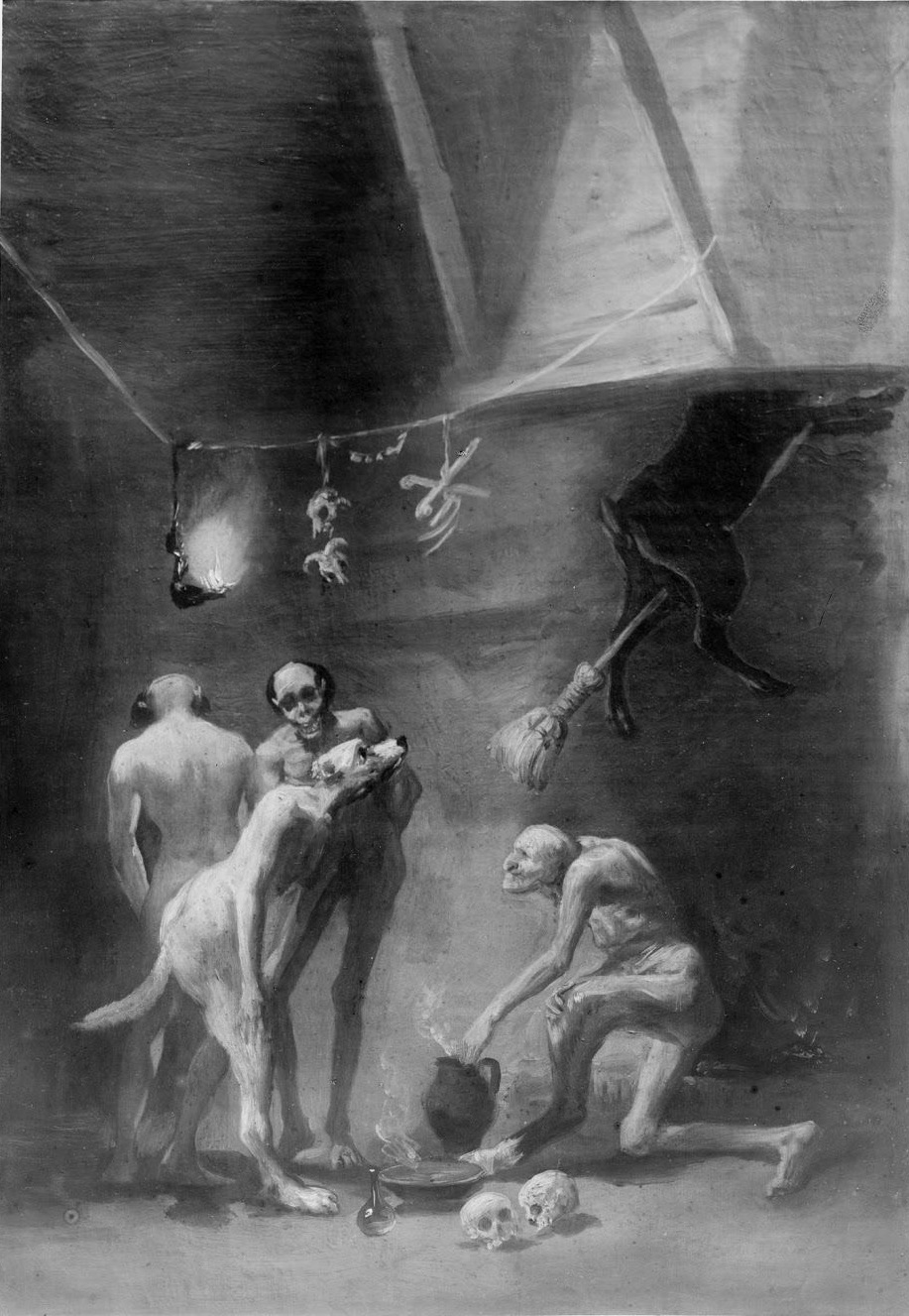
The Witches' Kitchen

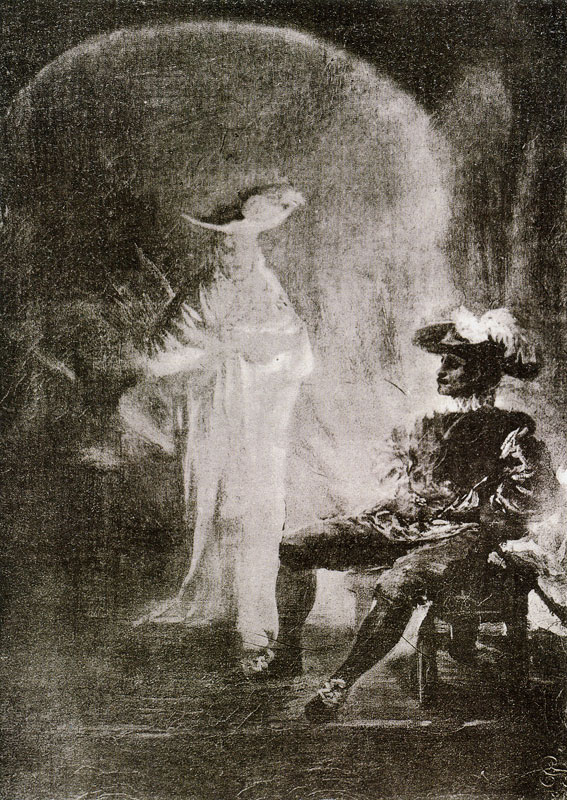
Don Juan and the Commendatore

=== Witches and sorcery ===
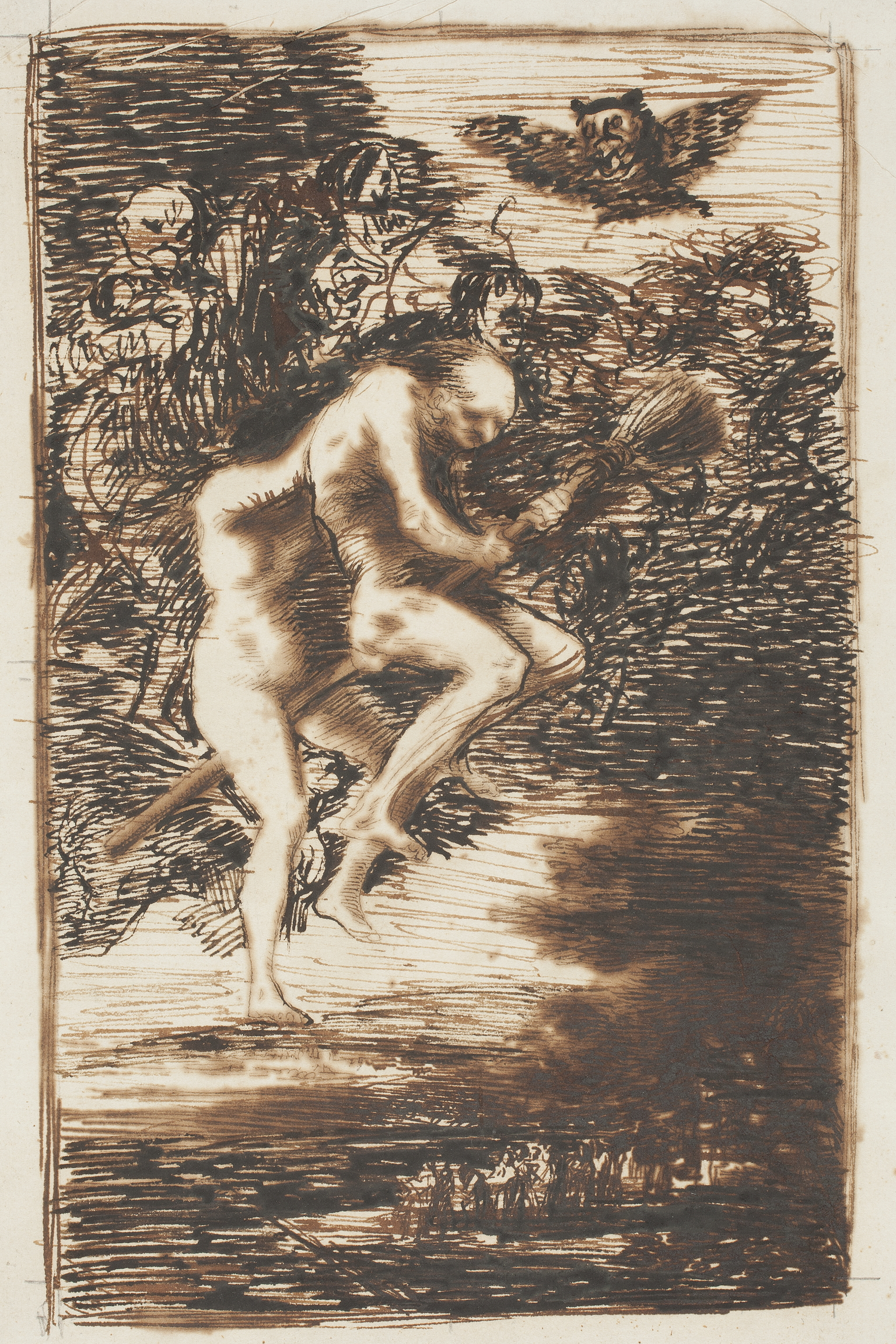
Drawing from the collection Dreams depicting witches, circa 1797

The subjects of the works were witches and sorcery, which were important elements of Spanish folklore. Popular belief in witchcraft and demons was widespread, and the inquiries and punishments of the Inquisition further invigorated and legitimized these superstitions. This popular motif appeared in art, literature, and theater, often in the form of satire. Goya was inspired by the theatrical works of Antonio de Zamora, which he could have seen in the private theater of the dukes. The enlightened nobility (the so-called ilustrados), to which the Dukes of Osuna belonged, did not believe in witchcraft; however, they were fascinated by the theme of sorcery, supernatural phenomena, and the associated plebeian culture. The dukes' library contained books on magic (including Malleus Maleficarum and Le Diable boiteux), for which they had special permission from the Holy Office. The duchess' mother was passionate about esotericism and novels such as William Beckford's Vathek. Many of Goya's enlightened friends were members of the Freemasonry.

The theme of witchcraft had a similar effect on Goya, who declared disbelief in witches and considered himself a skeptic, (Note: In a letter to his friend Martín Zapater, Goya writes: "I am not afraid of witches, devils, ghosts, boastful giants, rogues, scoundrels, and so on. None of these beings, in fact, are anything but human beings".) yet his works often featured demons and fantastic figures. It is unclear whether the Duchess of Osuna suggested the themes of the paintings to Goya or if they originated from his own invention. It is possible that when Goya was working on the portrait General Jose de Urrutia commissioned by the dukes, he had the opportunity to show the duchess drawings from the collection titled Dreams, where he addressed the theme of witchcraft to inspire her.

=== Dating ===
The paintings were most likely created between 1797 and 1798, but no later than the date on the invoice (27 June 1798). There are numerous thematic and compositional similarities to the series of engravings Los caprichos, which Goya was working on at the same time. Los caprichos served as a satire on Spanish society and a critique of religious fanaticism, the Inquisition, and superstitions. Josep Gudiol dated the Witches series to between 1794 and 1795, which coincided with the period of the painter's recovery after a severe illness that left him completely deaf between 1792 and 1793. Gradually returning to work, Goya focused on painting smaller works that required less physical effort. He also increasingly painted compositions dictated by his own imagination, avoiding existing patterns and free from generally accepted canons. According to art historian José Luis Morales y Marín, this series was exhibited by Goya at the Real Academia de Bellas Artes de San Fernando in 1799 as "six strange caprices". The dukes likely borrowed the paintings from Goya, possibly to help promote Los caprichos, which were published in the same year.

== Interpretation ==
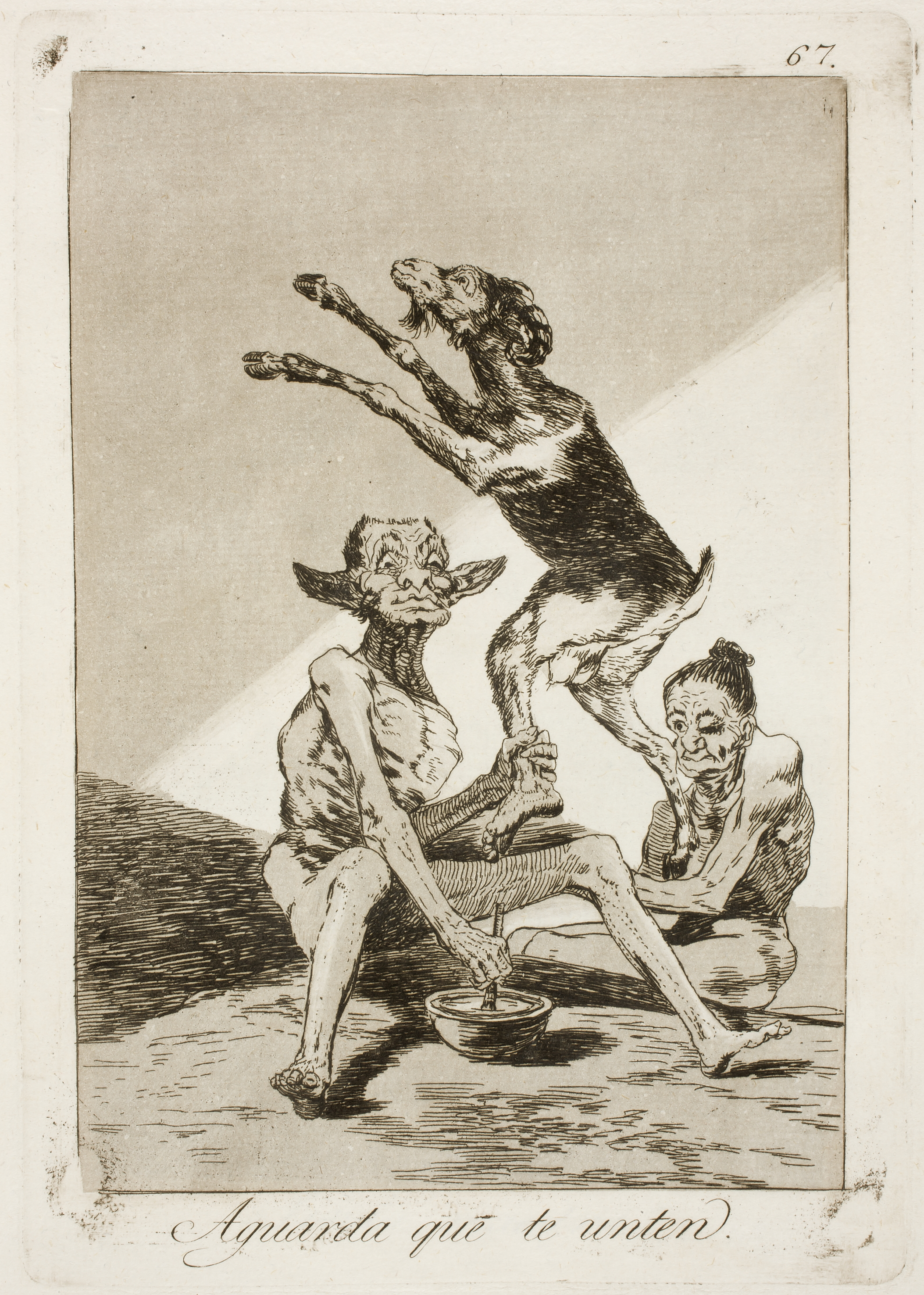
Engraving No. 67 titled Wait Till You've Been Anointed from the series Los caprichos

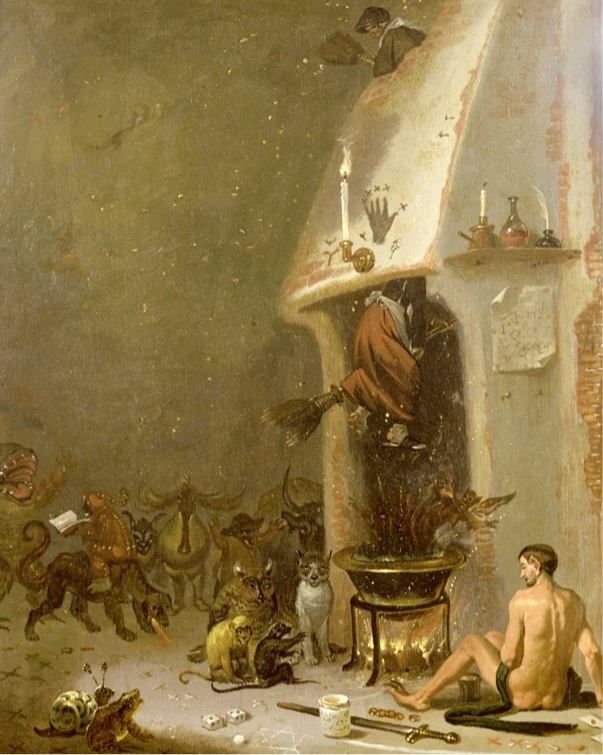
Painting with a similar composition from the workshop of David Teniers the Younger

This artwork has a different character than the other five paintings in the series, lacking the conflict between humans and the world of magic. Instead, Goya emphasizes a world that combines animalistic traits with those typically attributed to humans in a single being. In the kitchen, there are four figures of witches or wizards, whose gender is difficult to determine. On the ground lie a smoking bowl and jug, a bottle, and two human skulls. Above them hang bones, skulls, and an oil lamp that illuminates the scene. A black goat riding a broom flies out through a chimney over the hearth. One witch looking at it has the head, tail, and one leg of a dog. The one who is hunched down on the floor, reaching into the jug, has the face of an old witch and one animal leg. These witches are in the process of transforming into animals thanks to the magical ointments they are applying. The third figure has a skull-like head with dark, sunken eye sockets. The last figure, turned away from the viewer, is urinating. According to another interpretation, these two figures seen on the left side of the composition were conjured by the witch and transformed into demons.

Art historian Frank Irving Heckes believed the painting should be titled Berganza and Cañizares because it depicts characters from Miguel de Cervantes' Novelas ejemplares: The Deceptive Marriage and The Dialogue of Dogs. This is one of the most popular examples of the witch motif in Spanish literature. Goya's painting is said to portray a scene in which the witch Cañizares explains to the dog named Berganza how to summon demons and prepare magical ointments for flying. Both Goya's work and Cervantes' highlight how imagination can alter one's perception of reality.

This painting is also the most stylistically similar to the Los caprichos engravings. Goya uses the motif of transformation into animals as satire on human behavior, for instance, in engraving No. 67, Wait Till You've Been Anointed. Manuela Mena also points out the compositional similarity with a 17th-century painting on a similar theme from the workshop of David Teniers the Younger. Goya likely did not have the opportunity to see this specific work by the Flemish painter, but it is possible he encountered a similar composition and was inspired by it.

== Technique ==
According to Folke Nordström, the artist did not employ the typical triangular composition. The group of figures is not centered around a single figure or object but spreads out in several directions: one figure flies out through a chimney opening, while another turns its back to the others. The compositional lines are interrupted, and the arrangement is scattered, similar to the painting The Madhouse. A cord stretches diagonally, parallel to the broom flying up the chimney. Another source suggests that, similar to the painting The Incantation, the composition takes the shape of a hexagram resembling the Seal of Solomon, a magical symbol used in witchcraft, both to summon the devil and to cast a spell on an enemy.

== Provenance ==
The fortune of the Dukes of Osuna was largely squandered by their heirs, especially the twelfth Duke of Osuna, Mariano Téllez-Girón. In 1896, a public auction of the estate and art collection belonging to the family took place in Madrid. The paintings from the Witchcraft series were then sold to various owners.

In 1933, Mexican politician and collector Alberto J. Pani (1878–1955) purchased The Witches' Kitchen and the engraving Pretty Teacher (No. 68) from the Los caprichos series during a business trip to Europe. The Witches' Kitchen remained in his private collection in Mexico. In 1993, the painting appeared in the catalog of an exhibition at the Museo del Prado titled Goya: el capricho y la invención. Some sources state that the current location of the painting is unknown, or it may be in an unknown private collection.

== Bibliography ==
- Hughes, Robert (2006). Goya: artysta i jego czas [Goya: The Artist and His Time] (in Polish). Warsaw: W.A.B. ISBN 978-83-7414-248-9. OCLC 569990350.
- Mena, Manuela; Wilson–Bareau, Juliet (1993). Goya: el capricho y la invención: cuadros de gabinete, bocetos y miniaturas [Goya: The Whim and Invention: Cabinet Paintings, Sketches, and Miniatures] (in Spanish). Madrid: Museo del Prado. ISBN 84-87317-24-3.
