= Galdiano =

Galdiano is a surname. Notable people with the surname include:

- José Lázaro Galdiano (1862–1947), Spanish financier and art collector
- Mariel Galdiano (born 1998), American golfer
