= The Bewitched Man =

Painting by Francisco Goya

- La lámpara del Diablo (Spanish)
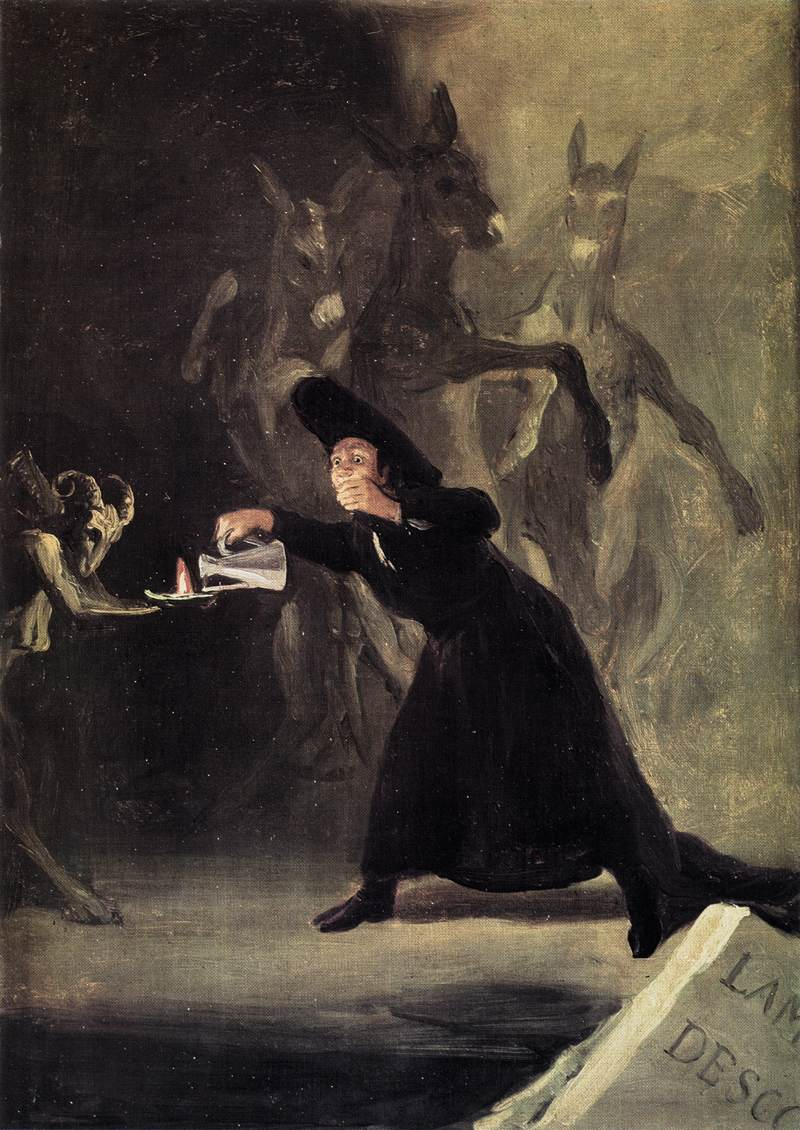
- Artist: Francisco Goya
- Year: c. 1798
- Medium: Oil on canvas
- Dimensions: 42.5 cm × 30.8 cm (16.7 in × 12.1 in)
- Location: National Gallery, London

The Bewitched Man (also known as The Devil's Lamp) is a painting completed c. 1798 by Francisco José de Goya y Lucientes. It is an oil painting on canvas and depicts a scene from a play by Antonio de Zamora called The man bewitched by force (Spanish: El hechizado por fuerza). The painting shows the protagonist, Don Claudio, who believes he is bewitched and that his life depends on keeping a lamp alight. It is held by the National Gallery, in London.

This is one of six paintings of witches and devils Goya painted for the Duke and Duchess of Osuna, who had an estate at Alameda de Osuna near Madrid.

== See also ==
- Witches' Flight
- Witches Sabbath (Goya, 1798)
- List of works by Francisco Goya
