= Witches' Flight =

Painting by Francisco Goya

- Vuelo de Brujas (Spanish)
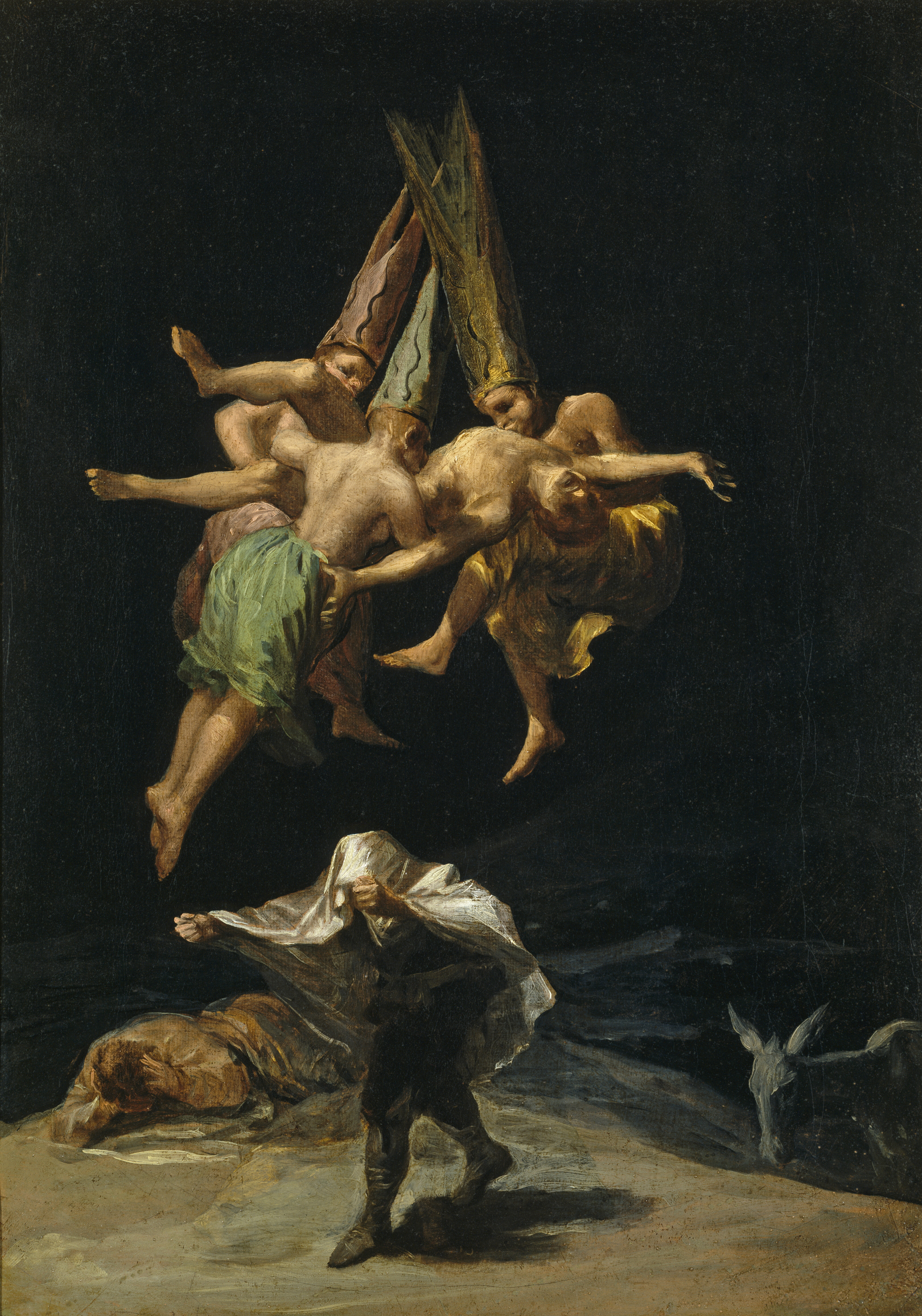
- Artist: Francisco Goya
- Year: 1797–98
- Medium: Oil on canvas
- Dimensions: 43.5 cm × 30.5 cm (17 1/8 in × 12 in)
- Location: Museo del Prado, Madrid

Witches' Flight (Spanish: Vuelo de Brujas, also known as Witches in Flight or Witches in the Air) is an oil-on-canvas painting completed in 1798 by the Spanish painter Francisco Goya.

The work was part of a series of six paintings related to witchcraft acquired by the Duke and Duchess of Osuna in 1798. (Note: The six paintings were Witches' Flight, The Spell, Witches' Sabbath, The Witches' Kitchen, The Devil's Lamp, and The Stone Guest.) It has been described as "the most beautiful and powerful of Goya's Osuna witch paintings."

== Description ==
At center point are three semi-nude witches wearing either penitential coroza or dunce caps.} bearing aloft a writhing nude figure, their mouths close to their victim, as if to devour him or suck his blood. (Note: The Spanish-language page for the painting alternatively suggests that they are blowing air on their victim, as indicated by their swollen cheeks.) Below, two figures in peasants' garb recoil from the spectacle: one has thrown himself to the ground covering his ears, the other attempts to escape by covering himself with a blanket, making the fig hand gesture to ward off the evil eye. Finally, a donkey emerges on the right, seemingly oblivious to the rest of the scene.

== Interpretation ==
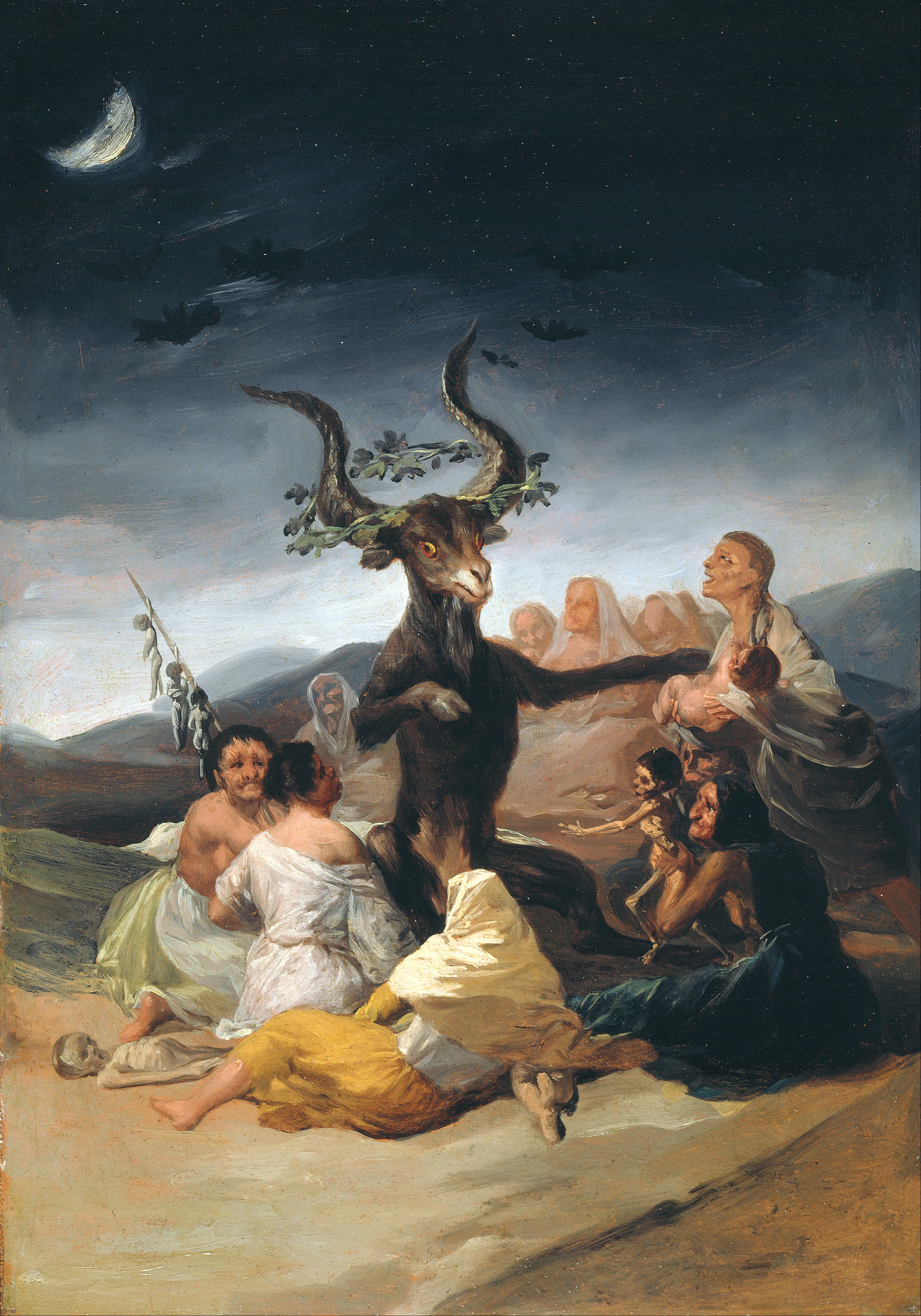
Goya, Witches' Sabbath, 1798. Museo Lázaro Galdiano, Madrid

The general scholarly consensus is that the painting represents a rationalist critique of superstition and ignorance, particularly in religious matters: the witches' corozas are not only emblematic of the violence of the Spanish Inquisition (the upward flames indicate that they have been condemned as unrepentant heretics and will be burned at the stake), (Note: The Spanish-language page for the painting instead identifies the markings as snakes.) but are also reminiscent of episcopal mitres, bearing the characteristic double points. The accusations of religious tribunals are thus reflected back on themselves, whose actions are implicitly equated with superstition and ritual sacrifice. The bystanders can then be understood either as appalled but unable to do anything or willfully ignorant and unwilling to intervene.

The donkey is a traditional symbol of ignorance.

== Provenance ==
The painting was sold to the Duke and Duchess of Osuna on 27 June 1798, to decorate their villa La Alameda, on the outskirts of Madrid. It was then sold in 1896 at the public auction of the Osuna estate to Ramón Ibarra, and again in 1985 to Jaime Ortiz Patiño. Finally, it was acquired by the Prado in 1999, where it remains to this day.

== See also ==
- List of works by Francisco Goya
- Witches' Sabbath (The Great He-Goat), Goya, c. 1820–1823
