= Manuela Mena =

Spanish art historian and curator

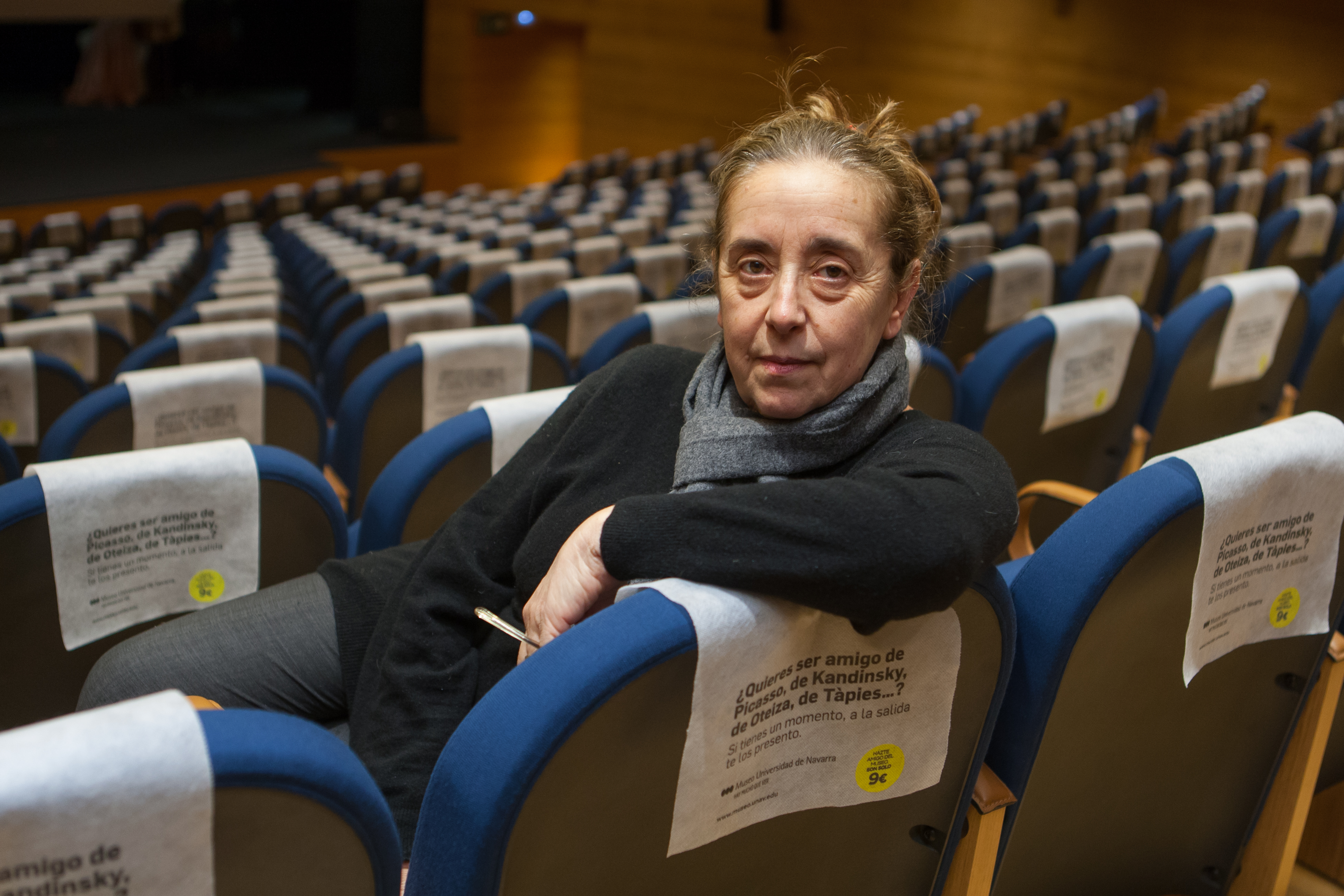

Manuela Beatriz Mena Marqués (born 30 January 1949 in Madrid) is a Spanish art historian and curator of 18th century art at the Museo del Prado. She is considered one of the leading experts on Francisco Goya.
