= José Lázaro Galdiano =

José Lázaro Galdiano photographed in the 1940s

José Lázaro Galdiano (1862–1947) was a Spanish financier, journalist, publisher and art collector, who, by the time of his death, owned one of the largest and most significant art collections in Spain. He was described in 1940 as "one of the greatest patrons of culture in nineteenth century Spain". At the time of his death, his collection numbered some 12,600 pieces, mostly from the Old Master and Romantic periods - he had little interest in the Modernists.

== Life ==
1912 portrait of Paula Florido by Pablo de Bejar. Museo Lázaro Galdiano

Lázaro was born in 1862 in Beire, Navarre. He studied Law and Philosophy in Seville and Madrid before taking office in 1883 at the Bank of Spain in Barcelona. However, his talent and ability in art appreciation and journalism soon took his career in another direction. He befriended Emilia Pardo Bazán who introduced him to the leading Spanish intellectuals of the time. In 1889, he co-founded the review España Moderna with Marcelino Menéndez y Pelayo and a number of leading Spanish critics. This was followed by the launch of the Revista Internacional; a review that featured Spanish, French, English and German writers.

In 1903, he married the glamorous Argentine Paula Florido (d. 1931) who shared his passion for art and advised him on many of his major acquisitions. She accompanied him on his frequent travels across Europe, Africa and North and South America seeking art objects. Lázaro was a member of the Athenæum of Madrid and served on the board of trustees at the Museo del Prado. In 1921, he was elected president of the International congress of History of Art. He spent the years of the Spanish Civil War in exile, first in Paris and later New York, where he continued to collect art works. He returned to Madrid following the end of the conflict.

== The Lázaro Galdiano Museum ==
Since Lázaro's death his home in Calle Serrano, a fashionable street in Madrid, has been adapted to serve as a museum to house his collections. The building was commissioned in 1903, the year of his marriage, and is in neo-Renaissance style. The museum is open to the public and includes works by Bosch, Velázquez, Goya, El Greco and Zurbarán.
