= Witches' Sabbath (Goya, 1798) =

Painting by Francisco de Goya

- El aquelarre (Spanish)
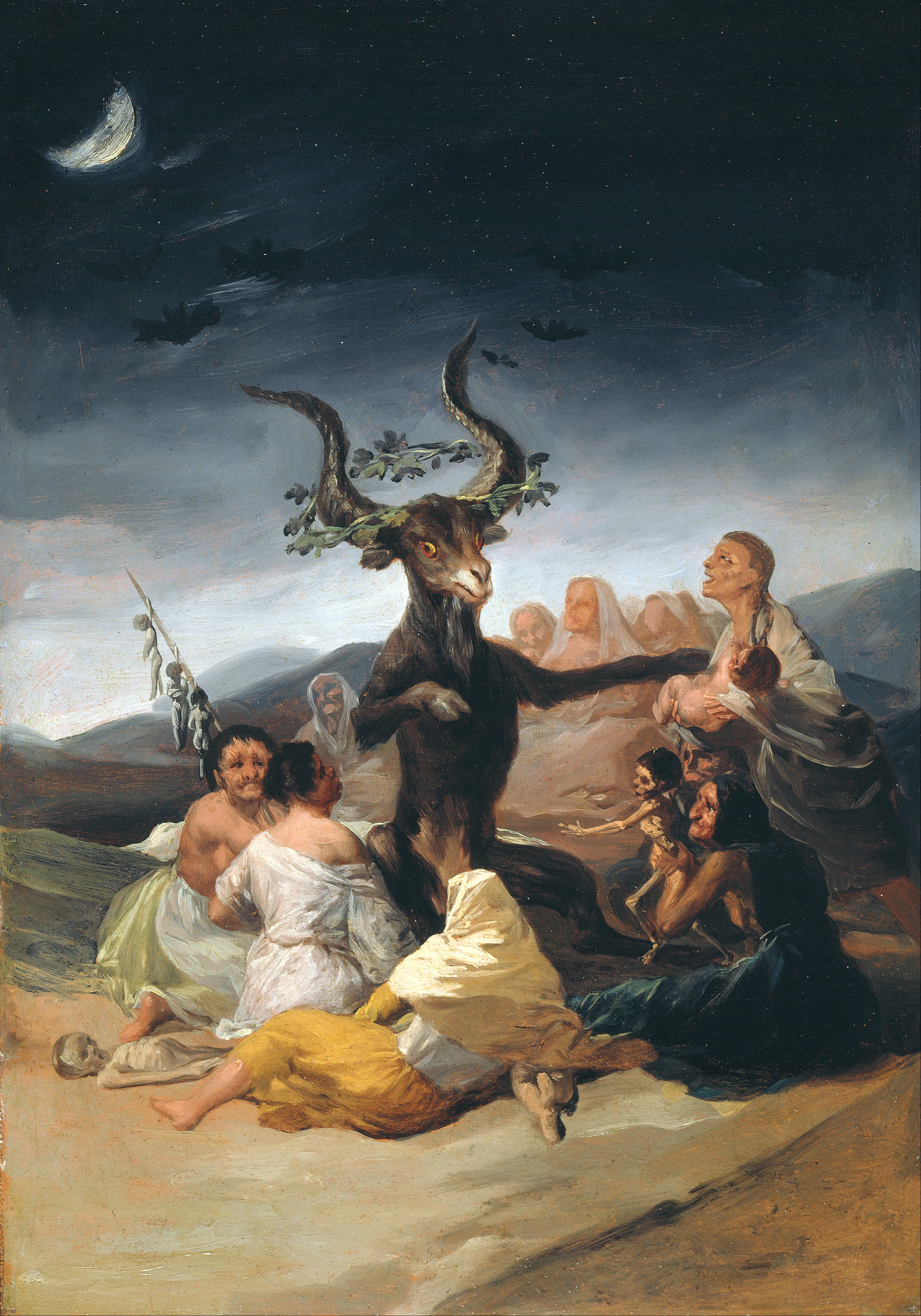
- Artist: Francisco Goya
- Year: 1797–1798
- Medium: Oil on canvas
- Dimensions: 43 cm × 30 cm (17 in × 12 in)
- Location: Museo Lázaro Galdiano, Madrid

Witches' Sabbath (Spanish: El Aquelarre) is a 1798 oil painting on canvas by the Spanish artist Francisco Goya. Today it is held in the Museo Lázaro Galdiano, Madrid. It depicts a Witches' Sabbath.

It was purchased in 1798 along with five other paintings related to witchcraft by the Duke and Duchess of Osuna. The acquisition of the witchcraft paintings is attributed to the duchess rather than her husband, but it is not known whether they were commissioned or bought after completion. In the twentieth century the painting was purchased by the financier José Lázaro Galdiano and donated to the Spanish state upon his death.

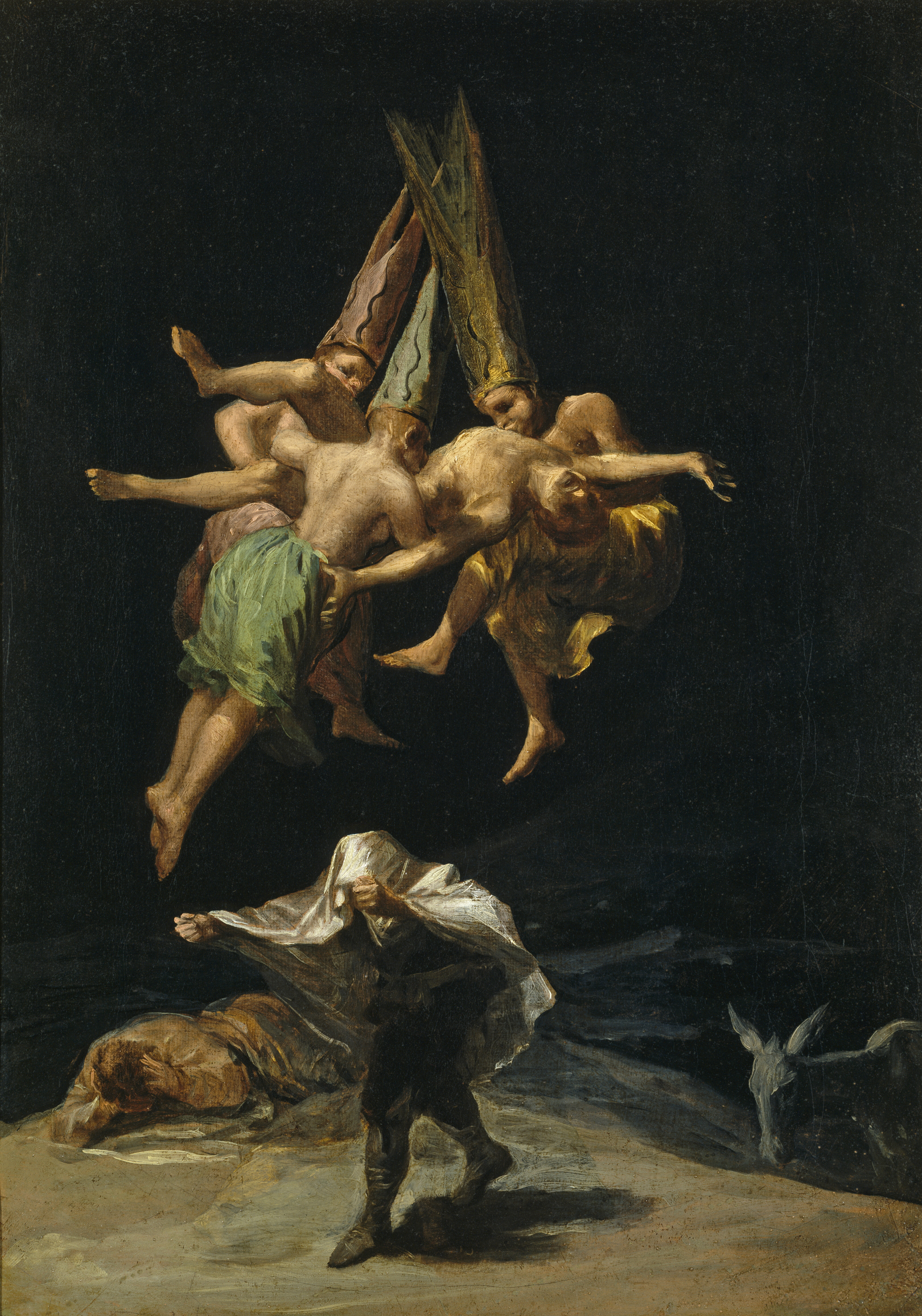
Witches' Flight, 1797–98. 43.5cm x 30.5cm, Museo del Prado, Madrid. This is another of the set of six owned by the Duchess of Osuna.

== Description ==
Witches' Sabbath shows Satan, surrounded by a coven of young and aged witches in a moonlit barren landscape. The goat possesses large horns and is crowned by a wreath of grape leaves. On the right, an old crone can be seen holding an extremely starved looking, but apparently still living, infant in her hands, while a younger witch to her right does the same with a healthier looking child, implying they will follow the same fate. The Devil seems to be acting as a sort of priest at an initiation ceremony for the children, although popular superstition at the time believed the Devil often fed on children and human fetuses. The dead body of an infant can be seen discarded to the left, whereas the legs of another can be seen held down with force to the ground by a presumably younger witch in the center foreground. More witches, young and old, can be seen in the background, as well as three dead infants hanging from the neck on a stake to the left.

Typical of the imagery of witchcraft, many of the symbols used are inverted. The goat extends his left rather than right hoof toward the child, while the quarter moon faces out of the canvas at the top left corner. In the middle high-ground, a number of bats can be seen flying overhead, their flocking motion echoing the curve of the crescent moon.

== Link with the Witch In The Air ==
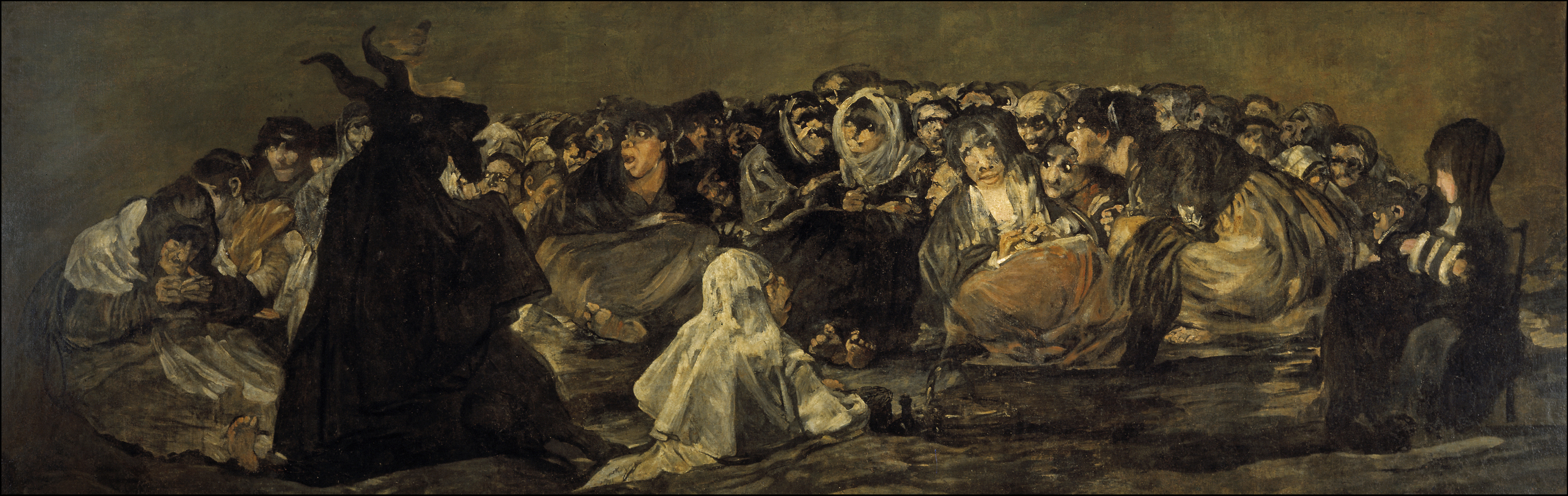
Witches' Sabbath 1821–1823, 140cm × 438cm, Museo del Prado

Goya used the imagery of covens of witches in a number of works, most notably in one of his Black Paintings, Witches' Sabbath or The Great He-Goat (1821–1823). His paintings have been seen as a protest against those who upheld and enforced the values of the Spanish Inquisition, which had been active in Witch hunting during the seventeenth-century Basque witch trials. Critics in the 20th century surmise that the Witches Sabbath was painted in 1798 as a bitter struggle raged between liberals and those in favour of a church and a royalist-led state, which culminated in the so-called Ominous Decade (1823–1833).

Both paintings can be seen as an attack on the superstitious beliefs rife in Spain during a period when tales of midnight gatherings of witches and the appearance of the devil were commonplace among the rural populace. They reflect Goya's disdain for the popular tendency towards superstition and the church-led return to medieval fears. Goya's depictions of such scenes in a painting commissioned by landed aristocrats somehow in one critic's words mocked what he saw as medieval fears exploited by the established order for political and capital gain.

== See also ==
- List of works by Francisco Goya

== Bibliography ==
- Boime, Albert. Art in an age of counterrevolution, 1815–1848. Chicago University Press, 2004. ISBN 0-226-06337-2
- Connell, Evan S. Francisco Goya: A Life. New York: Counterpoint, 2004. ISBN 1-58243-307-0
- Hagen, Rose-Marie & Hagen, Rainer. Francisco Goya, 1746–1828. Taschen, 2003. ISBN 3-8228-1823-2
- Hughes, Robert. Goya. New York: Alfred A. Knopf, 2004. ISBN 0-394-58028-1
- Francisco Goya. Kent: Grange Books, 2004. ISBN 1-84013-662-6
