= Juliet Wilson–Bareau =

British art historian (born 1935)

- Born: 1935 (age 90–91)
- Occupations: Art historian Curator; Scholar
- Writing career
- Language: English
- Subjects: Francisco Goya; Édouard Manet

Juliet Wilson–Bareau (born 1935) is a British art historian, curator, and independent scholar, specialising in Francisco Goya and Édouard Manet. From 1993 to 1994, she held the Slade Professorship of Fine Art at the University of Oxford. She curated a show on Goya at the Museo del Prado in Madrid in 1993 and at the Royal Academy of Arts in London in 1994.

== Selected works ==
- Cachin, Françoise; Moffett, Charles S.; Wilson-Bareau, Juliet (1983). Manet, 1832 - 1883: Galeries Nationales du Grand Palais, Paris April 22 - August 8, 1983; The Metropolitan Museum of Art, New York September 10 - November 27, 1983. New York: The Metropolitan Museum of Art. ISBN 978-0870993497.
- Wilson-Bareau, Juliet (1992). Manet and the Execution of Maximilian: Painting, Politics and Censorship. London: National Gallery. ISBN 978-1857090017.
- Wilson-Bareau, Juliet; Marqués, Manuela, eds. (1994). Goya: truth and fantasy: the small paintings. New Haven: Yale University Press. ISBN 978-0300058635.
- Wilson-Bareau, Juliet (1996). Goya's prints: the Tomás Harris collection in the British Museum (Rev ed.). London: British Museum Press. ISBN 978-0714107899.
- Wilson-Bareau, Juliet (1998). Manet, Monet and the Gare Saint-Lazare. Washington: National Gallery of Art. ISBN 978-0300075106.
- Wilson-Bareau, Juliet (2001). Goya: drawings from his private album. London: Hayward Gallery. ISBN 978-1853322167.
- Wilson-Bareau, Juliet, ed. (2000). Manet by himself: correspondence & conversation. London: Little, Brown & Co. ISBN 978-0316855051.
- Wilson-Bareau, Julia, and Degener, David C. (2003). Manet and the American Civil War: The Battle of the U.S.S. Kearsarge and the C.S.S. Alabama, Issued in connection with an exhibition held June 3 - August 17, 2003, Metropolitan Museum of Art, New York.
- Wilson-Bareau, Juliet; Lehmbeck, Leah (2014). Goya in the Norton Simon Museum. New Haven: Yale University Press. ISBN 978-0300196269.
