= Antonio de Zamora =

Spanish playwright

Antonio de Zamora (Madrid, November 1, 1660 - Ocaña, December 7, 1727) was a Spanish playwright.

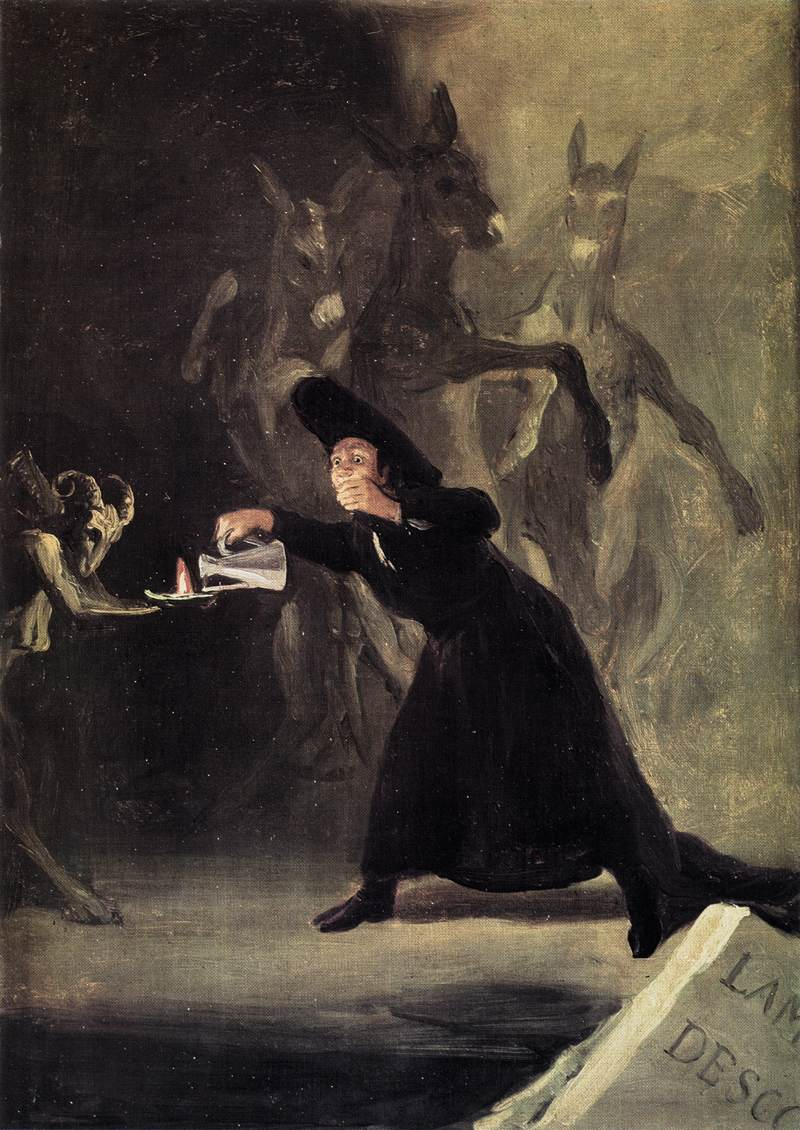
A painting by Goya inspired by one of Zamora's plays El Hechizado Por Fuerza

== Biography ==
In 1689, he already held a post within the Ministry for the Indies, New Spain department. He was a friend of the playwright Francisco Bances Candamo, whom he replaced as the government's official poet in 1694. In 1696 the city council of Madrid hired him as composer of the "Hieroglyphs for the tomb of the Queen Mother, Mariana", performed during the funeral rites on May 19 at the convent of Santo Domingo el Real; 1698 he became a chamberlain of King Charles II.

The city council also entrusted him with the inscriptions on the King's catafalque in the same church, and he composed his funeral rites in verse. Finally, in honour of Louis, Grand Dauphin, crown prince of France and father of Philip V of Spain, he was commissioned to write the "Hieroglyphics" in 1711.

A fervent supporter of the House of Bourbon during the War of the Spanish Succession, he was forced to hide from pro-Austrian supporters. He celebrated Philip V's entrance into Madrid with the sacramental ordinance The marriage suit of body and soul, which followed the precedent of Pedro Calderón de la Barca; he also celebrated this event with a heroic ballad entitled Epinicio métrico, Prosphonema numeroso. The zarzuela Love conquers all was composed in celebration of the birth of Louis I in 1707, and was performed in the Buen Retiro Colisseum with music by Antonio de Literes; his musical drama Angélica y Medoro was performed for Luis's wedding. In 1722 he published a collection of his works under the title of "New comedies", which shows him as a follower of Calderón's style, reworking many seventeenth century comedies and heralding the popularism of Ramón de la Cruz.

He cultivated the dramatic genres popular at the time: religious and saint-based comedies (Judas Iscariot, The morning star of Madrid and divine laborer San Isidro, David's sling), historical comedies (Each one is a lineage apar, The Maid of Orleans (about Joan of Arc), The defense of Tarifa, The destruction of Thebes) and figurehead comedies, of which are particularly notable Don Domingo de don Blas and Don Bruno de Calahorra, and especially The one bewitched by force, released in 1698 and one of his most famous comedies, satirizing the fool Don Claudio; in this, and in the style of Molière, he sketches a character who has more vices than virtues, common to a powerful social class in terms of economics, rank and alleged moral superiority; in the play, his refusal to marry in return prevents the marriage of his sister, and his arrogant, prejudiced and capricious attitude cause headaches for his servants, friends and doctor. The rest of the characters who surround him have no choice but to weave a web of deceit in which he is made to believe that he is cursed and will die if he does not marry. He uses all the means at his disposal to achieve this. This was the most famous work of his day and was performed over a century and a half. Another of his most successful works was There are no unmet deadlines and no unpaid debts, or the Stone Guest, which is based on the legend of Don Juan, a less subtle piece than that of Tirso de Molina and more realistic than that of José Zorrilla, as it does not have such an ambiguous ending. This play was performed every year at the festival of the dead until it was replaced by Zorrilla's work.

Zamora was also attracted by folkloric and fantastical themes, as shown for example by his popular comedy The magician of Salerno). He also developed the zarzuela, which he named "musical drama"; his libretto for The wind is the joy of love had music by José de Nebra; for this type of work he preferred mythological themes.

His dramatic works were published in four volumes in Madrid, 1722, under the title of New comedies (Comedias Nuevas con los mismos saynetes con que se executaron) and in Madrid, 1744 (Comedias de don Antonio de Zamora gentil-hombre que fue de la casa de su magestad, y su oficial de la Secretaría de Indias, parte de Nueva España). His entreméses represent a transition period towards the popularism of Ramón de la Cruz, including such works The slaps, The gurruminos and the gurruminas, The lawsuit of the landlady and the stake and the dances The peddler's love and The judgement of Paris, all of which were accomplished, amusing and satirical sketches; they can be found in Cotarelo's Collection of entremeses.

== Works ==
- Comedias Nuevas con los mismos saynetes con que se executaron, Madrid, 1722.
- Comedias de don Antonio de Zamora gentil-hombre que fue de la casa de su magestad, y su oficial de la Secretaría de Indias, parte de Nueva España, Madrid, 1744.

== Bibliography ==
- Germán Bleiberg and Julián Marías, Diccionario de Literatura Española. Madrid: Revista de Occidente, 1964.
