= The Family of the Infante Don Luis =

Painting by Francisco de Goya

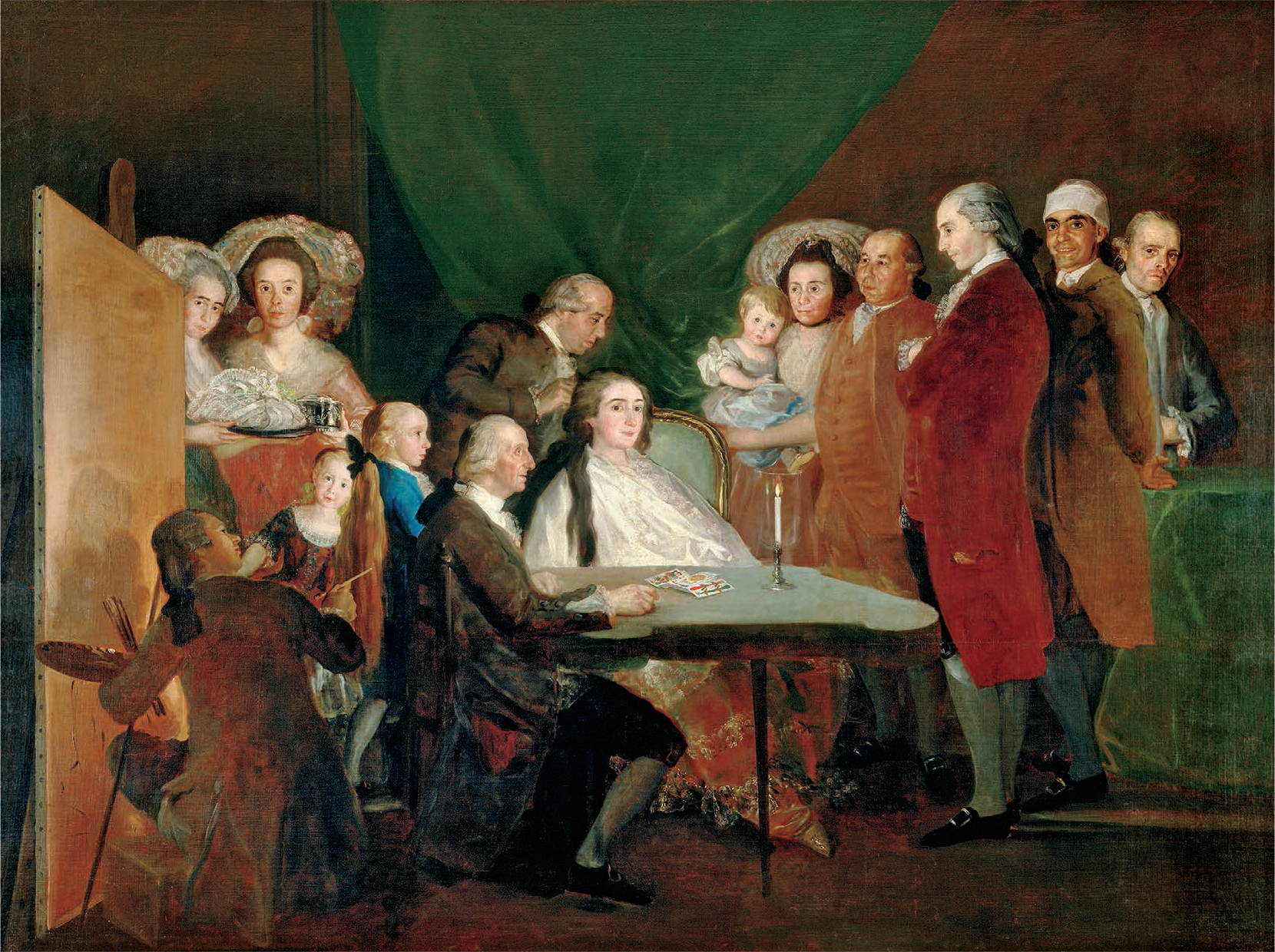
- Artist: Francisco de Goya
- Year: 1783–1784
- Medium: Oil on canvas
- Dimensions: 248 cm × 330 cm (98 in × 130 in)
- Location: Magnani-Rocca Foundation, Mamiano

The Family of the Infante Don Luis is a 1783–1784 painting by Francisco Goya, now in the Fondazione Magnani-Rocca in Traversetolo in the Province of Parma. Goya was invited to the Arenas de San Pedro estate near Ávila in mid August 1783 by Charles III's brother Luis of Spain, the portrait's subject along with his wife María Teresa de Vallebriga and their children.

== Historical context ==
Due to the prestige he had achieved as a portrait artist, in mid-August 1783, Goya was invited to the estate of Arenas de San Pedro, near Ávila, where Prince Luis of Bourbon (brother of King Charles III) was melancholically spending his final years with his wife, María Teresa de Vallebriga, whom he had married after renouncing the cardinalate. Goya spent a month in the company of Don Luis, a man of broad vision with whom he developed a fruitful relationship that also included personal and human understanding. The Aragonese painter was well-liked by everyone and enjoyed the intimate confidence of Don Luis's family, with whom he also went hunting.

The friendship between the two reached extraordinarily affectionate tones: a letter addressed to Martín Zapater on September 20, 1783, even reveals that Don Luis, after trying everything to convince Goya not to leave, made him promise to visit at least once a year. However, the painter did not keep this promise and never saw Don Luis again, who would die two years after their farewell.

The painting, inherited by Don Luis’s daughter, María Teresa de Borbón y Vallabriga, was moved around 1820 to the palace of Boadilla del Monte. It later became part of the collection of Carlota Luisa de Godoy y Borbón (María Teresa's daughter). The painting is explicitly mentioned in 1832 in the Inventario de todos los cuadros, pinturas, marcos sueltos y estampas que quedan colocados en el Palacio de Boadilla and again in the 1886 inventory, with an impressive valuation of 25,000 pesetas.

Inherited by the Ruspoli family in June 1904, the work eventually traveled to Florence, where it joined the Contini Bonacossi collection. In 1974, it became part of Luigi Magnani's collection.

== Description ==
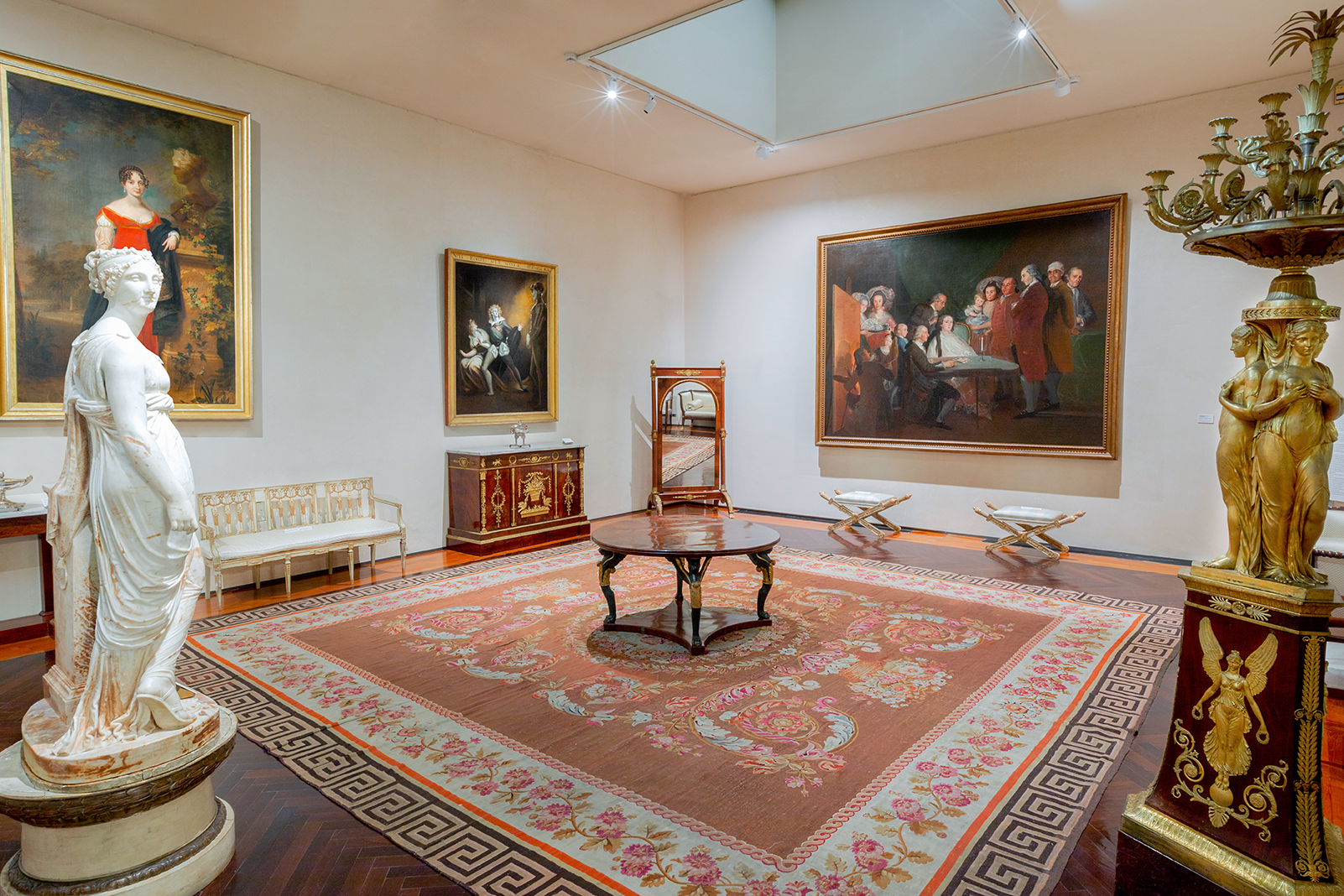
The Goya Room of the Magnani-Rocca Foundation (Italy)

The Family of the Infante Don Luis is an informal group portrait (far removed, therefore, from the outcomes of the later Charles IV of Spain and His Family), in which the fourteen members of Don Luis’s family appear “stiffened as if on the final cue, before the curtain falls,” as observed by Riccomini. It is, in fact, an informal and private scene of great intimacy, to the point that Goya chose to depict the small rural court from the left corner, in an understated position. He brought together—without distinctions of rank—maids, princes, courtiers, and bourgeois individuals.

The entire family is gathered around the table where Don Luis, depicted playing cards, is preparing to bid his evening farewell. On the far left of the scene, we recognize Goya himself, engaged in painting and observing the scene with tenderness and involvement. The self-portrait on the left edge of the canvas is an explicit reference to Las Meninas by Velázquez. However, here Goya abandons the intricate interplay of mirrors and perspectives and, most notably, chooses to depict himself in a position where, with his back to the patron, he theoretically would not be able to see the faces of the various characters.

Licht notes that “while insisting on reminding us of Velázquez’s masterpiece, Goya suppresses the pivotal element of Las Meninas—the mirror, through which Velázquez provides the key to interpreting his painting. The only explanation that clarifies both Goya’s position and the absence of the mirror is that the latter was not eliminated by Goya but merely shifted from the back wall to the wall in front of the royal family group [...] Goya does not paint his personal interpretation of the royal family but depicts only what they themselves saw. We are witnessing a decisive turning point in the history of portraiture.”

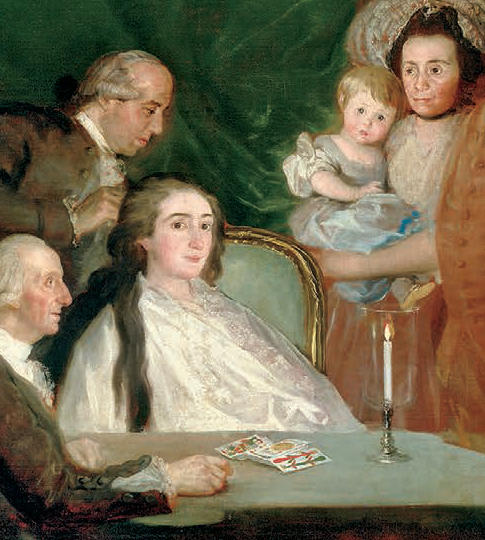
Detail of the painting

Also entering from the left are Doña Antonia de Vanderbrocht and Doña Petronila Valdearenas, the two maids in nightgowns, holding the queen’s jewelry box, the true focal point of the scene. María Teresa de Vallabriga, Don Luis’s wife, is seated at the center of the painting, patiently waiting as a servant finishes massaging her long hair, letting it down in preparation for the night’s rest. Despite her regal position, her gaze reveals great melancholy and unease.

The other figures in the scene include the young Don Luis María, the future Cardinal Archbishop of Toledo, dressed in an elegant blue outfit; María Teresa, who would later become the wife of Manuel Godoy; the nurse Doña Isidra Fuentes with the young María Josefa, the future Duchess of San Fernando; the imposing figure of Don Manuel Moreno, head of the Infante’s Secretariat; Don Gregorio Ruiz de Arce, Chamber Assistant; Don Alejandro de la Cruz, Court Painter to His Highness; and finally the forty-year-old Luigi Boccherini, composer and cellist, identified as the man in the long red coat.

Special mention is due to the man with his head bandaged: he is likely Francisco del Campo, the personal secretary of Doña María Teresa. Francisco is captured in the midst of a hearty, spontaneous laugh, conveying to the observer his view of the world—a simple, common, but very vibrant outlook. He represents the only festive presence in this family tableau of weary and disillusioned adults, pure and innocent children, and nobles burdened by the struggles of life.

The painting is steeped in a heavy, nocturnal atmosphere, typical of a fin-de-siècle mood, illuminated only by the flickering glow of a candle. Its burning in the still air adds a theatrical quality to the scene. Two main themes dominate the painting: first, the transience of life and the inevitability of death (memento mori), suggested by the potential extinguishing of the candle or the possible collapse of the table (structurally unfit to stand upright without falling). The highest expression of this theme is seen in the fatalistic gesture of Don Luis, shown in profile, as he places the cards on the green velvet surface.

The second theme is that of incomprehension or incommunicability. The depicted figures seem to be immersed in a deep and constant psychological isolation, their fixed gazes slightly unsettling, as if they are chasing the invisible thread of their thoughts. To quote Vittorio Sgarbi, “Each of those present, in those restless evening shadows, seems startled by some inner event, by omens.”

From a stylistic perspective, The Family of the Infante Don Luis adheres to the Neoclassical theories of the Bohemian Anton Raphael Mengs, exhibiting great pictorial sobriety. This is evident in the loosely defined brushwork (which nonetheless analytically reconstructs details), the simplified and stylized background, and, above all, the use of very austere colors.

Among the other artistic influences identified in the painting, critics have pointed to Corrado Giaquinto, from whom Goya borrowed the reddish palette, Joseph Wright of Derby, and finally Giandomenico Tiepolo.

== See also ==
- List of works by Francisco Goya
