= Portrait of Manuel Godoy =

1801 painting by Francisco de Goya

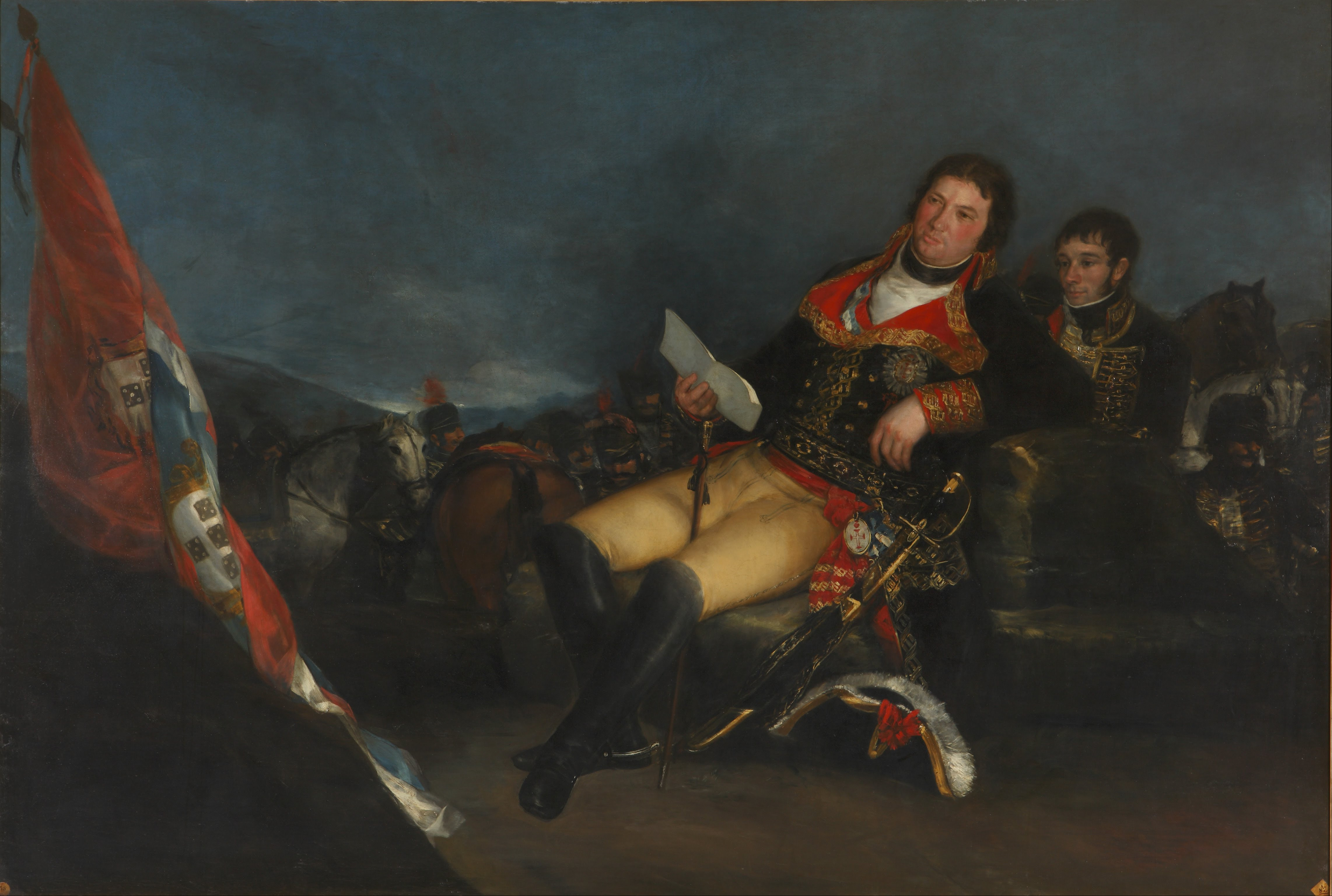
- Artist: Francisco Goya
- Year: 1801
- Medium: Oil on canvas
- Dimensions: 180 cm × 267 cm (71 in × 105 in)
- Location: Real Academia de Bellas Artes de San Fernando, Madrid

Portrait of Manuel Godoy is a large 1801 oil-on-canvas painting by the Spanish artist Francisco de Goya, now in the Real Academia de Bellas Artes de San Fernando. It was commissioned by the Spanish Prime Minister Manuel Godoy to commemorate his victory in the brief War of the Oranges against Portugal.

== History and description ==
In 1801 Godoy was at the height of his power, having won the War of the Oranges; he was now Generalissimo of "land and sea" and "Prince of Peace"; pompous titles he willingly accepted. He and Goya were friends; Godoy owned two of the artist's portraits of Majas, which he may have commissioned. He was close to and held influence over the Charles IV of Spain's wife, Maria Luisa of Parma, and married into the royal family via the Countess of Chinchon, a cousin of the king. Goya had earlier portrayed Godoy in 1794 when he was Duke of Alcudia, with a small equestrian portrait. His career ended in disgrace and after the Spanish War of Independence, after which he was banished to live in poverty. He died in exile in Paris in 1851. Despite his fall, he continued to speak favourably of the artist, and in his memoirs referred to Goya's Caprichos with extreme favour, as if he himself had seen them published.

The portrait is an incisive psychological characterisation. The subject's self-belief is depicted via his unusual reclining posture, the surrounding horses, and the phallic baton situated between his legs. The painting metaphorically places Godoy at the apex of the Spanish government. The artist captures Godoy's arrogance through his posture and the inclusion of Portuguese flags. The choice of lighting gives intensity to the piece.

== See also ==
- List of works by Francisco Goya

== Sources ==
- Bozal, Valeriano. Francisco Goya, vida y obra. Madrid, 2005. ISBN 84-96209-39-3.
- Braham, Allan. "Goya's Equestrian Portrait of the Duke of Wellington". Burlington Magazine, Vol. 108, No. 765, December 1966
- Glendinning, Nigel. "The Strange Translation of Goya's Black Paintings". The Burlington Magazine, Volume 117, No. 868, 1975
- Hagen, Rose-Marie & Hagen, Rainer. Francisco Goya, 1746–1828. London: Taschen, 1999. ISBN 978-3-8228-1823-7
- Hughes, Robert. Goya. New York: Alfred A. Knopf, 2004. ISBN 978-0-394-58028-9
