= Francisco Goya =

Spanish painter and printmaker (1746–1828)

Francisco de Goya
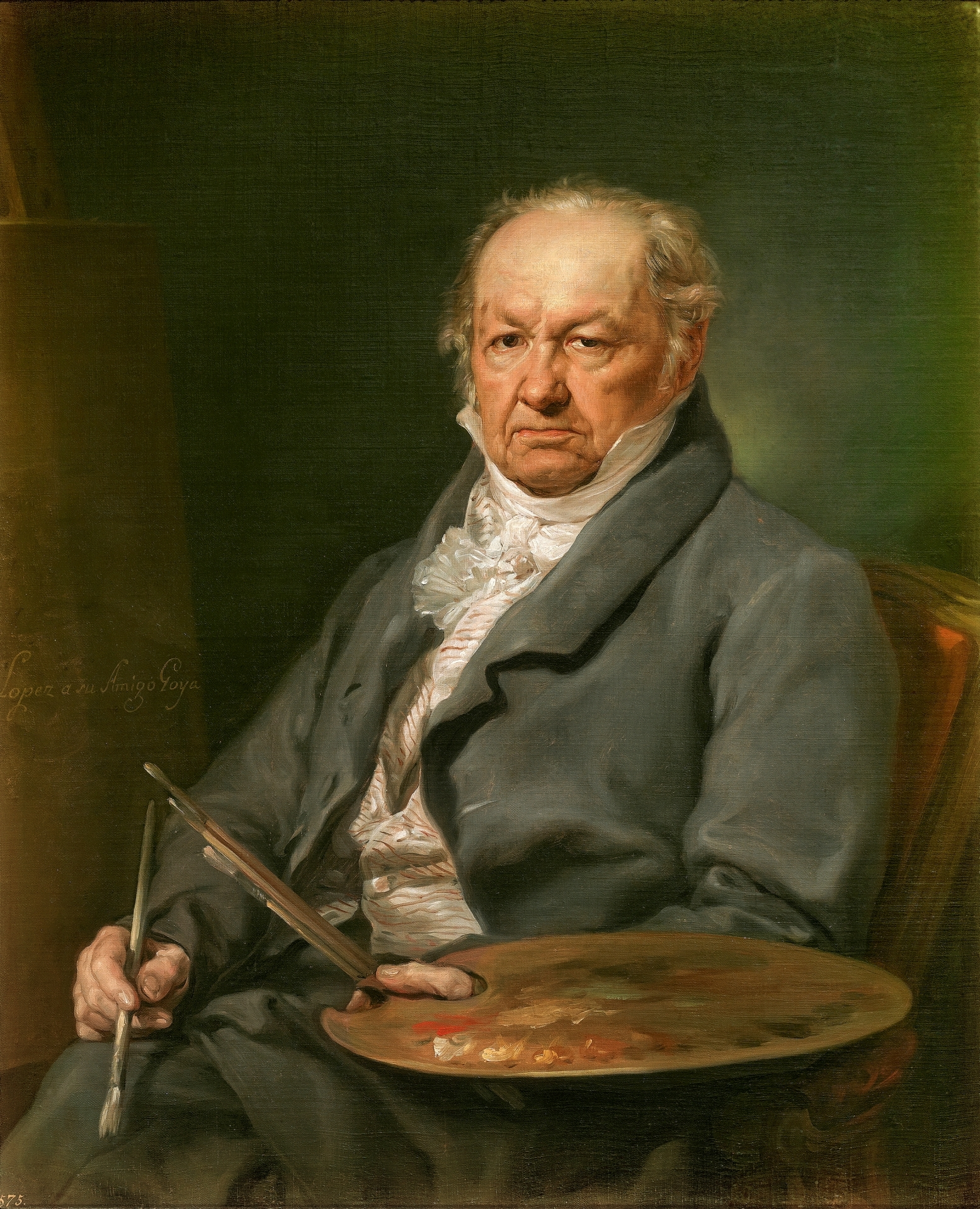
- Portrait by Vicente López Portaña, c. 1826
- Born: Francisco José de Goya y Lucientes; 30 March 1746; Fuendetodos, Aragon, Spain
- Died: 16 April 1828 (aged 82); Bordeaux, Gironde, France
- Known for: Painting, drawing, printmaking
- Notable work: La maja desnuda; The Third of May 1808; Black Paintings; Saturn Devouring His Son
- Movement: Romanticism
- Spouse: Josefa Bayeu (m. 1773; died 1812)
- Children: 8

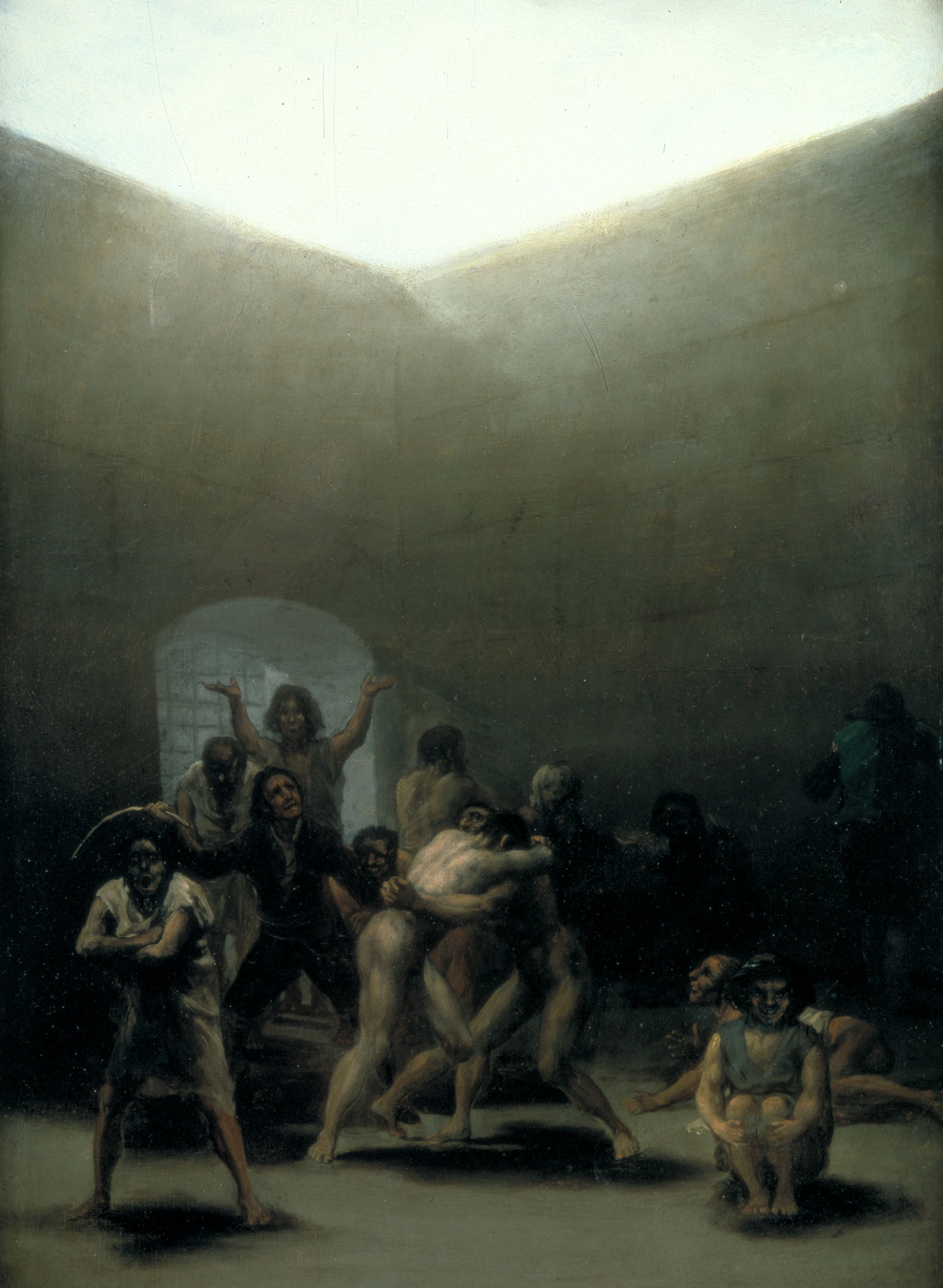
Yard with Lunatics, c. 1794

Francisco José de Goya y Lucientes (/ˈɡɔɪə/; Spanish: [fɾanˈθisko xoˈse ðe ˈɣoʝa i luˈθjentes]; 30 March 1746 – 16 April 1828) was a Spanish romantic painter and printmaker. He is considered the most important Spanish artist of the late 18th and early 19th centuries. His paintings, drawings, and engravings reflected contemporary historical upheavals and influenced important 19th- and 20th-century painters. Goya is often referred to as the last of the Old Masters and the first of the moderns. He is widely regarded as one of the most influential figures in the history of Western art.

Goya was born in Fuendetodos, Aragon, to a middle-class family in 1746. He studied painting from age 14 under José Luzán y Martínez and moved to Madrid to study with Anton Raphael Mengs. He married Josefa Bayeu in 1773. Goya became a court painter to the Spanish Crown in 1786 and this early portion of his career is marked by portraits of the Spanish aristocracy and royalty, and Rococo-style tapestry cartoons designed for the royal palace.

Although Goya's letters and writings survive, little is known about his thoughts. He had a severe and undiagnosed illness in 1793 that left him deaf, after which his work became progressively darker and more pessimistic. His later easel and mural paintings, prints, and drawings appear to reflect a bleak outlook on personal, social, and political levels and contrast with his social climbing. He was appointed Director of the Royal Academy in 1795, the year Manuel Godoy made an unfavorable treaty with France. In 1799, Goya became Primer Pintor de Cámara (Prime Court Painter), the highest rank for a Spanish court painter. In the late 1790s, commissioned by Godoy, he completed his La maja desnuda, a remarkably daring nude for the time and clearly indebted to Diego Velázquez. In 1800–01, he painted Charles IV of Spain and His Family, also influenced by Velázquez.

In 1807, Napoleon led the French army into the Peninsular War against Spain. Goya remained in Madrid during the war, which seems to have affected him deeply. Although he did not speak his thoughts in public, they can be inferred from his Disasters of War series of prints (although published 35 years after his death) and his 1814 paintings The Second of May 1808 and The Third of May 1808. Other works from his mid-period include the Caprichos and Los Disparates etching series, and a wide variety of paintings concerned with insanity, mental asylums, witches, fantastical creatures and religious and political corruption, all of which suggest that he feared for both his country's fate and his own mental and physical health.

His late period culminates with the Black Paintings of 1819–1823, applied on oil on the plaster walls of his house the Quinta del Sordo (House of the Deaf Man) where, disillusioned by political and social developments in Spain, he lived in near isolation. Goya eventually abandoned Spain in 1824 to retire to the French city of Bordeaux, accompanied by his much younger maid and companion, Leocadia Weiss, who may have been his lover. There he completed his La Tauromaquia series and a number of other works. Following a stroke that left him paralyzed on his right side, Goya died and was buried on 16 April 1828 aged 82.

== Early years (1746–1771) ==
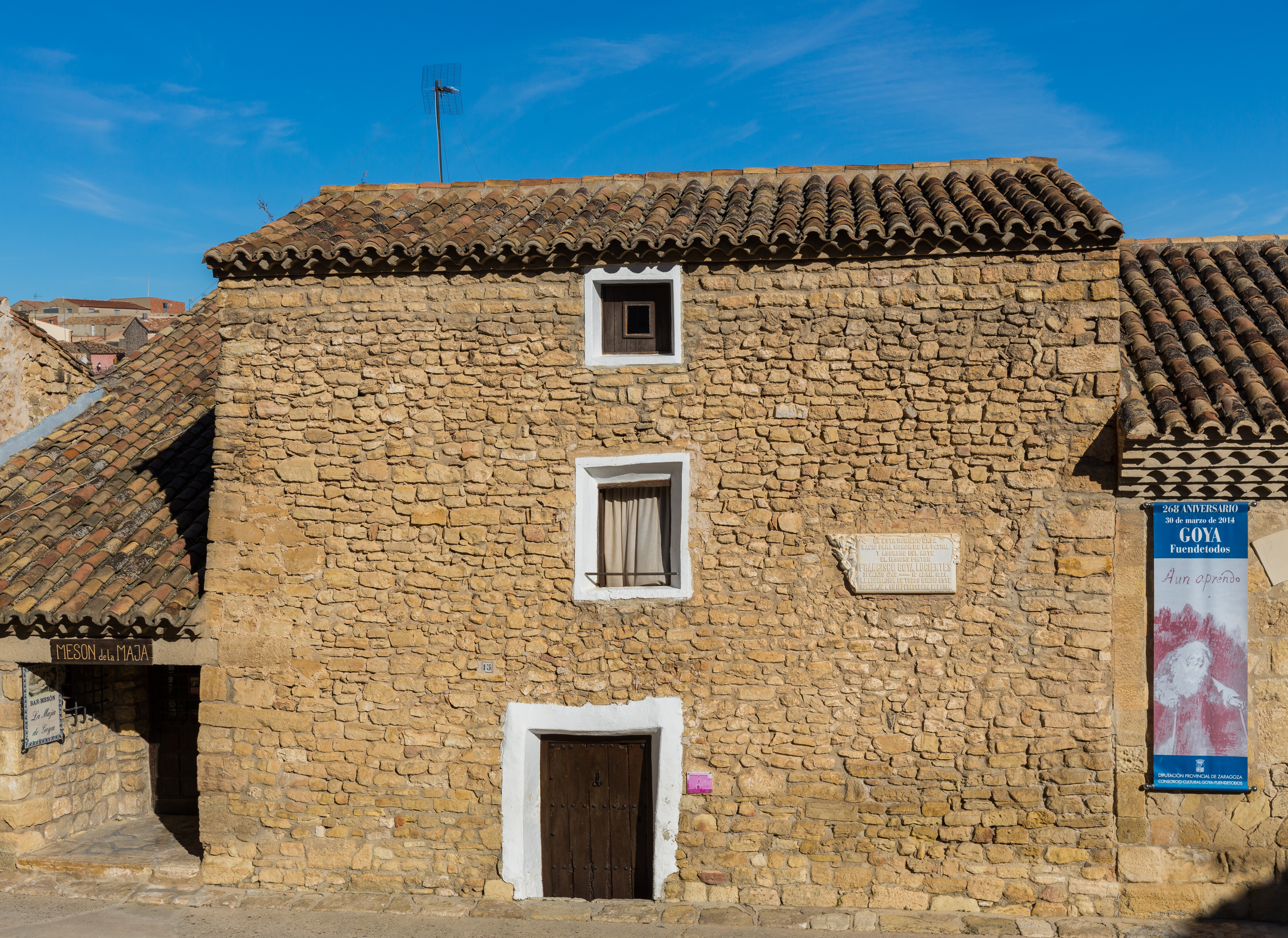
Birth house of Francisco Goya, Fuendetodos, Zaragoza

Francisco de Goya was born in Fuendetodos, Aragón, Spain, on 30 March 1746 to José Benito de Goya y Franque and Gracia de Lucientes y Salvador. The family had moved that year from the city of Zaragoza, but there is no record of why; likely, José was commissioned to work there. They were lower middle-class. José was the son of a notary and of Basque origin, his ancestors being from Zerain, earning his living as a gilder, specialising in religious and decorative craftwork. He oversaw the gilding and most of the ornamentation during the rebuilding of the Basilica of Our Lady of the Pillar (Santa Maria del Pilar), the principal cathedral of Zaragoza. Francisco was their fourth child, following his sister Rita (b. 1737), brother Tomás (b. 1739) (who was to follow in his father's trade) and second sister Jacinta (b. 1743). There were two younger sons, Mariano (b. 1750) and Camilo (b. 1753).

His mother's family had pretensions of nobility and the house, a modest brick cottage, was owned by her family and, perhaps fancifully, bore their crest. About 1749 José and Gracia bought a home in Zaragoza and were able to return to live in the city. Although there are no surviving records, it is thought that Goya may have attended the Escuelas Pías de San Antón, which offered free schooling. His education seems to have been adequate but not enlightening; he had reading, writing and numeracy, and some knowledge of the classics. According to Robert Hughes the artist "seems to have taken no more interest than a carpenter in philosophical or theological matters, and his views on painting ... were very down to earth: Goya was no theoretician." At school he formed a close and lifelong friendship with fellow pupil Martín Zapater; the 131 letters Goya wrote to him from 1775 until Zapater's death in 1803 give valuable insight into Goya's early years at the court in Madrid.

== Visit to Italy ==
At age 14 Goya studied under the painter José Luzán, where he copied prints for 4 years until he decided to work on his own, as he wrote later on "paint from my invention". He moved to Madrid to study with Anton Raphael Mengs, a popular painter with Spanish royalty. He clashed with his master, and his examinations were unsatisfactory. Goya submitted entries for the Real Academia de Bellas Artes de San Fernando in 1763 and 1766 but was denied entrance into the academia.

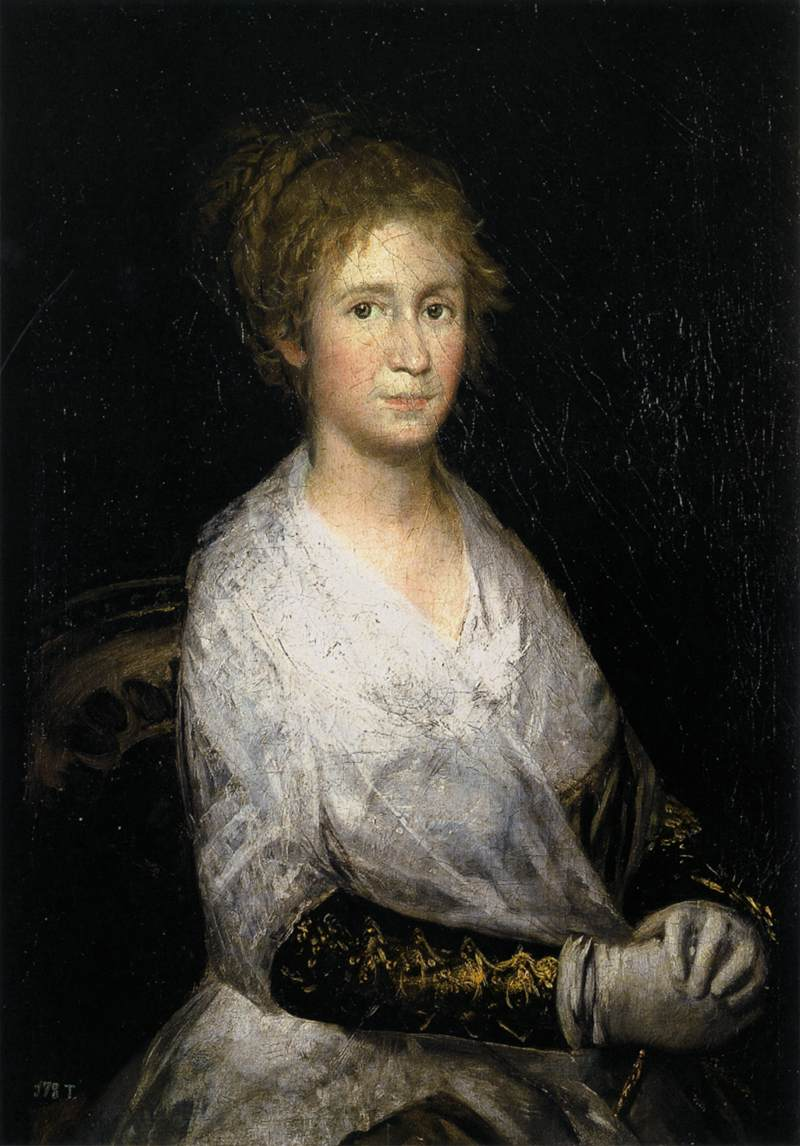
Portrait of Josefa Bayeu (1747–1812)

Rome was then the cultural capital of Europe and held all the prototypes of classical antiquity, while Spain lacked a coherent artistic direction, with all of its significant visual achievements in the past. Having failed to earn a scholarship, Goya relocated at his own expense to Rome in the old tradition of European artists stretching back at least to Albrecht Dürer. He was an unknown at the time and so the records are scant and uncertain. Early biographers have him travelling to Rome with a gang of bullfighters, where he worked as a street acrobat, or for a Russian diplomat, or fell in love with a beautiful young nun whom he plotted to abduct from her convent. It is possible that Goya completed two surviving mythological paintings during the visit, a Sacrifice to Vesta and a Sacrifice to Pan, both dated 1771.

In 1771 he won second prize in a painting competition organized by the City of Parma. That year he returned to Zaragoza and painted elements of the cupolas of the Basilica of the Pillar (including Adoration of the Name of God), a cycle of frescoes for the monastic church of the Charterhouse of Aula Dei, and the frescoes of the Sobradiel Palace. He studied with the Aragonese artist Francisco Bayeu y Subías and his painting began to show signs of the delicate tonalities for which he became famous. He befriended Francisco Bayeu and married his sister Josefa (he nicknamed her "Pepa") on 25 July 1773. Their first child, Antonio Juan Ramon Carlos, was born on 29 August 1774. Of their seven children only one, a son named Javier, survived into adulthood.

== Madrid (1775–1789) ==
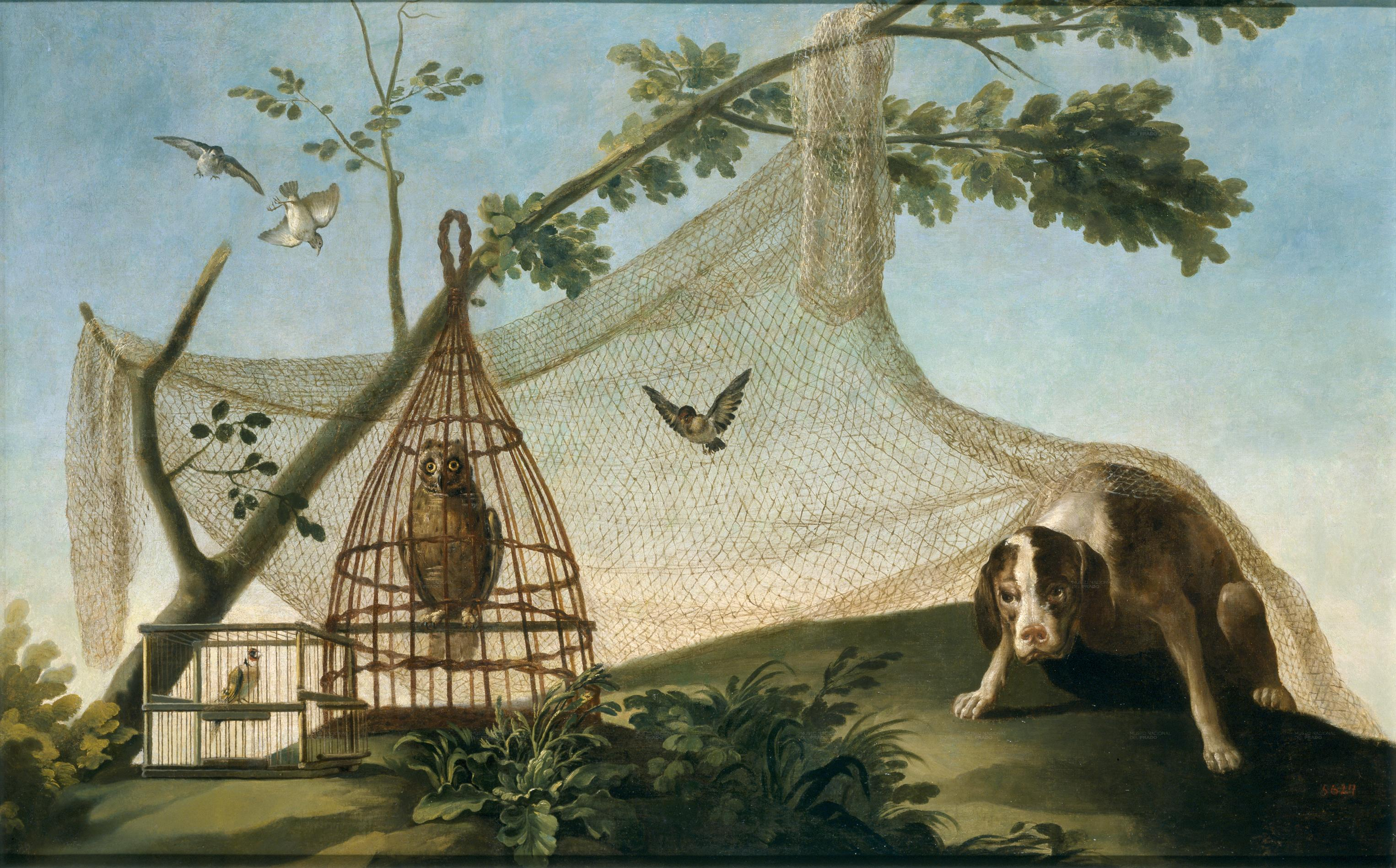
Caza con reclamo (1775)

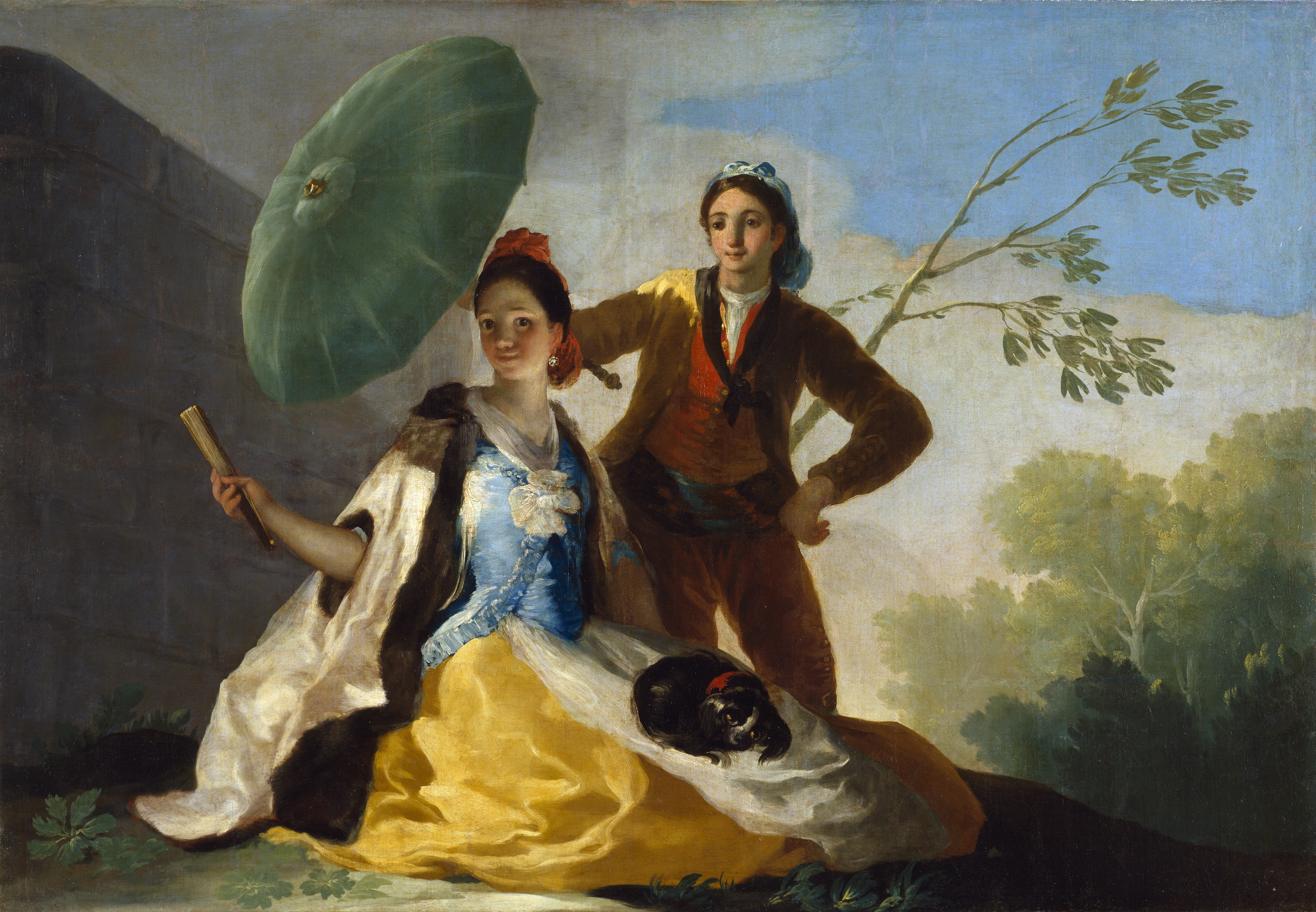
The Parasol, 1777

Francisco Bayeu (Josefa Bayeu's brother), 1765 membership of the Real Academia de Bellas Artes de San Fernando, and directorship of the tapestry works from 1777 helped Goya earn a commission for a series of tapestry cartoons for the Royal Tapestry Factory. Over five years he designed some 42 patterns, many of which were used to decorate and insulate the stone walls of El Escorial and the Palacio Real del Pardo, the residences of the Spanish monarchs. While designing tapestries was neither prestigious nor well paid, his cartoons are mostly popular in a rococo style, and Goya used them to bring himself to wider attention.

The cartoons were not his only royal commissions and were accompanied by a series of engravings, mostly copies after old masters such as Marcantonio Raimondi and Velázquez. Goya had a complicated relationship with the latter artist; while many of his contemporaries saw folly in Goya's attempts to copy and emulate him, he had access to a wide range of the long-dead painter's works that had been contained in the royal collection. Nonetheless, etching was a medium that the young artist was to master, a medium that was to reveal both the true depths of his imagination and his political beliefs. His c. 1779 etching of The Garrotted Man ("El agarrotado") was the largest etching he had produced to date and obviously foreshadows his later "Disasters of War" series.

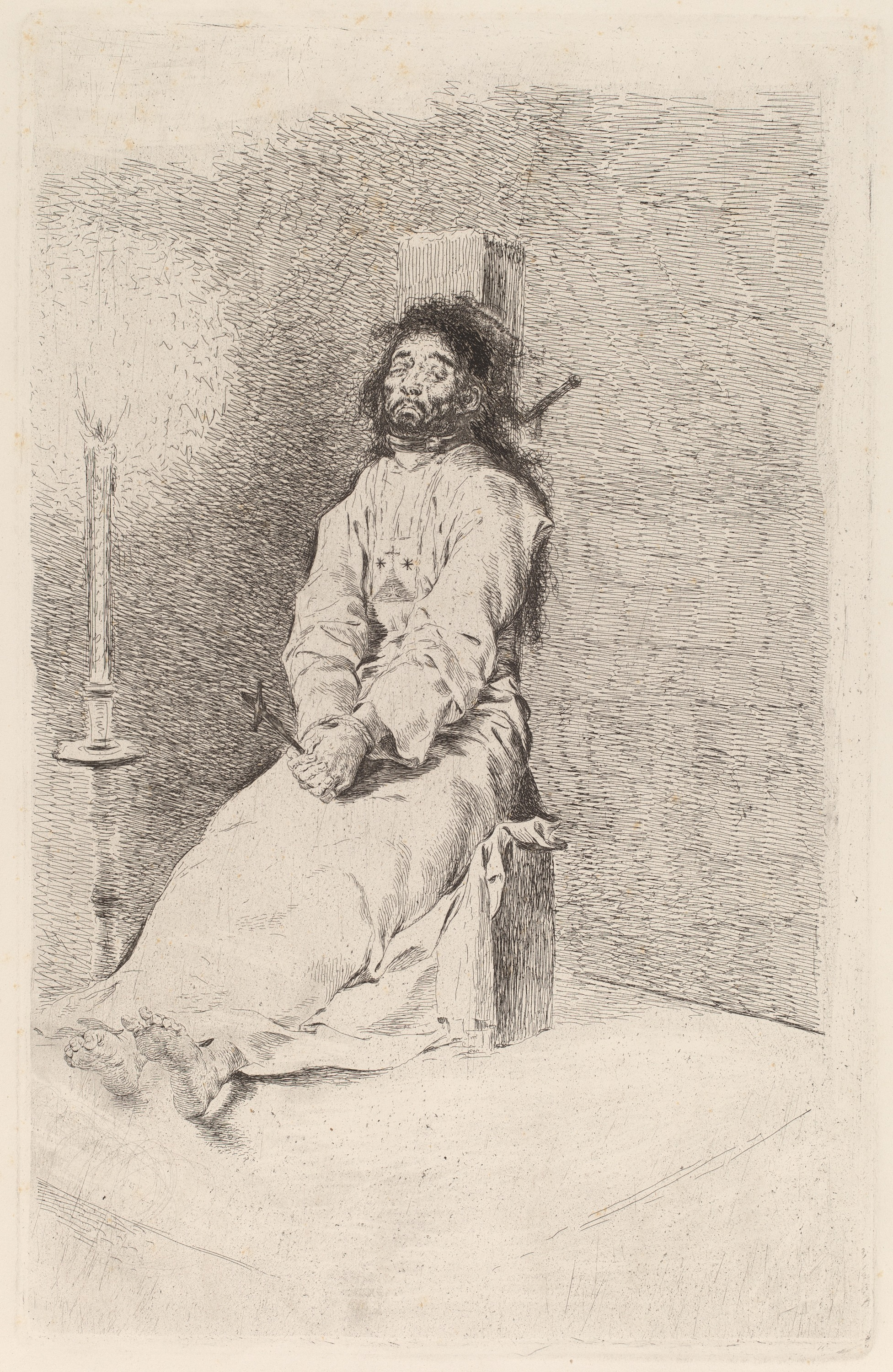
The Garrotted Man, before 1780. National Gallery of Art, Washington, D.C.

Goya was beset by illness, and his condition was used against him by his rivals, who looked jealously upon any artist seen to be rising in stature. Some of the larger cartoons, such as The Wedding, were more than 8 by 10 feet, and had proved a drain on his physical strength. Ever resourceful, Goya turned this misfortune around, claiming that his illness had allowed him the insight to produce works that were more personal and informal. However, he found the format limiting, as it did not allow him to capture complex color shifts or texture, and was unsuited to the impasto and glazing techniques he was by then applying to his painted works. The tapestries seem as comments on human types, fashion and fads.

Other works from the period include a canvas for the altar of the Church of San Francisco El Grande in Madrid, which led to his appointment as a member of the Royal Academy of Fine Art.

== Court painter ==
In 1783, the Count of Floridablanca, favorite of King Charles III, commissioned Goya to paint his portrait. He became friends with the King's half-brother Luis, and spent two summers working on portraits of both the Infante and his family. During the 1780s, his circle of patrons grew to include the Duke and Duchess of Osuna, the King and other notable people of the kingdom whom he painted. In 1786, Goya was given a salaried position as a painter to Charles III.

Goya was appointed court painter to Charles IV in 1789. The following year he became First Court Painter, with a salary of 50,000 reales and an allowance of 500 ducats for a coach. He painted portraits of the king and the queen, and the Spanish Prime Minister Manuel de Godoy and many other nobles. These portraits are notable for their disinclination to flatter; his Charles IV of Spain and His Family is an especially brutal assessment of a royal family. (Note: "Even if one takes into consideration the fact that Spanish portraiture is often realistic to the point of eccentricity, Goya's portrait still remains unique in its drastic description of human bankruptcy". Licht (1979), 68) Modern interpreters view the portrait as satirical; it is thought to reveal the corruption behind the rule of Charles IV. Under his reign his wife Louisa was thought to have had the real power, and thus Goya placed her at the center of the group portrait. From the back left of the painting one can see the artist himself looking out at the viewer, and the painting behind the family depicts Lot and his daughters, thus once again echoing the underlying message of corruption and decay.

Goya earned commissions from the highest ranks of the Spanish nobility, including Pedro Téllez-Girón, 9th Duke of Osuna and his wife María Josefa Pimentel, 12th Countess-Duchess of Benavente, José Álvarez de Toledo, Duke of Alba and his wife María del Pilar de Silva, and María Ana de Pontejos y Sandoval, Marchioness of Pontejos. In 1801 he painted Godoy in a commission to commemorate the victory in the brief War of the Oranges against Portugal. The two were friends, even if Goya's 1801 portrait is usually seen as satire. Yet even after Godoy's fall from grace the politician referred to the artist in warm terms. Godoy saw himself as instrumental in the publication of the Caprichos and is widely believed to have commissioned La maja desnuda.

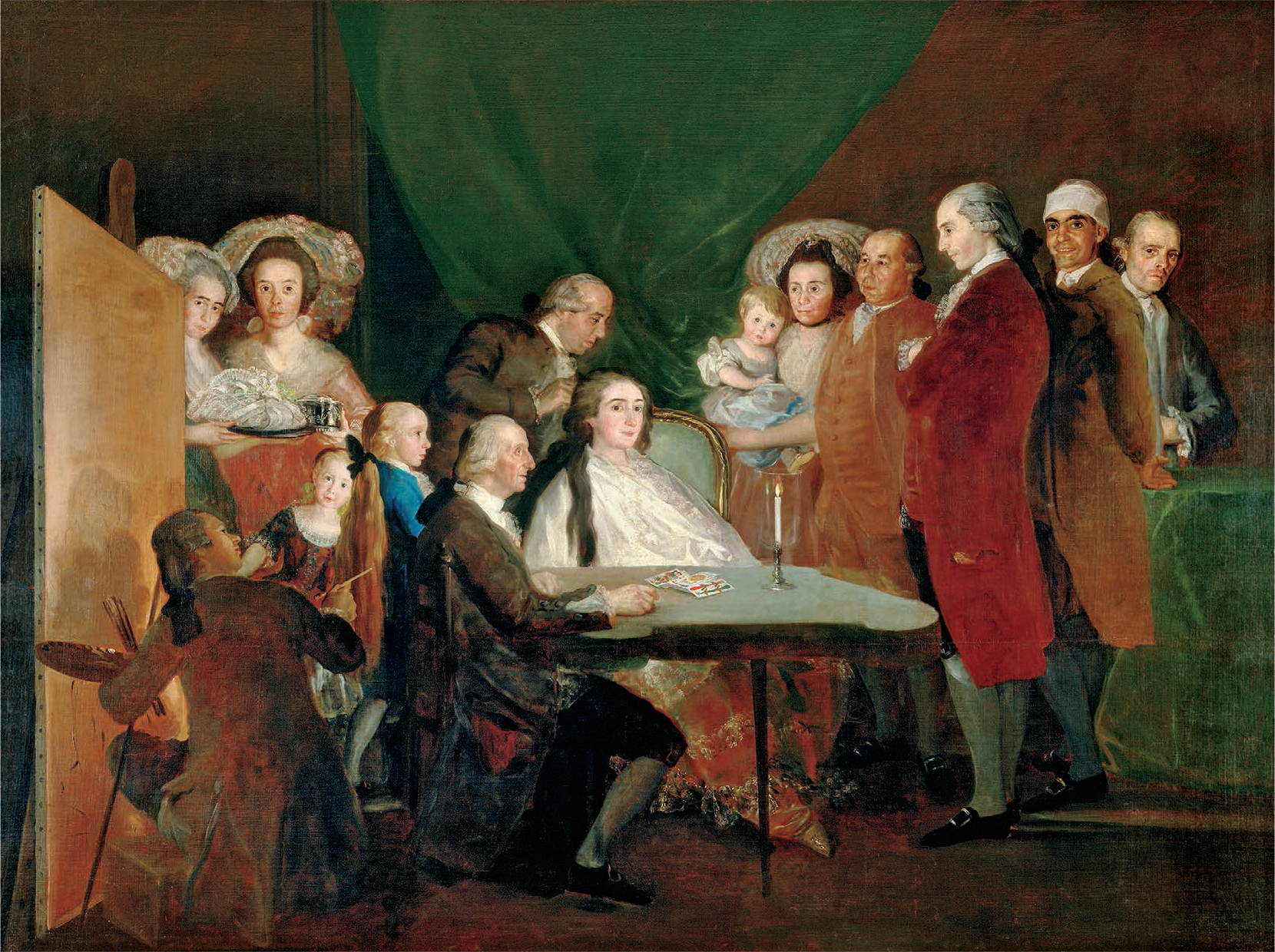
The Family of the Infante Don Luis, 1784. Magnani-Rocca, Parma

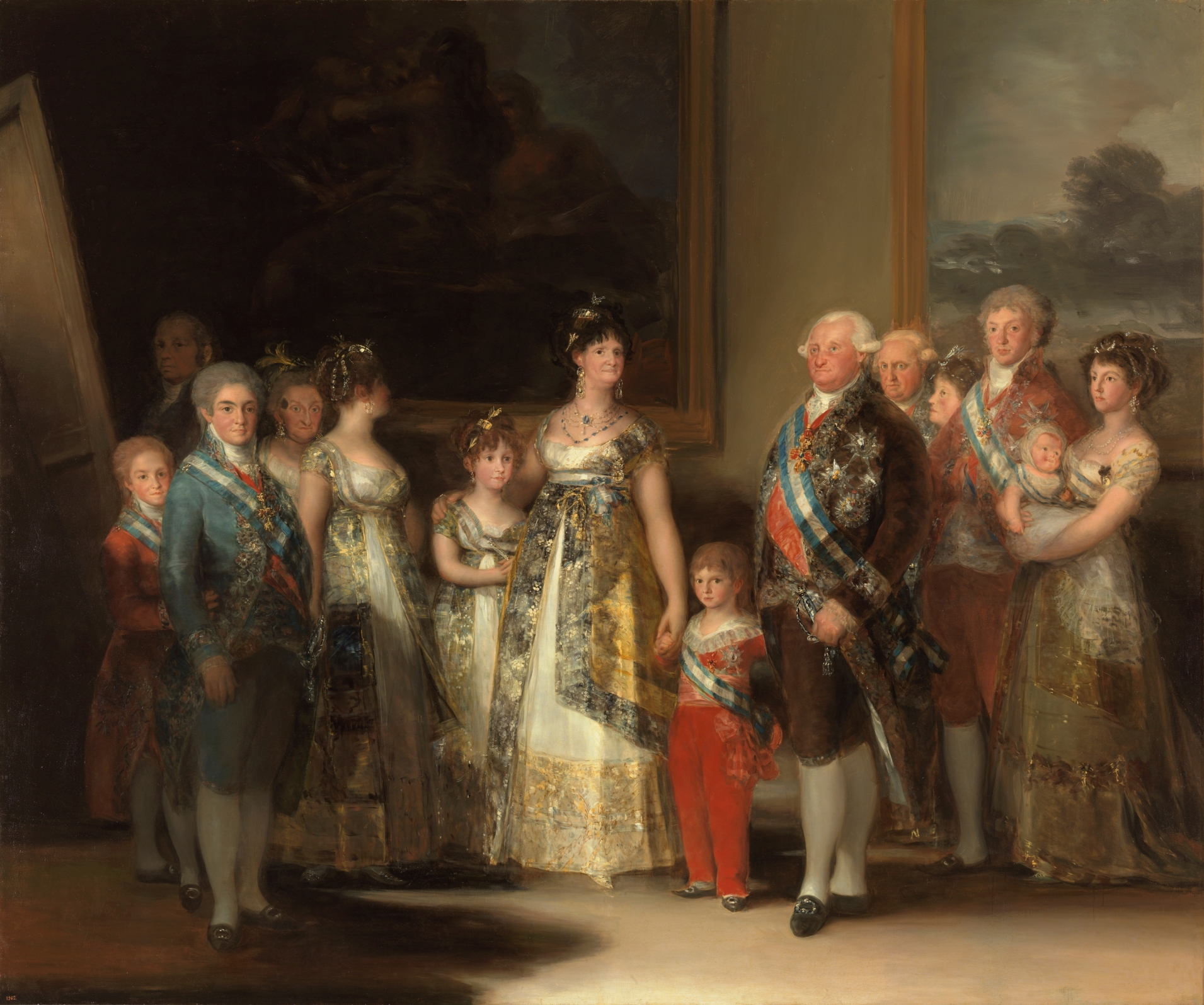
Charles IV of Spain and His Family, 1800–01 (Note: Théophile Gautier described the figures as looking like "the corner baker and his wife after they won the lottery".)

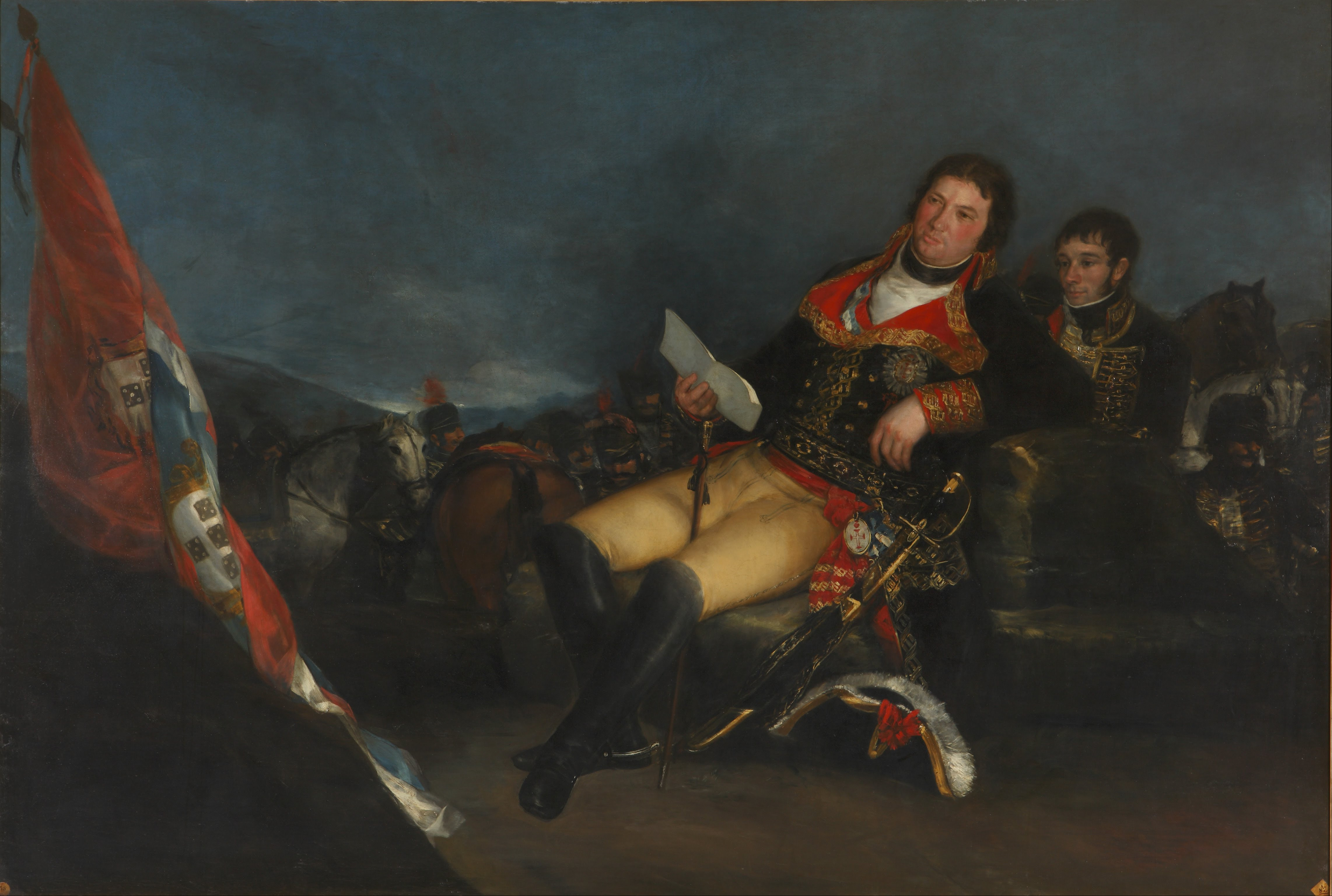
Portrait of Manuel Godoy, 1801. Real Academia de Bellas Artes de San Fernando

== Middle period (1793–1799) ==
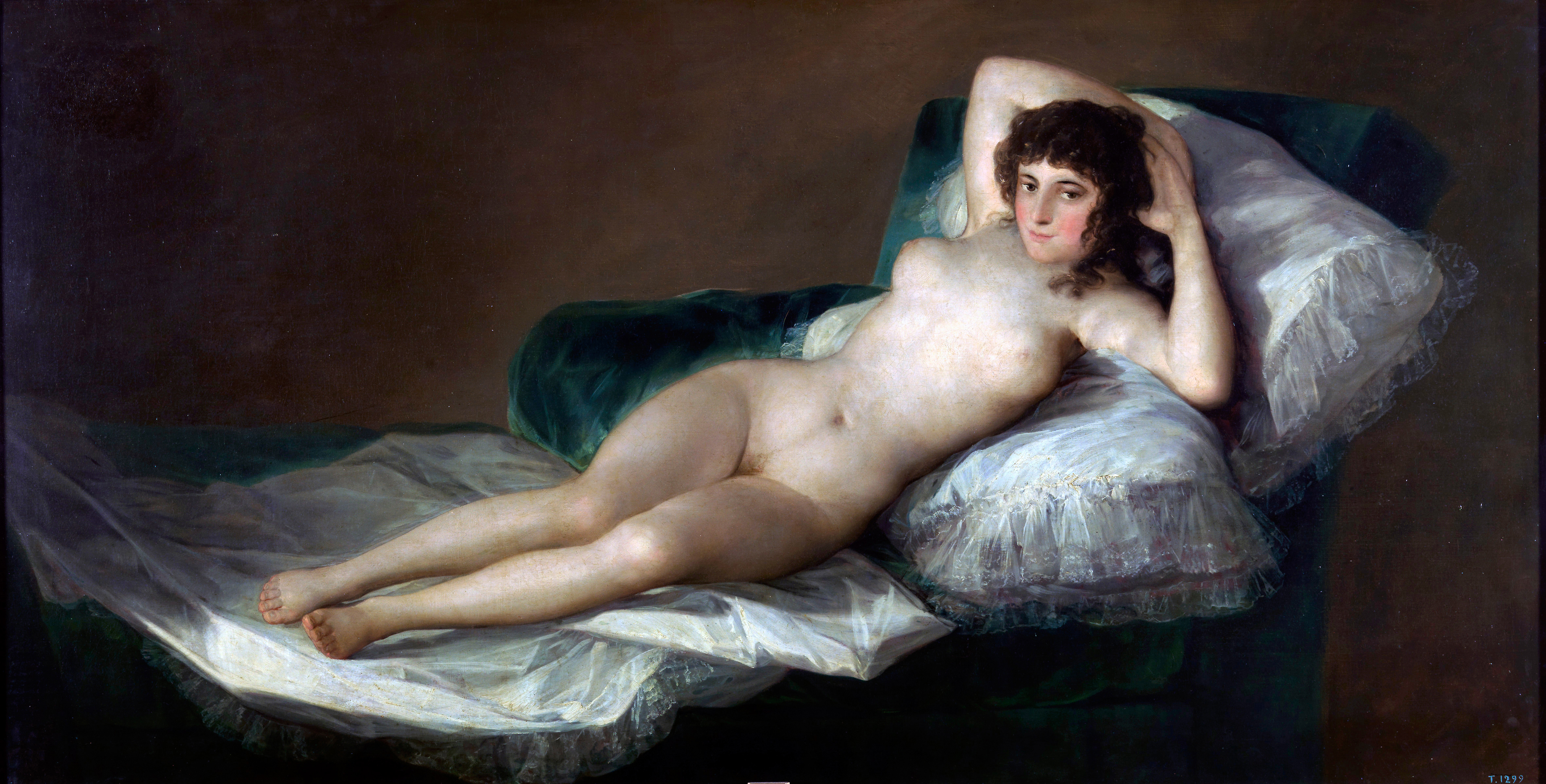
La maja desnuda, 1790–1800

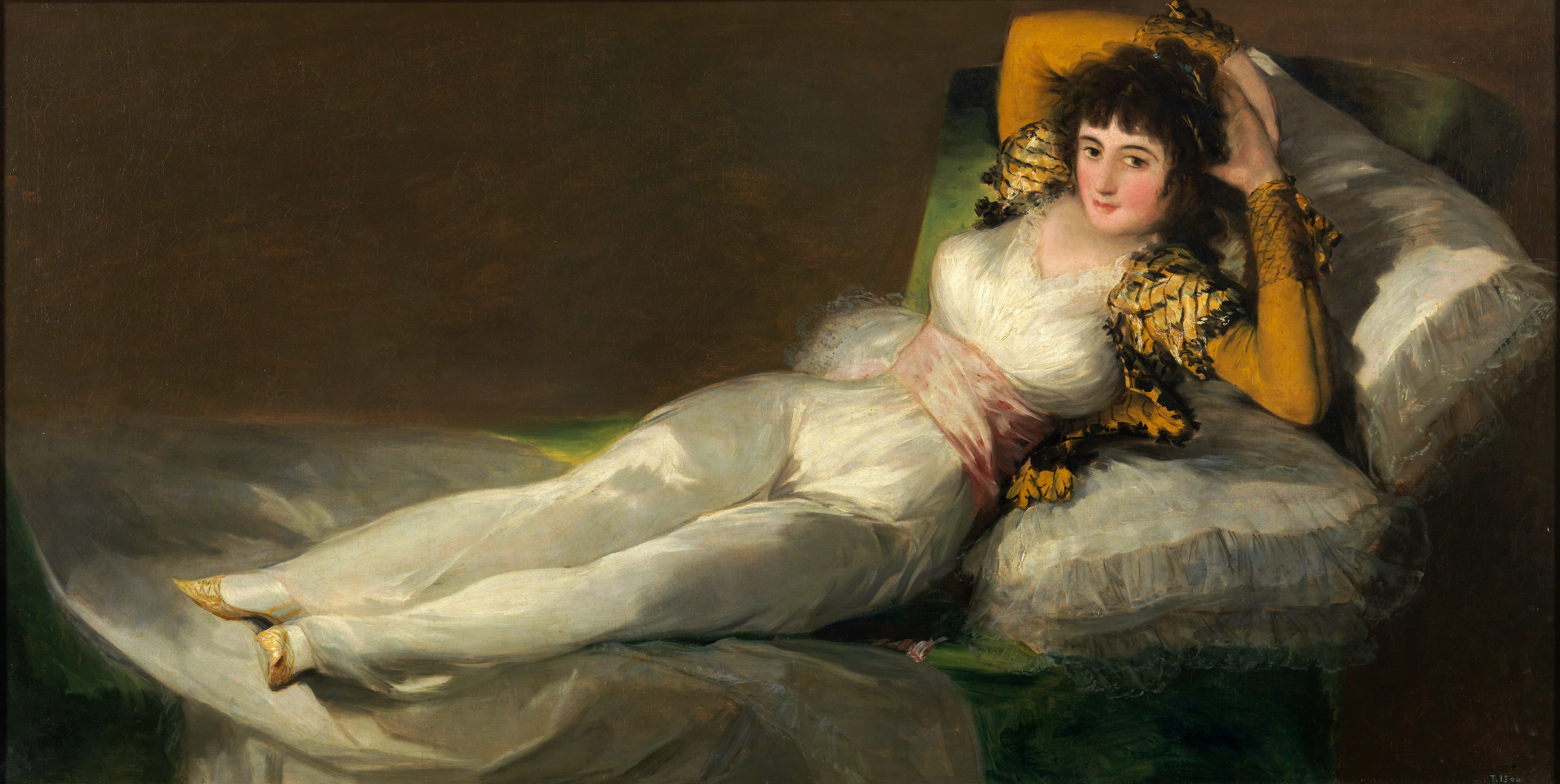
La maja vestida, 1800–1805

La Maja Desnuda (La maja desnuda) has been described as "the first totally profane life-size female nude in Western art" without pretense to allegorical or mythological meaning. The identity of the Majas is uncertain. The most popularly cited models are the Duchess of Alba, with whom Goya was sometimes thought to have had an affair, and Pepita Tudó, mistress of Manuel de Godoy. Neither theory has been verified, and it remains as likely that the paintings represent an idealized composite. The paintings were never publicly exhibited during Goya's lifetime and were owned by Godoy. In 1808 all Godoy's property was seized by Ferdinand VII after his fall from power and exile, and in 1813 the Inquisition confiscated both works as 'obscene', returning them in 1836 to the Academy of Fine Arts of San Fernando.

In 1798 he painted luminous and airy scenes for the pendentives and cupola of the Real Ermita (Chapel) of San Antonio de la Florida in Madrid. His depiction of a miracle of Saint Anthony of Padua is devoid of the customary angels and instead treats the miracle as if it were a theatrical event performed by ordinary people.

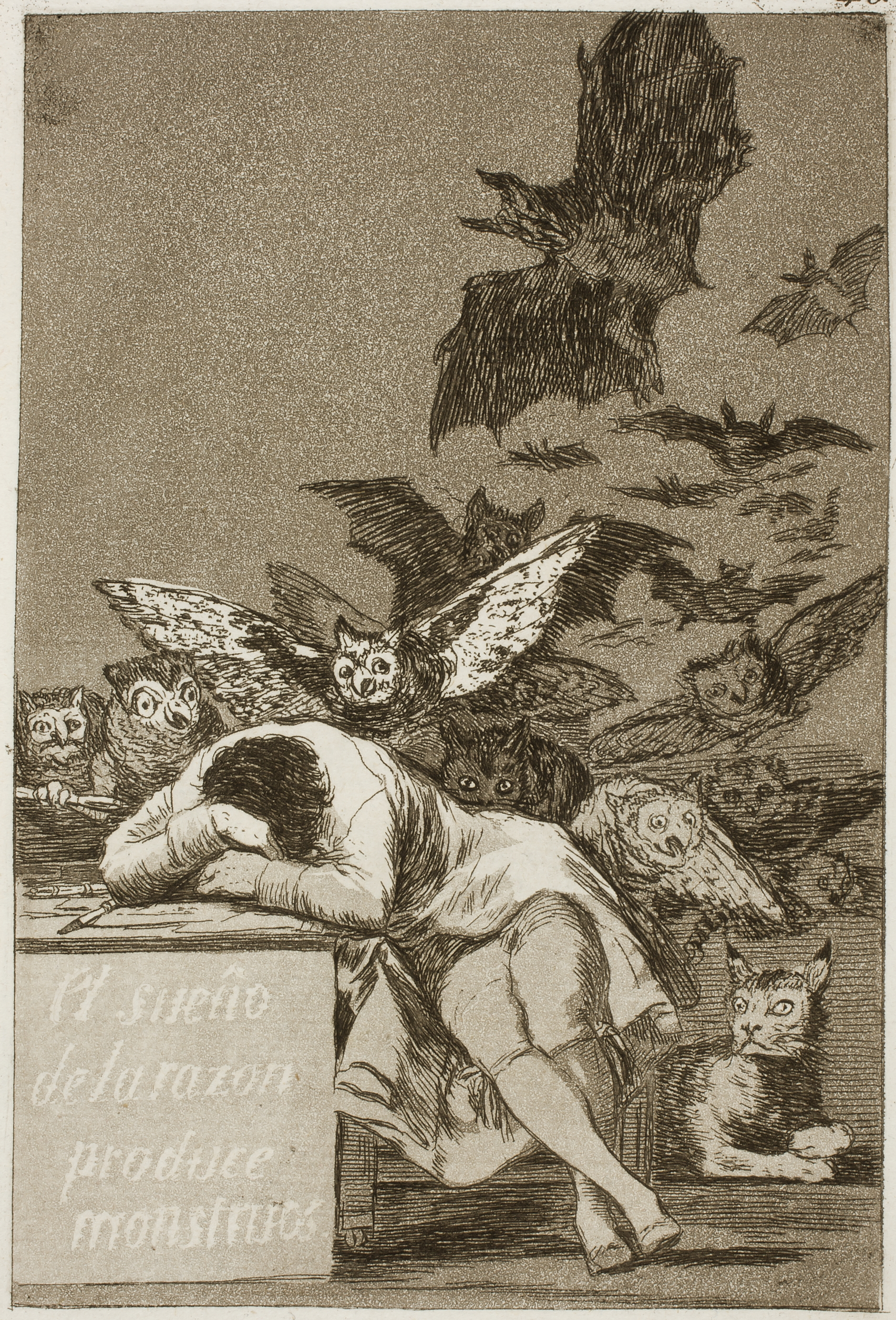
The Sleep of Reason Produces Monsters, c. 1797, 21.5 cm × 15 cm (8 1/2 in × 5 7/8 in)

At some time between late 1792 and early 1793, an undiagnosed illness left Goya deaf. He became withdrawn and introspective while the direction and tone of his work changed. He began the series of aquatinted etchings, published in 1799 as the Caprichos—completed in parallel with the more official commissions of portraits and religious paintings. In 1799 Goya published 80 Caprichos prints depicting what he described as "the innumerable foibles and follies to be found in any civilized society, and from the common prejudices and deceitful practices which custom, ignorance, or self-interest have made usual". The visions in these prints are partly explained by the caption "The sleep of reason produces monsters". Yet these are not solely bleak; they demonstrate the artist's sharp satirical wit, as in Capricho number 52, What a Tailor Can Do!

While convalescing between 1793 and 1794, Goya completed a set of eleven small pictures painted on tin that marked a significant change in the tone and subject matter of his art, and drew from the dark and dramatic realms of fantasy nightmare. Yard with Lunatics is a vision of loneliness, fear and social alienation. The condemnation of brutality towards prisoners (whether criminal or insane) is a subject that Goya assayed in later works that focused on the degradation of the human figure. It was one of the first of Goya's mid-1790s cabinet paintings, in which his earlier search for ideal beauty gave way to an examination of the relationship between naturalism and fantasy that would preoccupy him for the rest of his career. He was undergoing a nervous breakdown and entering prolonged physical illness, and admitted that the series was created to reflect his own self-doubt, anxiety and fear that he was losing his mind. Goya wrote that the works served "to occupy my imagination, tormented as it is by contemplation of my sufferings." The series, he said, consisted of pictures which "normally find no place in commissioned works".

Goya's physical and mental breakdown seems to have happened a few weeks after the French declaration of war on Spain. A contemporary reported, "The noises in his head and deafness aren't improving, yet his vision is much better and he is back in control of his balance." These symptoms may indicate a prolonged viral encephalitis, or possibly a series of miniature strokes resulting from high blood pressure and which affected the hearing and balance centres of the brain. Symptoms of tinnitus, episodes of imbalance and progressive deafness are typical of Ménière's disease. It is possible that Goya had cumulative lead poisoning, as he used massive amounts of lead white—which he ground himself—in his paintings, both as a canvas primer and as a primary colour.

Other postmortem diagnostic assessments include Susac's syndrome or may point toward paranoid dementia, possibly due to brain trauma, as evidenced by marked changes in his work after his recovery, culminating in the "black" paintings. Art historians have noted Goya's singular ability to express his personal demons as horrific and fantastic imagery that speaks universally, and allows his audience to find its own catharsis in the images.

== Peninsular War (1808–1814) ==
The French army invaded Spain in 1808, leading to the Peninsular War of 1808–1814. The extent of Goya's involvement with the court of the "intruder king", Joseph I, the brother of Napoleon Bonaparte, is not known; he painted works for French patrons and sympathisers, but kept neutral during the fighting. After the restoration of the Spanish King Ferdinand VII in 1814, Goya denied any involvement with the French. By the time of his wife Josefa's death in 1812, he was painting The Second of May 1808 and The Third of May 1808, and preparing the series of etchings later known as The Disasters of War (Los desastres de la guerra). Ferdinand VII returned to Spain in 1814 but relations with Goya were not cordial. The artist completed portraits of the king for a variety of ministries, but not for the king himself.

Although Goya did not make his intention known when creating The Disasters of War, art historians view them as a visual protest against the violence of the 1808 Dos de Mayo Uprising, the subsequent Peninsular War and the move against liberalism in the aftermath of the restoration of the Bourbon monarchy in 1814. The scenes are singularly disturbing, sometimes macabre in their depiction of battlefield horror, and represent an outraged conscience in the face of death and destruction. They were not published until 1863, 35 years after his death. It is likely that only then was it considered politically safe to distribute a sequence of artworks criticising both the French and restored Bourbons.

The first 47 plates in the series focus on incidents from the war and show the consequences of the conflict on individual soldiers and civilians. The middle series (plates 48 to 64) record the effects of the famine that hit Madrid in 1811–12, before the city was liberated from the French. The final 17 reflect the bitter disappointment of liberals when the restored Bourbon monarchy, encouraged by the Catholic hierarchy, rejected the Spanish Constitution of 1812 and opposed both state and religious reform. Since their first publication, Goya's scenes of atrocities, starvation, degradation and humiliation have been described as the "prodigious flowering of rage".

The Third of May 1808, 1814. Oil on canvas, 266 cm × 345 cm (105 in × 136 in). Museo del Prado, Madrid

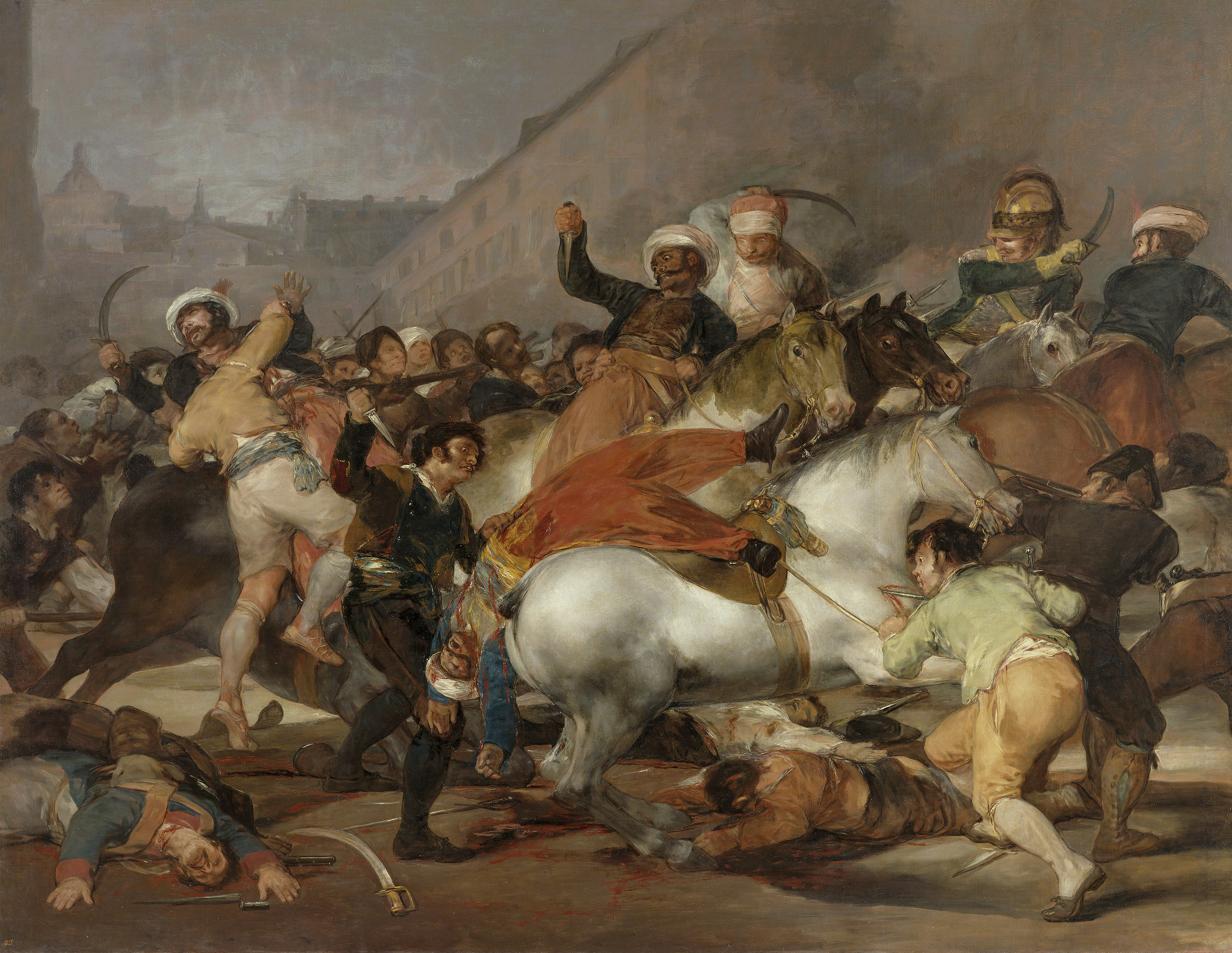
The Second of May 1808, 1814

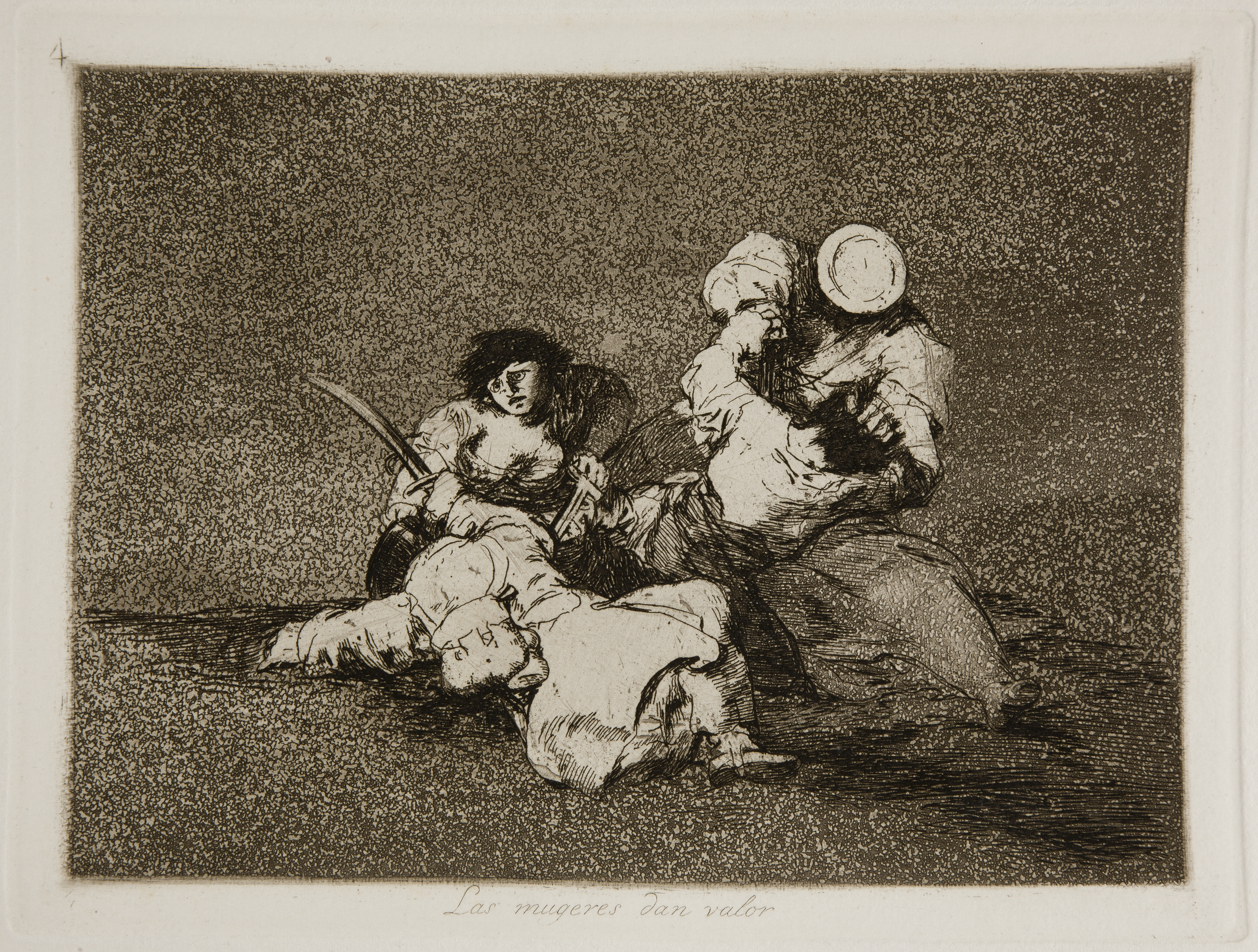
Plate 4: Las mujeres dan valor (The women are courageous). This plate depicts a struggle between a group of civilians fighting soldiers.

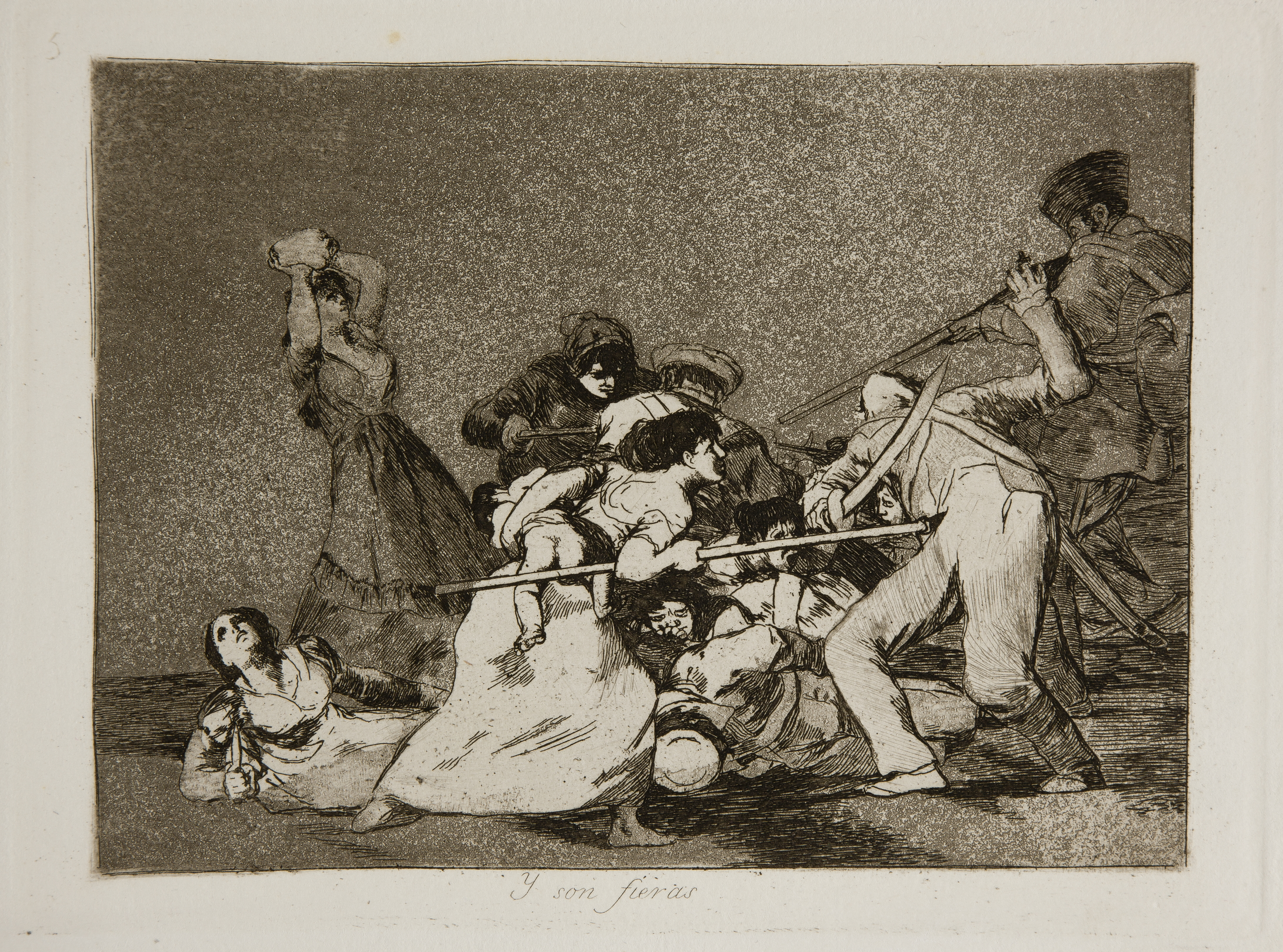
Plate 5: Y son fieras (And they are fierce or And they fight like wild beasts). Civilian women fight against soldiers with spears and rocks.

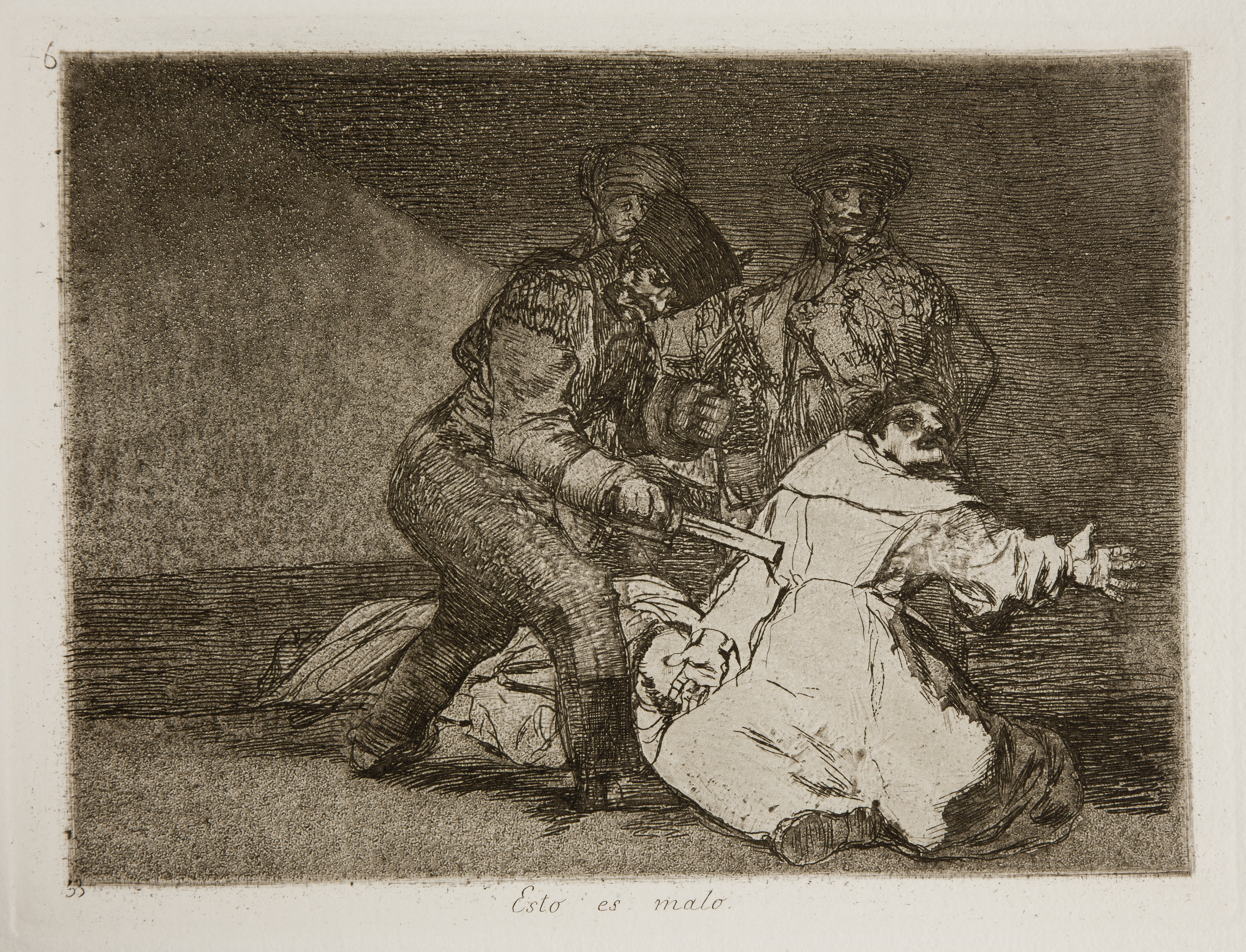
Plate 46: Esto es malo (This is bad). A monk is killed by French soldiers looting church treasures. A rare sympathetic image of clergy, who were generally shown on the side of oppression and injustice.

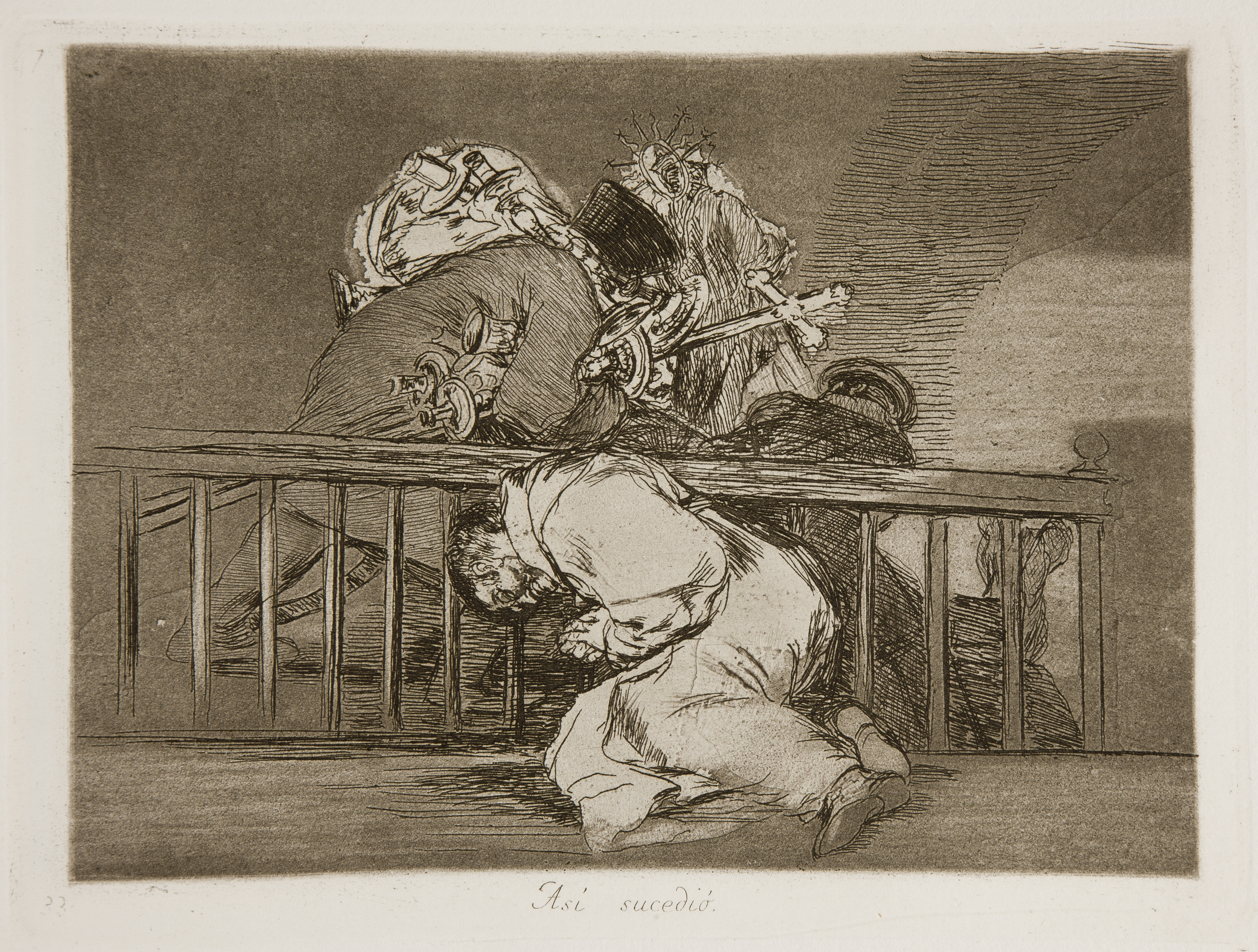
Plate 47: Así sucedió (This is how it happened). The last print in the first group. Murdered monks lie by French soldiers looting church treasures.

His works from 1814 to 1819 are mostly commissioned portraits, but also include the altarpiece of Santa Justa and Santa Rufina for the Cathedral of Seville, the print series of La Tauromaquia depicting scenes from bullfighting, and probably the etchings of Los Disparates.

== Quinta del Sordo and Black Paintings (1819–1822) ==
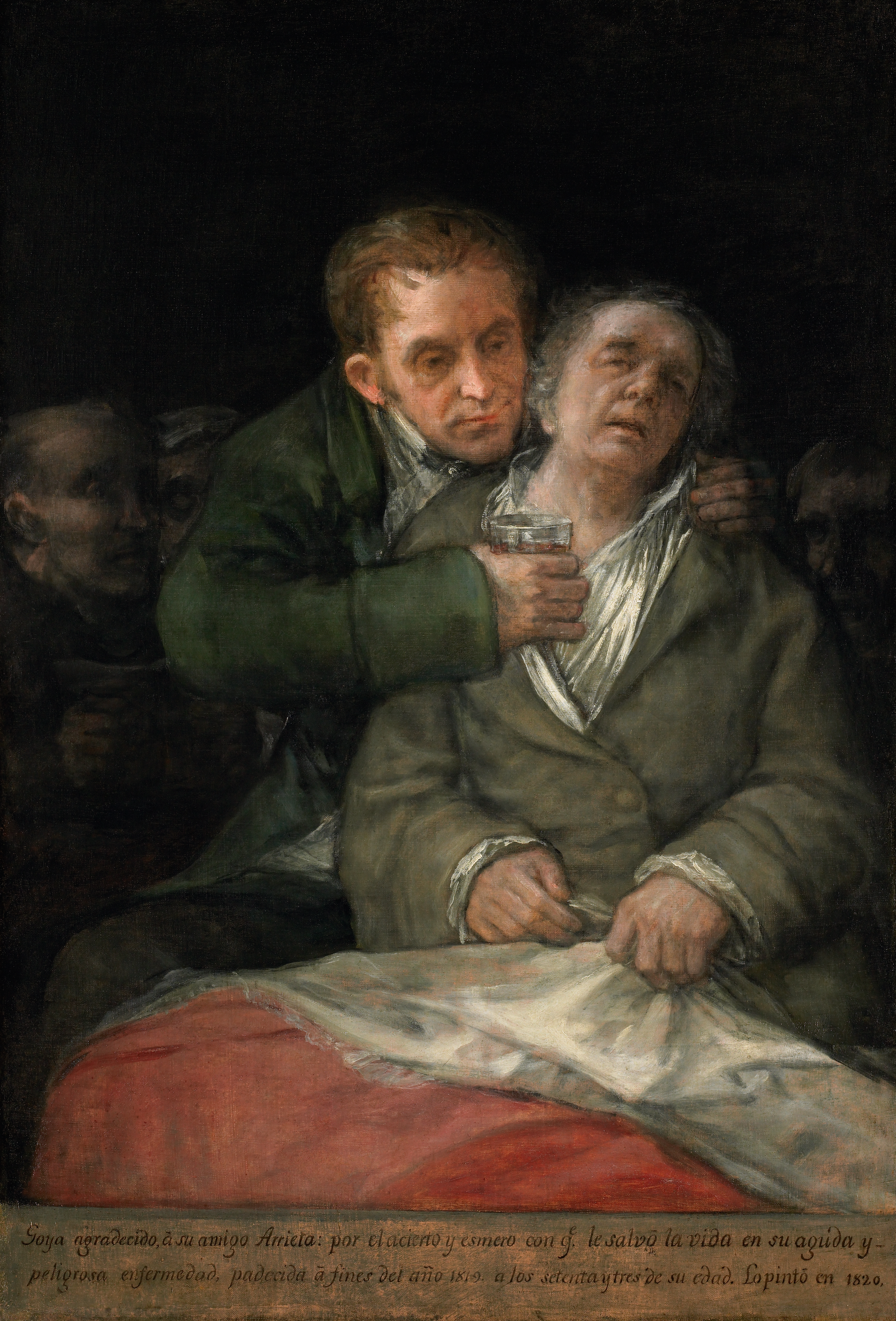
Self-Portrait with Dr Arrieta, c. 1820

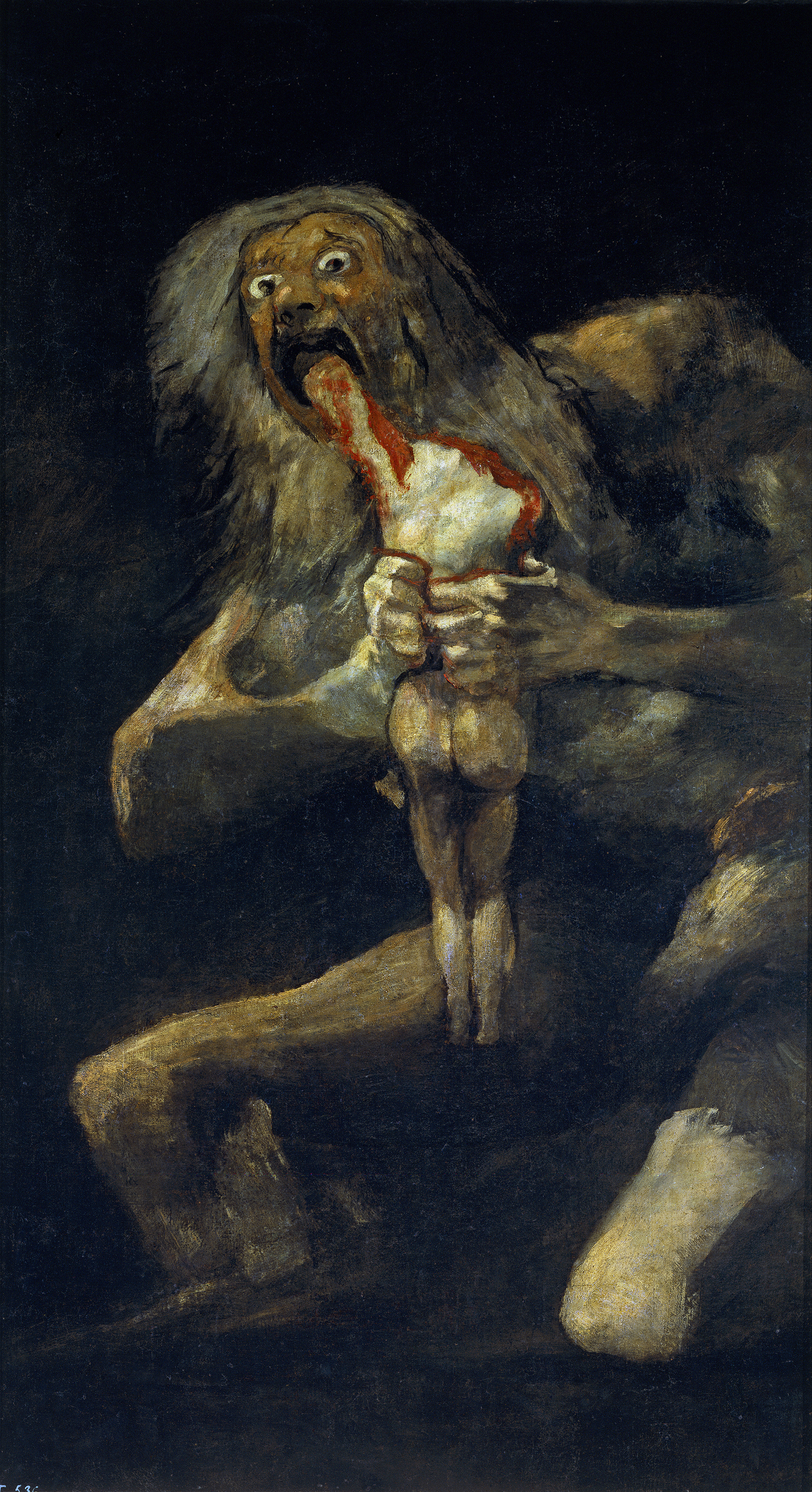
Saturn Devouring His Son, 1819–1823.

Records of Goya's later life are relatively scant, and ever politically aware, he suppressed a number of his works from this period, working instead in private. He was tormented by a dread of old age and fear of madness. Goya had been a successful and royally placed artist, but withdrew from public life during his final years. From the late 1810s he lived in near-solitude outside Madrid in a farmhouse converted into a studio. The house had become known as "La Quinta del Sordo" (The House of the Deaf Man), after the nearest farmhouse that had coincidentally also belonged to a deaf man.

Art historians assume Goya felt alienated from the social and political trends that followed the 1814 restoration of the Bourbon monarchy, and that he viewed these developments as reactionary means of social control. In his unpublished art he seems to have railed against what he saw as a tactical retreat into Medievalism. It is thought that he had hoped for political and religious reform, but, like many liberals of the time, became disillusioned when the restored Bourbon monarchy and Catholic hierarchy rejected the Spanish Constitution of 1812.

At the age of 75, alone and in mental and physical despair, he completed the work of his 14 Black Paintings, (Note: A contemporary inventory compiled by Goya's friend, the painter Antonio de Brugada, records 15. See Lubow, 2003) all of which were executed in oil directly onto the plaster walls of his house. Goya did not intend for the paintings to be exhibited, did not write of them, (Note: As he had with the "Caprichos" and "The Disasters of War" series. Licht (1979), 159) and likely never spoke of them. Around 1874, 50 years after his death, they were taken down and transferred to a canvas support by owner Baron Frédéric Émile d'Erlanger. Many of the works were significantly altered during the restoration, and in the words of Arthur Lubow what remain are "at best a crude facsimile of what Goya painted." The effects of time on the murals, coupled with the inevitable damage caused by the delicate operation of mounting the crumbling plaster on canvas, meant that most of the murals suffered extensive damage and loss of paint. Today, they are on permanent display at the Museo del Prado, Madrid.

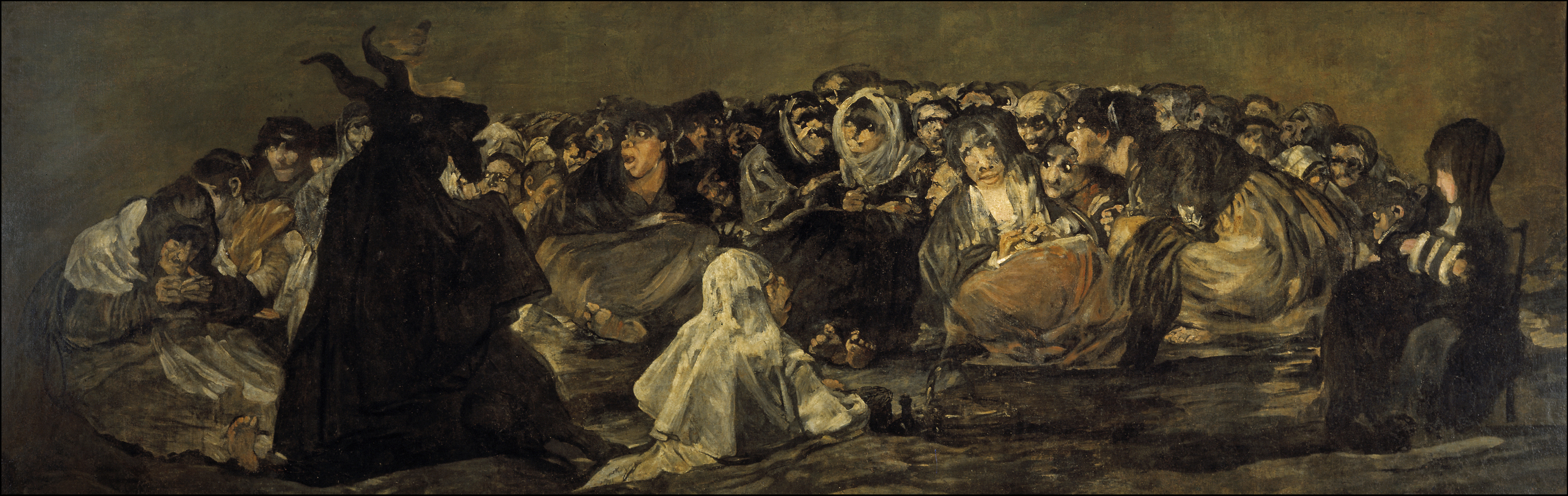
Witches' Sabbath or Aquelarre is one of 14 from the Black Paintings series.

== Bordeaux (October 1824 – 1828) ==
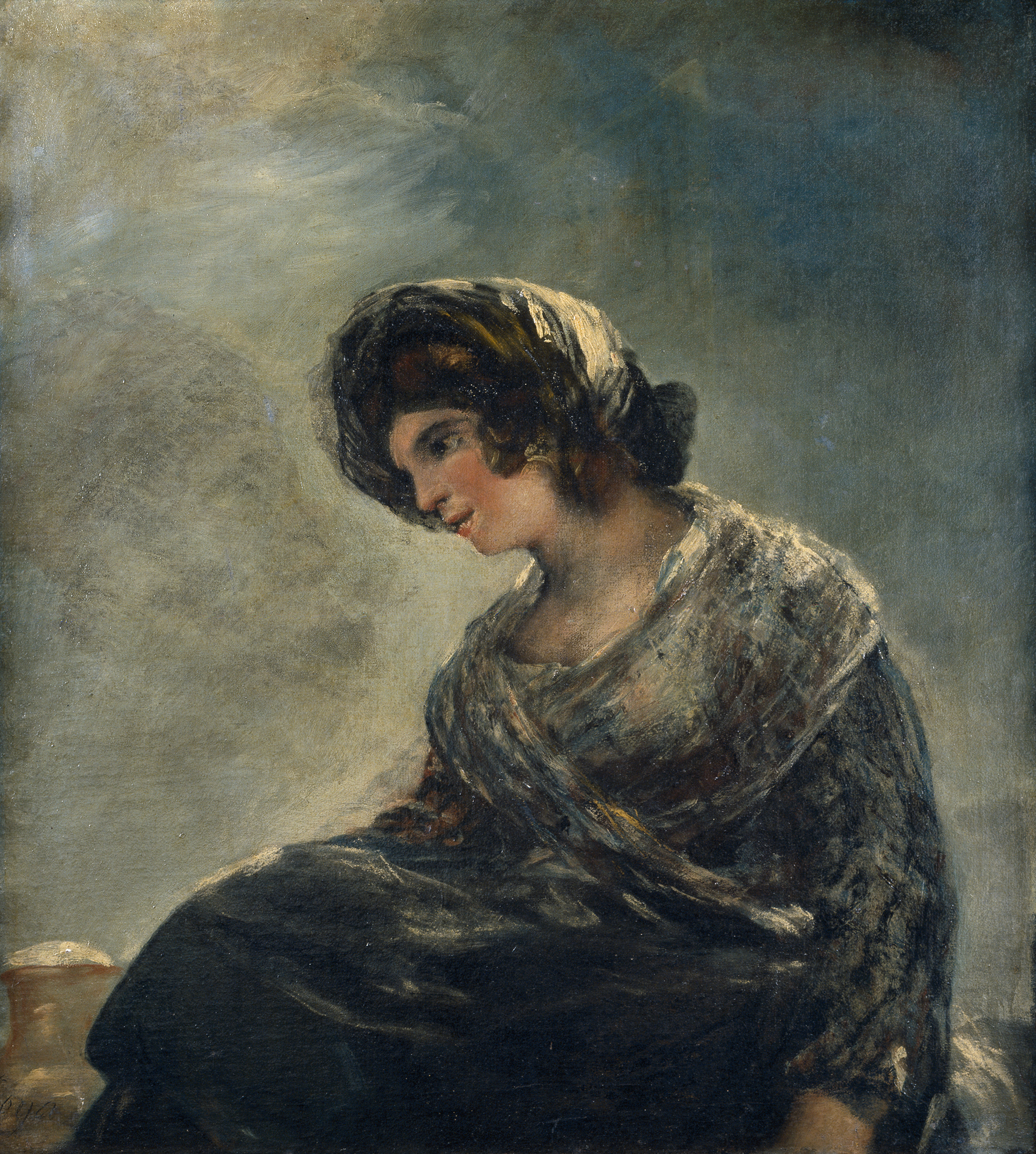
The Milkmaid of Bordeaux, 1825–27, is the third and final Goya portrait which may depict Leocadia Weiss.

Leocadia Weiss (née Zorrilla, 1790–1856), the artist's maid, younger by 35 years, and a distant relative, lived with and cared for Goya after Bayeu's death. She stayed with him in his Quinta del Sordo villa until 1824 with her daughter Rosario. Leocadia was probably similar in features to Goya's first wife Josefa Bayeu, to the point that one of his well-known portraits bears the cautious title of Josefa Bayeu (or Leocadia Weiss).

Not much is known about her beyond her fiery temperament. She was likely related to the Goicoechea family, a wealthy dynasty into which the artist's son, Javier, had married. It is known that Leocadia had an unhappy marriage with a jeweller, Isidore Weiss, but was separated from him since 1811, after he had accused her of "illicit conduct". She had two children before that time, and bore a third, Rosario, in 1814 when she was 26. Isidore was not the father, and it has often been speculated—although with little firm evidence—that the child belonged to Goya. There has been much speculation that Goya and Weiss were romantically linked; however, it is more likely the affection between them was sentimental.

Goya died on 16 April 1828. Leocadia was left nothing in Goya's will; mistresses were often omitted in such circumstances, but it is also likely that he did not want to dwell on his mortality by thinking about or revising his will. She wrote to a number of Goya's friends to complain of her exclusion, but many of her friends were Goya's also and by then were old men or had died, and did not reply. Largely destitute, she moved into rented accommodation, later passing on her copy of the Caprichos for free.

In 1919, Goya's body was re-interred in the Real Ermita de San Antonio de la Florida in Madrid. Goya's skull was missing, a detail the Spanish consul immediately communicated to his superiors in Madrid, who wired back, "Send Goya, with or without head."

== Legacy ==
Goya is often referred to as the last of the Old Masters and the first of the moderns. Among the 20th-century painters influenced by Goya are the Spanish masters Pablo Picasso and Salvador Dalí who drew influence from Los caprichos and the Black Paintings of Goya.

Goya's works were introduced into China shortly before the Second Sino-Japanese War. Goya's The Disasters of War was particularly influential in China, especially for its portrayal of defiance to invasion.

In the 21st century, American postmodern painters such as Michael Zansky and Bradley Rubenstein draw inspiration from "The Sleep of Reason Produces Monsters" (1796–98) and Goya's Black Paintings. Zanksy's "Giants and Dwarf Series" (1990–2002) of large-scale paintings and wood carvings use imagery from Goya.

Goya's influence has extended beyond the visual arts:

- The Spanish composer Enrique Granados wrote a suite for solo piano in 1911 based on Goya's paintings called Goyescas, and later wrote an opera of the same name based on the suite.
- Spanish author Fernando Arrabal's novel The Burial of the Sardine was inspired by Goya's painting.
- Russian poet Andrei Voznesensky's I Am Goya was inspired by Goya's anti-war paintings.
- Video Games such as Blasphemous and Impasto was based on the works of Goya.

In 2024, an extensive exhibition of Goya's etchings was held at the Norton Simon Museum in Southern California.

== Films and television ==
- Goya: Crazy Like a Genius (2002), a documentary by Ian MacMillan, presented by Robert Hughes
- Goya's Ghosts (2006), directed by Miloš Forman
- Volavérunt (1999), directed by Bigas Luna and based on the novel by Antonio Larreta
- Goya in Bordeaux (1999), Spanish historical drama film written and directed by Carlos Saura about the life of Francisco de Goya
- Goya or the Hard Way to Enlightenment (1971) (German: Goya – oder der arge Weg der Erkenntnis) is a 1971 East German drama film directed by Konrad Wolf. It was entered into the 7th Moscow International Film Festival where it won a Special Prize. It is based on a novel with the same title by Lion Feuchtwanger.
- The Naked Maja (1958), directed by Henry Koster. A film about the painter Francisco Goya and the Duchess of Alba; Anthony Franciosa played Goya and Ava Gardner played the Duchess.
- Tiempo de ilustrados (Time of the Enlightened) in the series The Ministry of Time. Goya (played by Pedro Casablanc) must repaint La maja desnuda after a cult called the Exterminating Angels destroy it.

== See also ==
- Francisco Goya's tapestry cartoons
- List of works by Francisco Goya
