= María Ana de Pontejos y Sandoval, Marchioness of Pontejos =

Doña María Ana de Pontejos y Sandoval, Marchioness of Pontejos
- Artist: Francisco de Goya
- Year: c. 1786
- Location: National Gallery of Art, Washington, D.C.

Doña María Ana de Pontejos y Sandoval, Marchioness of Pontejos (es: Doña María Ana de Pontejos y Sandoval, marquesa de Pontejos) (1762–18 July 1834) was a patron of the artist Francisco José de Goya y Lucientes. In 1786 at the age of twenty-four, she married the brother of the Count of Floridablanca (Conde de Floridablanca), King Charles III of Spain’s progressive prime minister. At that time, her husband served as Spain's ambassador to Portugal.

In the famous painting by Goya, painted shortly after the wedding, the marchioness is shown dressed in an attire inspired by Queen Marie Antoinette of France. Marie Antoinette was known to like to dress as a shepherdess. The elaborate coiffure, straw sun hat, and flower-trimmed gown imitate the attire at the French court in Versailles. This extravagant, foreign-influenced costume accentuates the marchioness's tightly corseted waist, fashionable among Spanish noblewomen. Her erect, regal bearing and aloof gaze derive from Diego Velázquez' royal portraits.

In her right hand, she delicately holds a pink carnation, an emblem of love that is often shown held by brides. The marchioness's pug dog at her feet, with its ribbons and bells, echoes the stiff, doll-like pose of its mistress.

Goya used the outdoors as a setting. In the background, green trees can be seen, which are not very detailed and contrast with the white dress of the marchioness.

== See also ==
- List of works by Francisco Goya
