= Charles IV of Spain and His Family =

Oil painting by Francisco Goya

- La familia de Carlos IV (Spanish)
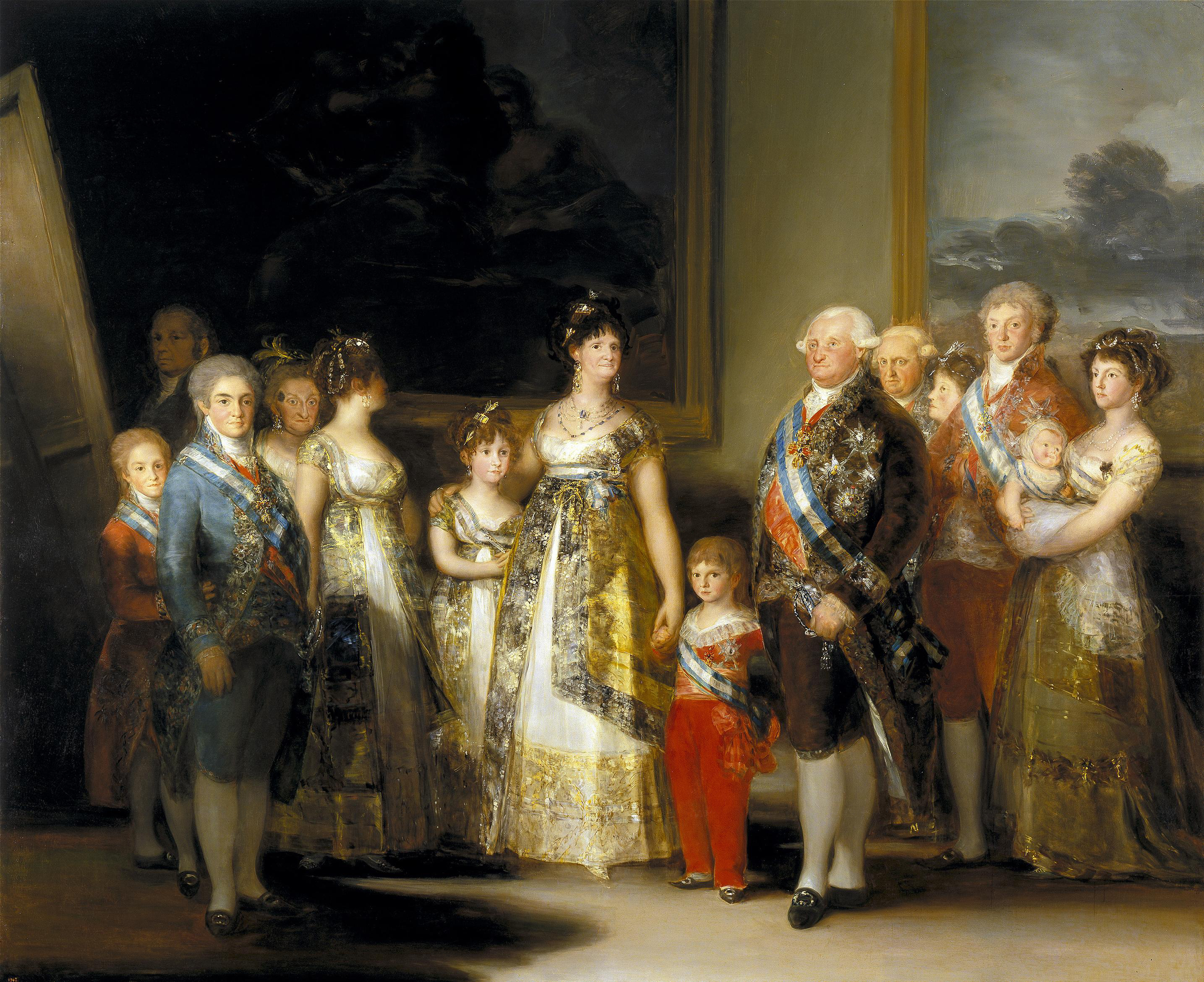
- Artist: Francisco Goya
- Year: 1800–1801
- Medium: Oil on canvas
- Dimensions: 280 cm × 336 cm (110 in × 132 in)
- Location: Museo del Prado; Madrid

Charles IV of Spain and His Family is an oil-on-canvas group portrait painting by the Spanish artist Francisco Goya. He began work on the painting in 1800, shortly after he became First Chamber Painter to the royal family, and completed it in the summer of 1801.

The portrait features life-sized depictions of Charles IV of Spain and his family, ostentatiously dressed in fine costume and jewellery. Foremost in the painting are Charles IV and his wife, Maria Luisa of Parma, who are surrounded by their children and relatives. The family are dressed in the height of contemporary fashionable clothing and lavishly adorned with jewellery and the sashes of the order of Charles III.

The painting was modelled after Louis-Michel van Loo's 1743 Portrait of Felipe V and his Family and Velázquez's Las Meninas, setting the royal subjects in a similarly naturalistic setting as they pose for the artist who is visible at his easel at the left of the canvas.

== Description ==
Diego Velázquez, Las Meninas, 1656

The group portrait was completed the year after Goya first became court painter, the highest position available to a Spanish artist and one previously occupied by Diego Velázquez.

Goya did not say why he chose to model the work after the older master, though the notion of a tradition of Spanish painting did not exist at the time. Perhaps Goya was motivated by the troubled times; after eleven years Spain was still dealing with the implications and aftermath of the French Revolution, which ultimately led to Napoleon's invasion of Spain and his installation of his brother, Joseph Bonaparte, on the Spanish throne in 1808.

The royal family is apparently paying a visit to the artist's studio: Goya can be seen to the left looking outwards towards the viewer. Goya seems to focus his attention on three figures: the Prince of Asturias, i.e. the future Fernando VII, who is dressed in blue, his mother Queen Maria Luisa of Parma, standing in the centre, and King Charles IV. Although a formal portrait, there are indications of intimacy between the family members; Queen Maria Luisa holds the hand of the youngest child. In contrast to Velázquez's Las Meninas, the painting does not show any of the royal family's servants or attendants. More importantly, Goya omits narrative structure: it is simply a painting of people posing for a painting.

As in Las Meninas, the artist is shown working on a canvas, of which only the rear is visible; however, the atmospheric and warm perspective of the palace interior of Velázquez's work is replaced here by a sense of, in the words of Gassier, "imminent suffocation" as the royal family are presented on a "stage facing the public, while in the shadow of the wings the painter, with a grim smile, points and says: 'Look at them and judge for yourself!'"

== Sitters ==
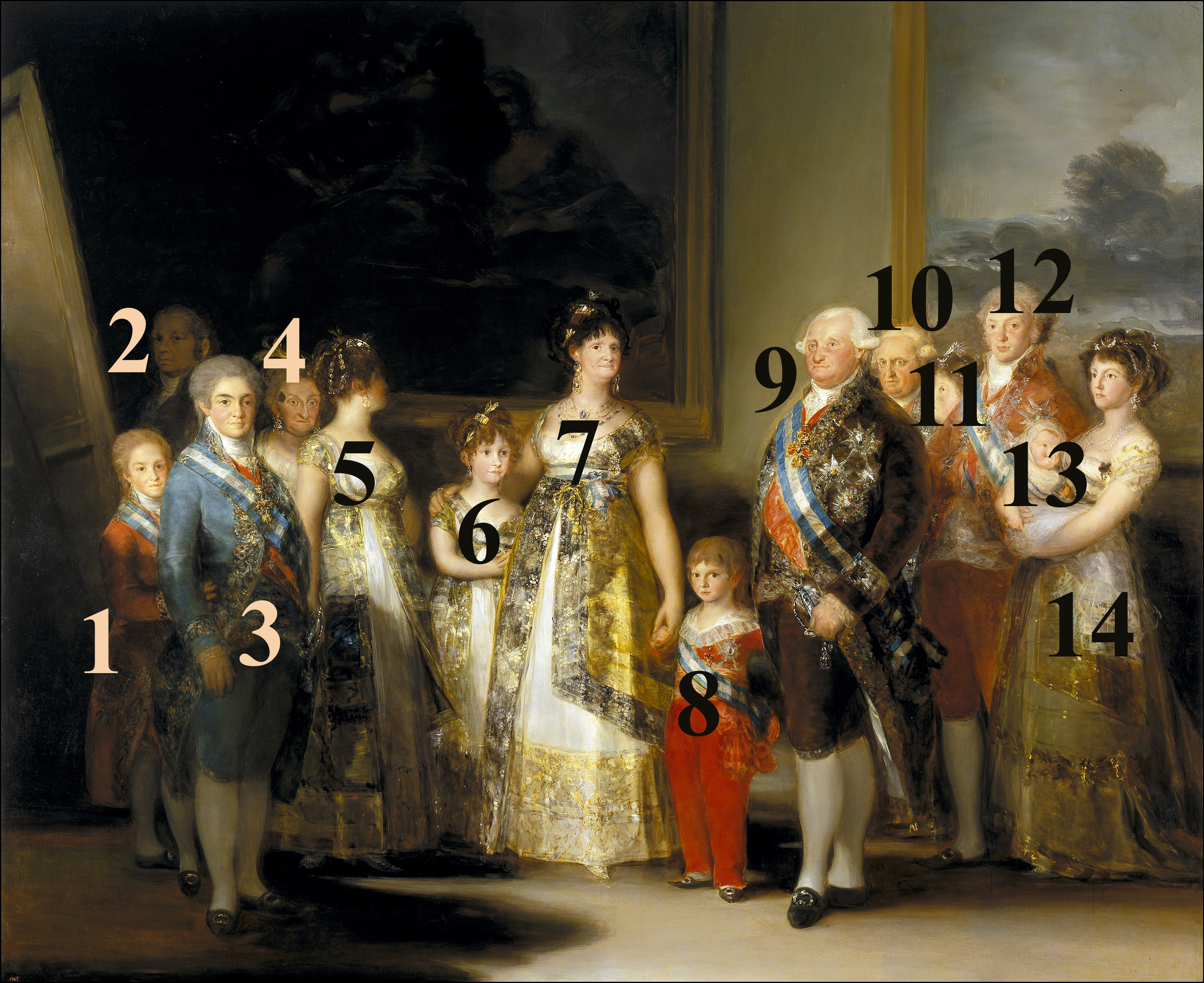
Charles IV of Spain and His Family (with numbers)

The barely visible man in the background shadows at the left is Goya himself (2). Others are, left to right:

- (1) Carlos Maria Isidro (1788–1855) – King's 2nd son
- (3) the future Fernando VII (1784–1833) – King's 1st son
- (4) Maria Josefa (1744–1801) – King's sister
- (5) Maria Antonia of Naples – by the time the work was created, she was yet to marry Fernando VII (but was expected to do so in the near future; that may explain the deliberate concealment of her face)
- (6) María Isabel (1789–1848) – King's daughter
- (7) Maria Luisa of Parma (1751–1819) – King's wife
- (8) Francisco de Paula (1794–1865) – King's youngest son
- (9) Charles IV (1748–1819) – King
- (10) Don Antonio Pascual (1755–1817) – King's brother
- (11) Carlota Joaquina (1775–1830, only part of head visible) – King's eldest daughter
- (12) Don Luis de Parma (1773–1803) – King's son-in-law
- (13) their baby Carlos Luis (1799–1883), the future Duke of Parma
- (14) his wife Maria Luisa (1782–1824) – King's daughter, holding number 13

== Interpretation ==
The French writer Theophile Gautier called it a 'picture of the corner grocer who has just won the lottery' and it has sometimes been suggested that Goya was in some way satirising his subjects. The idea has been dismissed by the art critic Robert Hughes: "This is nonsense. You didn't manage to keep your job as an official court portraitist if you were satirising the people you were painting. No, this is not a send up. If anything it is an act of flattery. For instance on the left, in the blue suit, is one of the most odious little toads in the entire history of Spanish politics, the future King Ferdinand VII, whom Goya actually manages to make quite regal. God knows how he did it, but he has. This is very much an act of respect, almost verging on an act of flattery."

Prominent in Goya's portrait are the domestic intimacy of the royal family and the central role of the queen as a matriarch. She exudes fecundity as she is flanked by her family. Far from a cruel satire, Goya's depiction of the royal family is actually idealized and disregards what the forty-eight-year-old Queen Maria Luisa actually looked like. A Russian ambassador described her eleven years prior to this painting: "Repeated births, illnesses, and perhaps a touch of hereditary illness had taken their toll--the yellow pallor of her skin and the loss of her teeth dealt a final blow to her beauty." The queen's inane smile (formed by crude dentures), her sagging, pallid skin contrasted with sumptuous gown and jewels, and overall appearance of doddering senescence, provide satirical fodder. But this subjective valuation is not only contrary to Goya's public presentation of his skills as an artist but to the artist's own apparent estimation of his consistent royal patron.

John Ciofalo wrote that while "Velázquez sought to bridge the gap between art and the reality of the natural world, Goya sought to bridge the gap between art and the reality of his own mind," a byproduct of the Romantic era. One only has to look at the paintings in Las Meninas that have been identified as real. The paintings in Goya's The Family of Carlos IV have never been identified. One could assume they are indeed products of Goya's mind, of his imagination.

== See also ==
- List of works by Francisco Goya

== Sources ==
External videos
- smARThistory – Goya, The Family of Charles IV

- Buchholz, Elke Linda. Francisco de Goya. Cologne: Könemann, 1999. ISBN 3-8290-2930-6
- Ciofalo, John. The Self-Portraits of Francisco Goya. Cambridge : Cambridge University Press, 2001. ISBN 0-521-77136-6
- Davies, Denny, Hofrichter, Jacobs, Roberts, Simon. Janson's History of Art. Prentice Hall, London, 2011. 824–825. ISBN 0-205-68517-X
- Gassier, Pierre. Goya. Rizzoli International Publications, 1989. ISBN 0-8478-1108-5
- Gassier, Pierre. Goya: Biographical and Critical Study. New York: Skira, 1995. 69–73
- Tomlinson, Janis. From El Greco to Goya: Painting in Spain from 1561-1828. Laurence King, 2012. ISBN 978-1-7806-7028-7
