= Josefa Bayeu (painting) =

Oil painting by Francisco Goya

- Spanish: Retrato de Josefa Bayeu
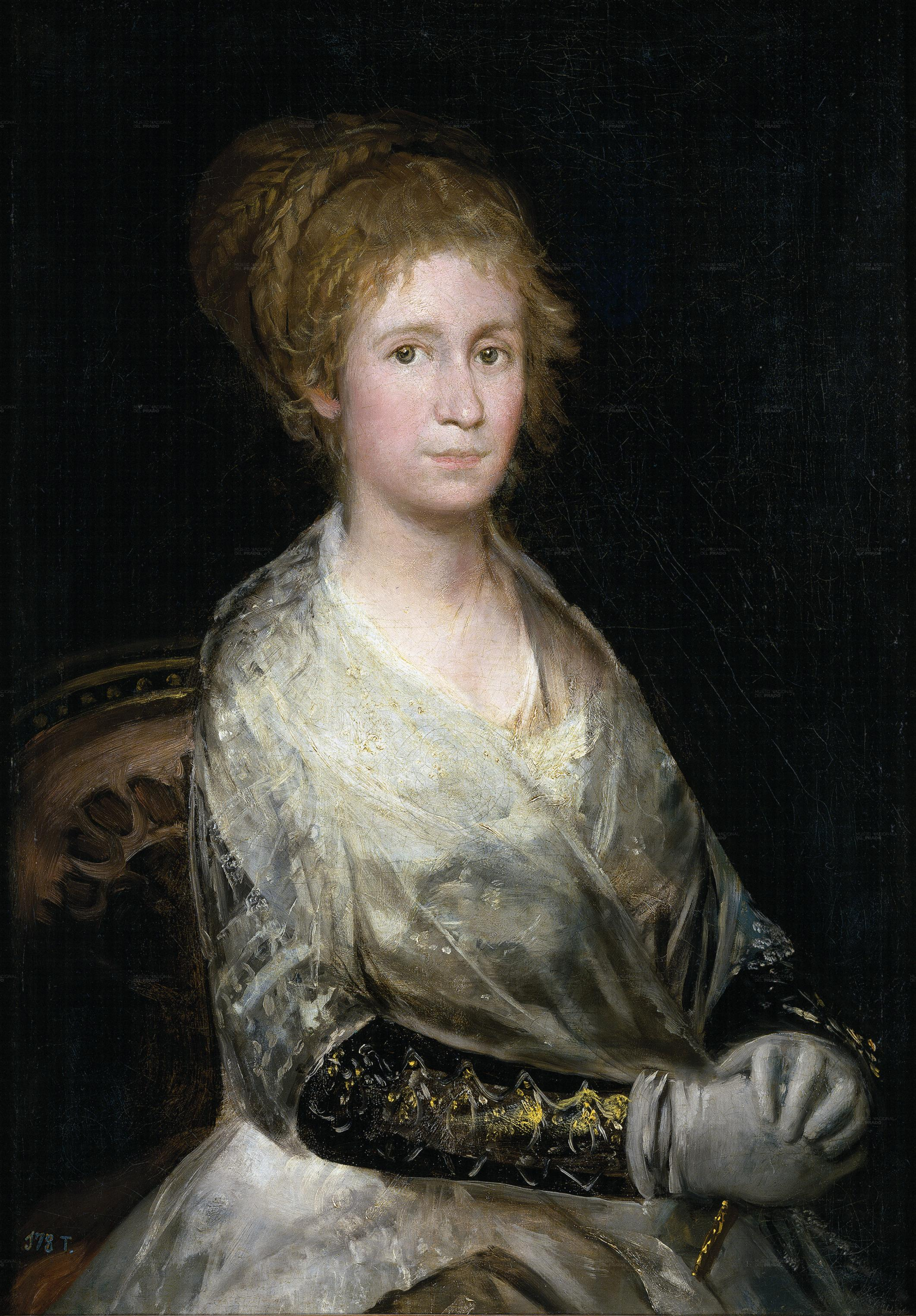
- Artist: Francisco Goya
- Year: 1814–1816
- Medium: oil on plain weave
- Dimensions: 82.5 × 58.2 cm
- Location: Museo del Prado, Madrid

Josefa Bayeu or Leocadia Zorrilla (Spanish: Retrato de Josefa Bayeu or Leocadia Zorrilla) is an oil painting by the Spanish painter Francisco Goya. It is currently housed in the Museo del Prado.

The portrait depicts a young, well-off woman around 30 years of age. Traditionally, it was believed to be a likeness of Josefa Bayeu, the artist's only wife, as it was described this way in one of the inventories conducted at Goya's home and later in museum catalogues. Today, art critics have doubts about this identification, as well as the painting's exact date of creation. It has not been definitively established who the portrait represents. According to art historians from the Museo del Prado, it is most likely a portrait of Leocadia Zorrilla de Weiss, a young noblewoman and Goya's companion after his wife's death.

It was probably not a commissioned work (unlike most of Goya's portraits) but rather a private piece depicting someone from the artist's close circle. Due to the woman's enigmatic smile, the painting has been referred to as "Goya's Mona Lisa".

== Dating ==
The circumstances surrounding the creation of the portrait are not documented. In 1866, it was purchased from Goya's heirs and added to the collection of the Museo de la Trinidad as Portrait of the Painter's Wife, Doña Josefa Bayeu. A work by this title (position no. 14) was listed in the inventory of Goya's works compiled by Antonio Brugada in 1828, shortly after the artist's death. Brugada only noted that it was a half-length portrait; however, there was no description of the painting technique or dimensions, making it impossible to confirm if the inventory entry refers to the portrait now housed at the Museo del Prado. After the Museo de la Trinidad was merged with the Museo del Prado in 1872, the painting continued to be cataloged as Portrait of the Painter's Wife. The traditional date assigned to it was 1798; however, the first doubts emerged in the 1920s, indicating two different time frames: 1798, 1790–1800, and 1808–1812. The advanced painting technique used by Goya, as well as elements such as the woman's attire and hairstyle, suggest a later date. Based on research, art historians at the Museo del Prado now believe the most likely date of creation to be between 1814 and 1816.

If the portrait indeed depicted the artist's wife, the year 1798 seems improbable. Josefa would have been over 50 years old at the time, while the woman portrayed is much younger, no older than 30. During this period, Goya had not yet met Leocadia Weiss, whom he encountered in 1805. In the late 18th century, Spanish nobility typically wore French-style wigs or heavily powdered hair. However, the model's hair is styled in simple braids pinned at the back of her head, with shorter strands framing her face in a style reminiscent of the French Restoration period (1814–1830), suggesting a later date for the portrait. The fashion for natural hairstyles returned after the Peninsular War, fought between 1807 and 1814 against Napoleon. The richness of the woman's attire contrasts with the restrained elegance of other bourgeois women depicted by Goya in the years just before or after the war. The specific use of light and color resembles two of Goya's works from 1815: Self-Portrait at 69 years and Portret Rafaela Esteve Vilelli.

Another clue in determining the date is the fact that the portrait was painted directly over another painting. Art materials such as canvases were expensive, and during the post-war era, they became scarce. Goya complained about this in correspondence with his friend Martín Zapater, although he had donated his own stock of canvases to make bandages for the wounded during the siege and defense of Zaragoza (1808). The reuse of canvas points to the period after 1814, when the war had ended.

== Identification of the portrayed subject ==
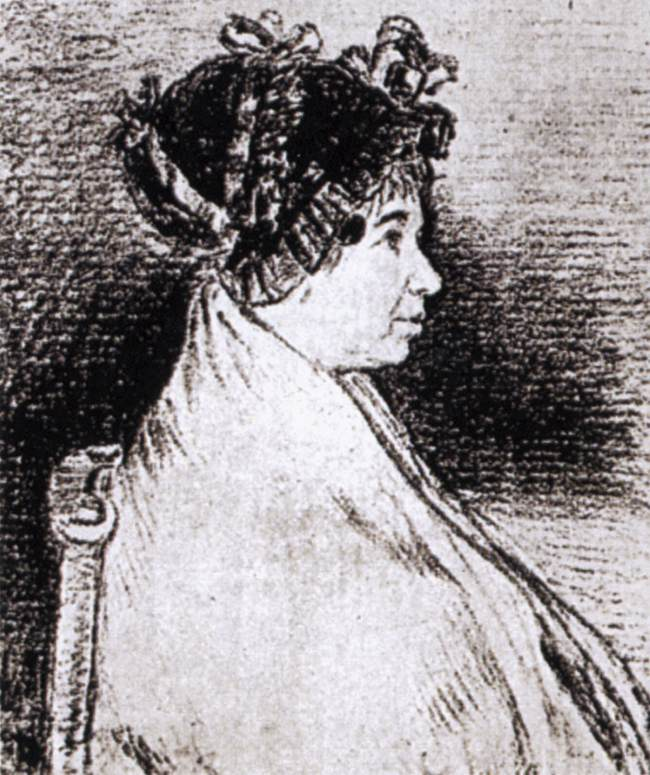
Josefa Bayeu, charcoal sketch, Goya, 1805

=== Josefa Bayeu ===
Josefa Bayeu (1747–1812) was Goya's wife from 1773 until her death in 1812. She came from a wealthy Aragonese family with artistic traditions. Her brother was Francisco Bayeu, a painter who supported Goya's career at the royal court. Despite her background, Josefa was most likely illiterate. Xavier de Salas Bosch describes her as naive, good-natured, and foolish. Goya married her for the connections her family had in artistic circles. Little is known about her life alongside the painter. Josefa became pregnant multiple times (perhaps even 20 times) and suffered miscarriages. Only seven of her children survived infancy, and only her son Francisco Javier reached adulthood. Josefa's repeated motherhood was a significant burden for her, both physically and mentally. The artist rarely mentioned his wife in his extensive correspondence, and she was not his model. The only confirmed image of Josefa that has survived to modern times is a small charcoal sketch from 1805 depicting her profile. It shows nearly 60-year-old Josefa as an aged, slightly stooped woman with sagging skin and a tired expression. She appears calm, with a hint of melancholy in her eyes. She wears a cap on her head and has a woolen shawl draped over her shoulders. Her physiognomy does not correspond to the delicate features of the young lady depicted in the oil portrait.

=== Leokadia Zorrilla de Weiss ===
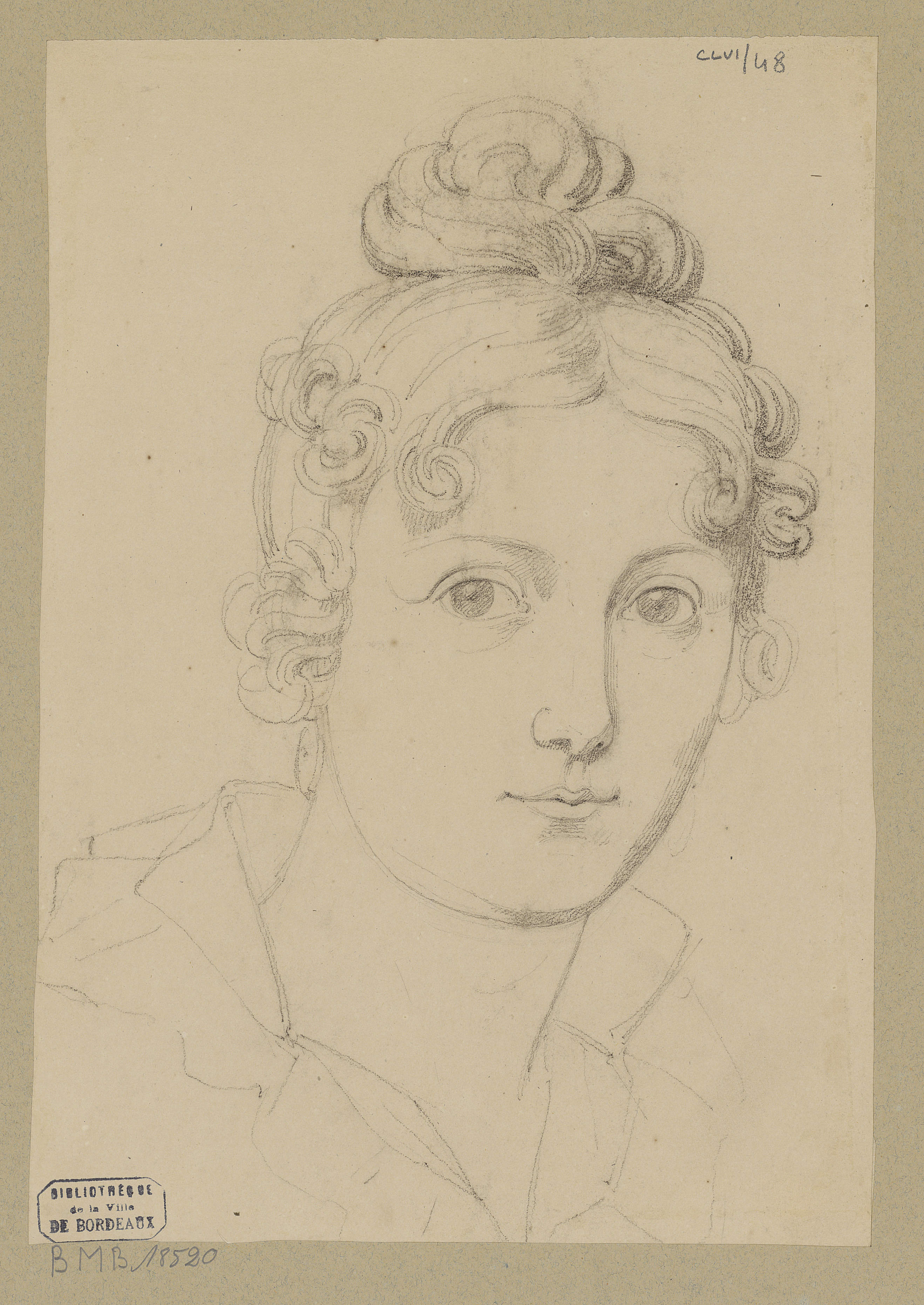
Drawing by Rosario Weiss Zorrilla, possibly depicting her mother, Leokadia

The model for this painting may have been Leokadia Zorrilla de Weiss (1788–1856), who moved in with Goya shortly after his wife's death and cared for him until the end of his life. Leokadia was born in 1788, so during the period suggested by the Museo del Prado for the painting's creation, she would have been from 26 to 28 years old. She was a cousin of Goya's daughter-in-law; they met in 1805 at the wedding of his son Javier and Gumersinda Goicoechea. In 1812, amidst a social scandal, Leokadia divorced her husband, jeweler Isidore Weiss. Her husband accused her of misconduct, while she charged him with squandering her considerable fortune. Leokadia took a position as housekeeper for the widower Goya and was likely also his mistress. In 1819, she moved in with Goya at his estate known as Quinta del Sordo, along with her daughter Rosario, and from 1824 until the artist's death, both accompanied him in exile in Bordeaux. Goya took care of Rosario (who is suspected to be his daughter) and gave her painting lessons. The portrayed woman resembles the figure appearing in Rosario's drawings; it is possible that she practiced drawing her mother. This would support the hypothesis that the painting indeed depicts Leokadia.

== Description of the painting ==
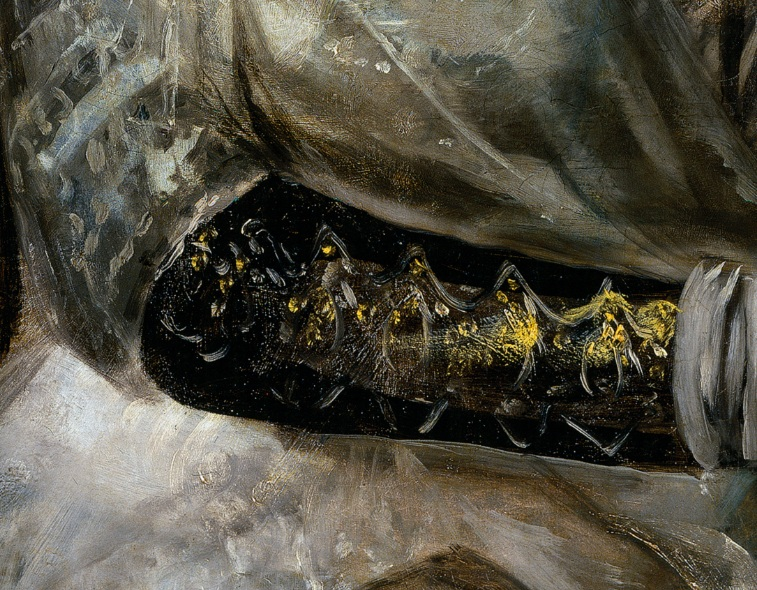
Fragment of the painting shows brushstrokes resembling sketches, characteristic of Goya's style

The woman is depicted against a typical dark, uniform background, often used in Goya's portraits, which allows the viewer's attention to focus entirely on the figure. The only decorative element visible is the ornate chair back on the left. Goya painted the woman's face with particular precision, capturing her smooth, light complexion, subtly highlighted with a blush on her cheeks. Her large, calm eyes amplify her attentive and intelligent gaze. The lips are narrow and pressed together. Her beauty is noble, and the expression on her face is serious. It is very likely a portrait of someone from Goya's close circle, as suggested by the woman's direct and confident posture, indicating mutual trust between the painter and the model.

In contrast to the subtly painted face, the woman's attire lacks detailed attention. The golden embellishments on the black sleeves of her silk dress were created with quick and light brushstrokes, giving the impression of a sketch, almost impressionistic. Similarly, energetic strokes form the light, transparent shawl that covers the dress. A minimal but precise brushstroke marks the ear. The hands, dressed in white gloves, hold the golden handle of an indeterminate object – perhaps an umbrella or a cane. A frequent motif in Goya's female portraits was a fan, and according to Count Viñaza, the model is holding this item, resting it against the dress. However, the strength of the model's gesture seems to exclude this possibility. The delicate light that envelops the woman gives her figure a remarkable realism.

A copy of this painting exists in the collection of the heirs of Manuel Lorenzo Pardo in Madrid.

== X-ray examination ==
After conducting an X-ray examination, it was discovered that underneath the painting lies another female portrait, also set against a dark background. By analyzing the attire and hairstyle of the previous model, she was identified as Juana García Ugalde, a well-known Spanish theater actress. Based on this, it was determined that her likeness was painted in the second half of the 1790s. Like the La Tirana, she held a piece of paper with the lines of her character in her hand, a typical attribute in portraits of actors. Juana died at the beginning of the 19th century. At the time of her death, she was in a poor financial situation, likely unable to pay for the already completed painting, which thus remained in Goya's possession. The artist reused the canvas by painting directly over the previous portrait, without first applying a new undercoat or covering it up. In some areas, the blue color of the actress' dress is visible, showing through the new portrait. Goya would have likely covered the previous painting more thoroughly if the new portrait had been commissioned by an important client rather than for someone close to him.

== Provenance ==
The portrait was inherited by Goya's direct descendants – his son Javier and grandson Mariano. After Javier's death, the division of the painter's estate was handled by Federico Madrazo. Mariano, who gradually sold off his grandfather's estate to pay off his debts, sold the painting to Román Garreta y Huerto, Madrazo's brother-in-law. Later, the painting was purchased by royal decree on 5 April 1866 for 300 escudos by the Museo de la Trinidad, along with Self-Portrait at 69 years from 1815 and Exorcism, attributed to Goya. This museum was merged with the Museo del Prado, where the painting has been located since 1872. The blue marking in the lower left corner, numbered 178.T, comes from the inventory of the Museo de la Trinidad.
