= Self-Portrait at 69 years =

Painting by Francisco Goya

- Autorretrato (Spanish)
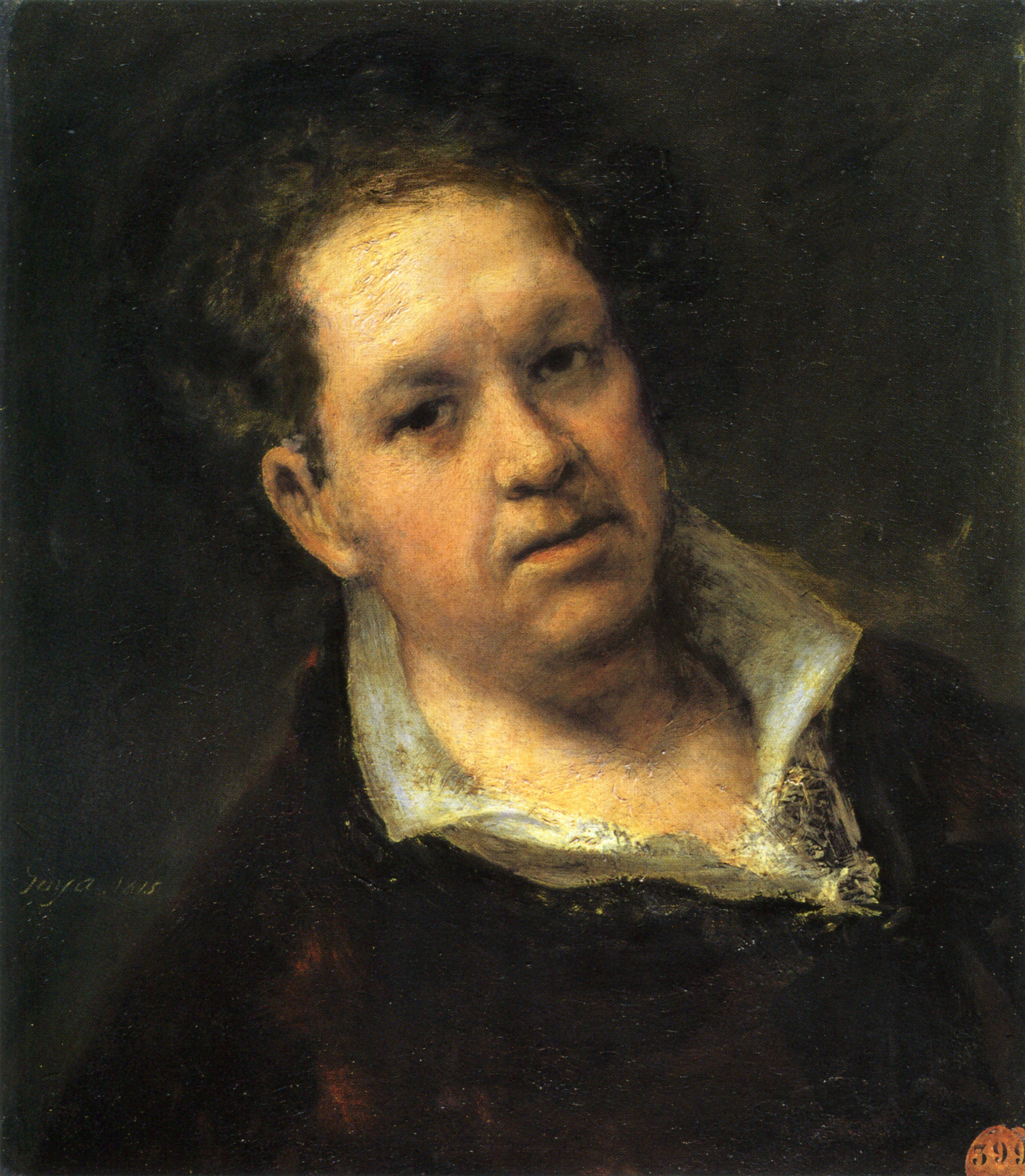
- Artist: Francisco Goya
- Year: 1815
- Medium: oil on panel
- Dimensions: 46 × 51 cm
- Location: Real Academia de Bellas Artes de San Fernando, Madrid

Self-portrait at 69 years
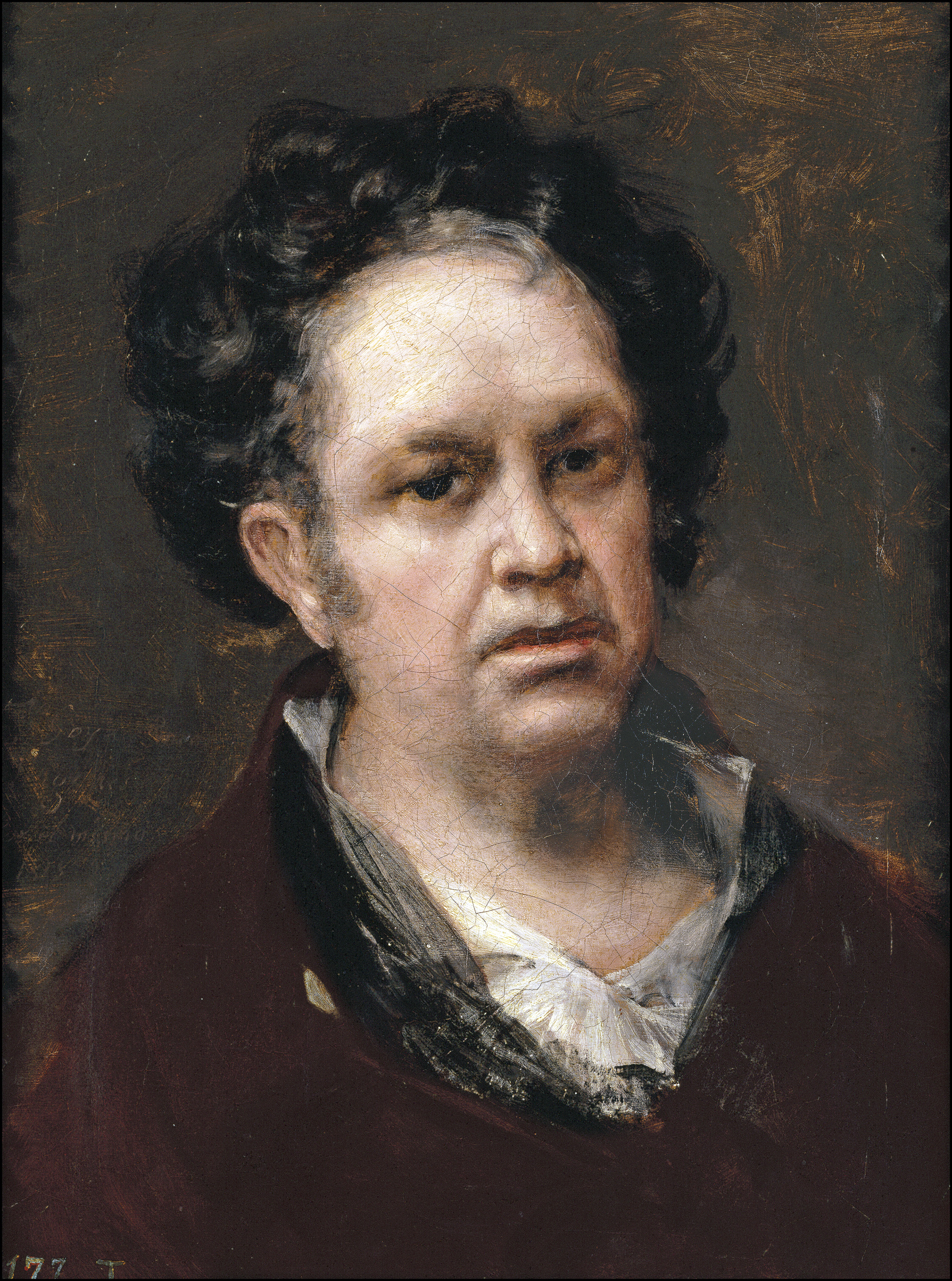
- Artist: Francisco Goya
- Year: 1815
- Medium: oil on canvas
- Dimensions: 45.8 × 35.6 cm
- Location: Museo del Prado, Madrid

Self-Portrait at 69 Years (Spanish: Autorretrato) is an oil painting by the Spanish painter Francisco Goya. Two original versions of this work have been preserved. One of the paintings, painted on canvas, is housed in the collections of the Prado Museum. The other, created on wood panel, is located in the Real Academia de Bellas Artes de San Fernando in Madrid. Both paintings were created in 1815, in the post-war period, and depict a very similar image of the artist. This is one of the most sincere and direct self-portraits of the painter.

== Goya's self-portraits ==
Throughout his long life, Goya created many self-portraits – at least fifteen are recognized as authentic, with a total of over thirty. He used various techniques: painting, engraving, and drawing. He also portrayed himself in various ways, for example, classically before easels with attributes of the painter: Self-portrait at an Easel modeled after Velázquez and his Las Meninas, and with his important clients: Charles IV of Spain and His Family, The Family of the Infante Don Luis, or José Moñino, 1st Count of Floridablanca and Francisco de Goya. He also appears in religious scenes like The Sermon of Saint Bernardino of Siena, genre scenes like La novillada (The Young Bulls' Fight), in a drawing with his muse, the Duchess of Alba, or in Self-portrait with Dr Arrieta painted as a votive offering. There are also several portraits of Goya executed by other artists, such as by Vicente López (Portrait of Goya at 80 years).

== Circumstances of creation ==
The year 1815, in which these self-portraits were created, falls into a difficult post-war period following the end of the Peninsular War fought against the French. In the years 1811–1812, Madrid suffered a tragic famine. After Ferdinand VII returned to the throne in 1814 and the absolute monarchy was restored, he began a period of accusations of collaboration with the French, interrogations, and purges at the royal court. This brought disappointment to constitutionalists and supporters of the Enlightenment, among whom Goya belonged. The king conducted a process of "purification" in his circle, which also included Goya as the court painter. Ferdinand VII also reinstated the hated Inquisition, much to the dismay of society. In 1815, Goya stood before its tribunal accused of creating "obscene works" (the portrait of The Naked Maja), however, he faced no consequences. His personal situation also changed: in 1812, his wife died; many friends departed, died, or emigrated for fear of political reprisals. He struggled with a shortage of materials in his work, often painting over finished works to reuse the canvas. The color palette he used became dark and almost monochromatic, dominated by browns and blacks. It's possible that Goya created this self-portrait to affirm his artistic capabilities despite adversity.

It is not known whether the Self-portrait at 69 years was created by Goya for himself, for someone in his family or close circle, or on commission. Both versions are signed and dated 1815. The version in the Prado bears an inscription carved by the painter using a brush handle or stylus on fresh paint. The inscription is visible on the left side at the neck level: Fr. Goya Pintor [?] / Aragones / Por el mismo / 1815 (Fr. Goya Painter [?] / Aragonese / By himself / 1815). The date and the full inscription were revealed only in 1993 when the painting underwent conservation and the layer of old varnish was removed (previously only a fragment Fr. Goya / Aragonese / By himself was visible). Previously, this painting was considered a later copy of the version in the Real Academia de Bellas Artes de San Fernando, but the revelation of the date indicates that both were created around the same time. The version in the academy has a shorter inscription Goya 1815 on the left side at the level of the shoulder. It was donated to this institution by the painter's son, Javier, after his father's death. It's possible that the version in the Prado was also intended for one of the academies of fine arts, of which Goya was a member, such as in Valencia or Zaragoza, or another institution, although the painting was never transferred. This would be indicated by the official signature in which the painter identifies himself as Aragonese.

Valentín Carderera, a painter, art collector, and one of the first biographers of Goya, wrote a brief text for the Real Academia de Bellas Artes de San Fernando, analyzing various self-portraits of Goya. In it, he compares the bust from the academy to the Self-portrait with Dr Arrieta, in which the painter portrays himself as suffering from illness, along with his caring physician. Carderera suggested that the self-portrait from the academy was a study for this work, which would explain the backward tilt of the painter's silhouette and the depicted state of mind. Count de Viñaza also regarded this portrait as a sketch, arguing that Goya's head originally rested on a pillow, which the artist later painted over. Similarly, Charles Yriarte cataloged the work as such in 1867. However, the painter's illness began in November 1819, several years after the creation of the bust. This incorrect classification was later rejected by Xavier Desparmet Fitz-Gérald and Aureliano de Beruete.

== Description ==
Of all the known self-portraits of Goya, this is one of the most sincere and direct. The painter depicted himself at the age of 69, in a bust placed against a dark background in shades of brown. He wears a kind of robe made of dark reddish-brown velvet, which painters in the 18th and 19th centuries would often wear for self-portraits, such as William Hogarth's Painter and his Pug. A similar outfit is also worn by his student in the Portrait of Asensio Julià. His appearance is unkempt, and beneath the robe, a loosely buttoned white shirt is visible. The entire intensity of the portrait is focused on the facial features, with little emphasis on the clothing or background. The head is slightly turned to the left, with an intense and somber gaze. The face is surrounded by tousled and graying hair, revealing a high forehead, almost directly facing the viewer. According to the iconographic guidelines of Cesare Ripa, disheveled hair symbolizes the creative genius and imagination of the artist. Goya did not paint typical attributes of his profession for this self-portrait, nor did he emphasize his status with luxurious clothing, making his figure more human and accessible to the viewer.

The older version is likely the one from the academy. The more pronounced tilting of the head, almost diagonally across the painting, is a posture the painter would have assumed while painting at his easel and simultaneously observing himself in the mirror. A visible change was made during painting – he repainted the shirt, which was originally buttoned up to the neck, in favor of a casually open collar. Meanwhile, in the Prado version, he used broad brushstrokes of black paint, partially covering the collar of the shirt. The version from the Prado probably originated as an adaptation of the first, in a more relaxed and experimental style. The figure is positioned more vertically. In the later painting, the painter seems to wear a wig that has slipped slightly back, revealing gray hair. Goya appears tired, sickly, and somewhat nostalgic. His face reflects the long years of work with its joys, sorrows, and troubles. It also betrays his deafness, which has almost isolated him from the outside world. His state of mind is the main difference between this self-portrait and the academy version. In the academy version, Goya does not seem ill, tired, or as old as in the Prado painting. He is calmer and more reflective, yet in this state of intellectual sensitivity, vital energy is manifested. His skin is smoother, more rosy, and appears younger than his 69 years. His lips have lost their former fierceness and severity, showing a compassionate half-smile. The painter seems ready for new adversities, as he has already overcome many. According to Xavier Bray, this is not a study of old age but of the state of mind. Valeriano Bozal believes that, as in many other works of Goya, the true hero is time, which has left its mark on his facial features, gaze, and gesture.

The simplicity and severity with which Goya portrayed himself have predecessors dating back to the Renaissance, for example, Tintoretto's Self Portrait from around 1588, as well as in the 17th century – Rembrandt's Self-Portrait from 1655.

== Color and technique ==
The palette is dominated by dark colors, typical for this period of the painter's life. Contrasting with the blacks is the white of his shirt and complexion, with only a subtle crimson accent appearing on the lips. The dark background in shades of brown and ochre is not smooth like in other portraits. Above the ochre tones, there prevail sienna and terre verte. Single, swift brushstrokes, forming swirls of light and shadow, are clearly visible. They coil around the artist's head like fantastical creatures tormenting him in Goya's aquatint The Sleep of Reason Produces Monsters. Goya used heavy impasto to lighten the forehead and short brushstrokes to achieve various skin tones. The light falling on the face creates gentle shadows, resulting in a harmonious finish of the surface. The figure requires only a small amount of external light, creating a light, airy atmosphere typical of Velázquez's works. Working on texture and color, Goya employed a technique typical of Venetian painting, which emphasizes the softness of the skin and the exceptional luminosity of the face. The modeling of the face is a testament to Goya's peak skills, comparable to Rembrandt's style. In the case of the Prado version, the modeling is more delicate, the impasto lighter, perhaps because this painting was done on canvas rather than on a panel. Goya rarely used this support, but precisely during the post-war period, he used panels to paint the Portrait of the Duke of Wellington, a study of the head for the Portrait of the Duke of San Carlos, and a portrait of his grandson Mariano.

Similar color palette and psychological study can be found in the Portrait of José Luis Munárriz from the same year. In some respects, Goya's self-portrait is also akin to the portrait of Rita Luna, a retired theater actress. The woman appears downcast, her face expressing sadness and melancholy. Both paintings have almost the same size and direct, informal character. They depict aging artists, portraying a human vulnerability associated with age – a theme that Goya often explored in his works.

== Provenance ==
After Goya's death in 1828, his friend Antonio Brugada, at the request of the artist's son, prepared an inventory of the deceased's works. This document allowed for the later identification of many paintings, although the date of its preparation is not clear. (Note: Older sources indicate that Brugada returned from France to Spain already in the year of Goya's death in 1828 and cataloged his works at that time. In this case, the position in the inventory could correspond to the self-portrait from the academy. However, according to newer research by the Prado, this return occurred only in 1833, when the painting no longer belonged to Javier Goya, and the inventory was created in 1834.) Among the listed works are two of Goya's self-portraits in bust format. (Note: The second bust from inventory number 6 is identified in the Wilson and Gassier catalog, as well as by Xavier de Salas, as the earlier Self-Portrait (1783) from the collection of the Museum of Fine Arts in Agen.) The portrait in the Prado Museum is very likely the one recorded in the inventory under number 25 as "Portrait of Goya, signed 1815, bust". Both self-portraits were inherited by the painter's son, Javier.

Javier Goya arranged with the Real Academia de Bellas Artes de San Fernando that he would donate the self-portrait after the institution settled its outstanding debts to his father. In 1829, he received payment for the painting Ferdinand VII on Horseback, which the academy had commissioned in 1808, and he gifted the promised work to the academy on July 11 of the same year. The painting from the academy was selected for the illustrated collection of the most important works of the Real Academia de Bellas Artes de San Fernando (Cuadros selectos de la Real Academia de Bellas Artes de San Fernando), published between 1881 and 1885. José Galván created a drawing and an engraving based on the painting for this purpose.

After Javier's death, the version in the Prado Museum passed to Goya's grandson, Mariano. The division of the painter's estate was then handled by Federico Madrazo. Mariano, who gradually sold off his grandfather's property to cover his debts, sold it to Román Garreta y Huerto, Madrazo's brother-in-law. Later, the painting was acquired by Royal Decree on 5 April 1866, by the Museo de la Trinidad for four hundred escudos, along with the Portrait of Josefa Bayeu and the painting attributed to Goya, The Exorcism. This museum was merged with the Prado Museum, where the painting has been located since 1872.

== See also ==
- List of works by Francisco Goya

== Bibliography ==
- Fitz-Gérald, Xavier Desparmet (1928–1950). L'oeuvre peint de Goya. Vol. II. Paris: F. de Nobele. pp. 211, cat. 500.
- de Angelis, Rita (1974). L'opera pittorica completa di Goya. Milan: Rizzoli. pp. 129, cat. 585.
- Gassier, Pierre; Bareau, Juliet Wilson (1974). Vida y obra de Francisco Goya: reproducción de su obra completa, pinturas, dibujos y grabados. Barcelona: Juventud. pp. 297–298, cat. 1551, 1552. ISBN 8426156827.
- Lopera, José Alvarez; Glendinning, Nigel (2004). "Francisco de Goya. Autorretrato". El retrato español: del Greco a Picasso. Madrid: Museo Nacional del Prado. pp. 364, cat. 65. ISBN 978-84-1635-484-9.
- Francisco Goya. Wielka kolekcja sławnych malarzy. Vol. 11. Poznań: Oxford Educational. 2006. ISBN 83-7425-497-1.
- Peccatori, Stefano; Zuffi, Stefano (2006). Klasycy sztuki: Goya. Warsaw: Wydawnictwo "Arkady". p. 107. ISBN 83-60529-14-0. OCLC 749548628.
- Gambrelle, Fabienne (1998–2005). "Francisco Goya". Wielcy malarze, ich życie, inspiracje i dzieło. 77. Warsaw: Eaglemoss Polska: 6–7. ISSN 1505-9464.
- Swanston, Peter, ed. (2005). Francisco Goya. Vol. 25. Warsaw: De Agostini Polska. p. 3. ISBN 83-7398-185-3.
- Sánchez, Alfonso E. Pérez (2009). Goya. Warsaw: Oficyna Imbir. p. 147. ISBN 9788360334713.
- de Salas, Xavier (1978). Goya en Madrid. Madrid: Orgaz. pp. 95–96. ISBN 8485407121.
- Díaz, María Jesús, ed. (2010). Goya. Madrid: Susaeta Ediciones. p. 200. ISBN 978-84-9928-021-9.
- Sureda, Joan (2008). Los mundos de Goya. Madrid: Susaeta Ediciones. pp. 302–304. ISBN 978-84-9785-512-9.
- Tarabra, Daniela (2005). Muzea świata. Prado. Madryt. Warsaw: Świat Książki. p. 136. ISBN 8373915621.
- Aribau, Ferrán; Ruidera, Francesc; Altafuya, Lluís; Castillo, Roberto; Costaneda, Xavier (2006). Goya: su tiempo, su vida, su obra. Madrid: LIBSA. p. 366. ISBN 84-662-1405-4.
- Sánchez, Alfonso E. Pérez (1994). Muzeum Prado. Warsaw: Wydawnictwo "Arkady". p. 77. ISBN 8321337201.
- Díaz, María Jesús, ed. (2010). Goya. Madrid: Susaeta Ediciones. p. 200. ISBN 978-84-9928-021-9.
- Glendinning, Nigel; Segovia, Eduardo; Zaragoza, Teresa; Medina, Alicia García; Vega, Jesusa (2002). Goya 1900: catálogo ilustrado y estudio de la exposición en el Ministerio de Instrucción Pública y Bellas Artes. Vol. II. Madrid: Ministerio de Cultura. pp. 32, cat. 10. ISBN 8436935527.
