= Rafa Macarrón =

Spanish artist

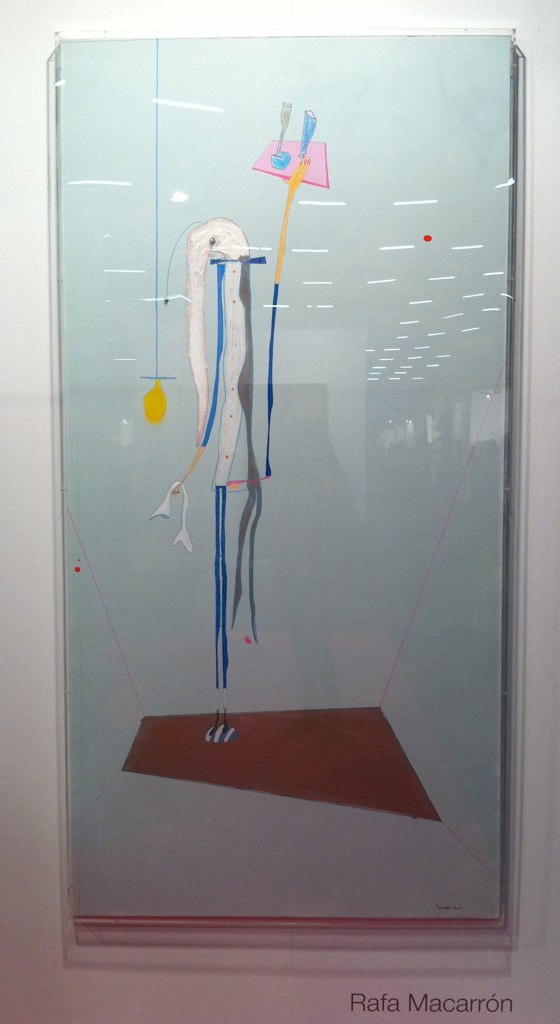
- A painting by Rafa Macarrón exhibited at Art Madrid 2011
- Born: Rafael Macarrón; January 1, 1981 (age 45); Madrid, Spain
- Movement: Expressionism
- Relatives: Ricardo Macarrón (great uncle)

Rafa Macarrón (born January 1, 1981) is a Spanish artist known for his paintings of idiosyncratic humanoid characters in bright colors and dream-like compositions. He is self-taught.

== Biography ==
Macarrón was born and raised in Madrid. He was exposed to global contemporary art at a young age, as his parents, both architects, took him on trips around the world to visit art fairs and museum exhibitions. Macarrón is the great-nephew of Spanish painter Ricardo Macarrón.

When he prepared to apply to college, Macarrón was dissuaded from applying to the Real Academia de Bellas Artes de San Fernando by Spanish artist Juan Barjola. Instead, he studied as a physiotherapist and competed as a road racing cyclist before turning his attention to painting professionally at age 25.

== Painting ==
Macarrón uses a wide range of materials in his works, including acrylic, gouache, and oil paints, pencils and markers, and aerosols, aluminum, and PVC. His influences include Roberto Matta, Jean Dubuffet, Alfonso Fraile, and Bonifacio Bembo, and is works have drawn comparisons with Joan Miró, Jean-Michel Basquiat, and Pablo Picasso.

== Awards ==
In 2011, he won the BMW Painting Award (sometimes dated as the 2010 Award) and in 2013 he was chosen as for a Best Artist award the Madrid art fair ARCO. He has exhibited at Art Madrid, Scope Basel, and Context Art Miami, with additional solo shows at CAC Málaga, La Fundacion La Nave Salinas, Allouche Gallery, Lio Malca Gallery, and SODA Istanbul, among others.
