= La Tirana (Goya, 1794) =

1794 painting by Francisco de Goya

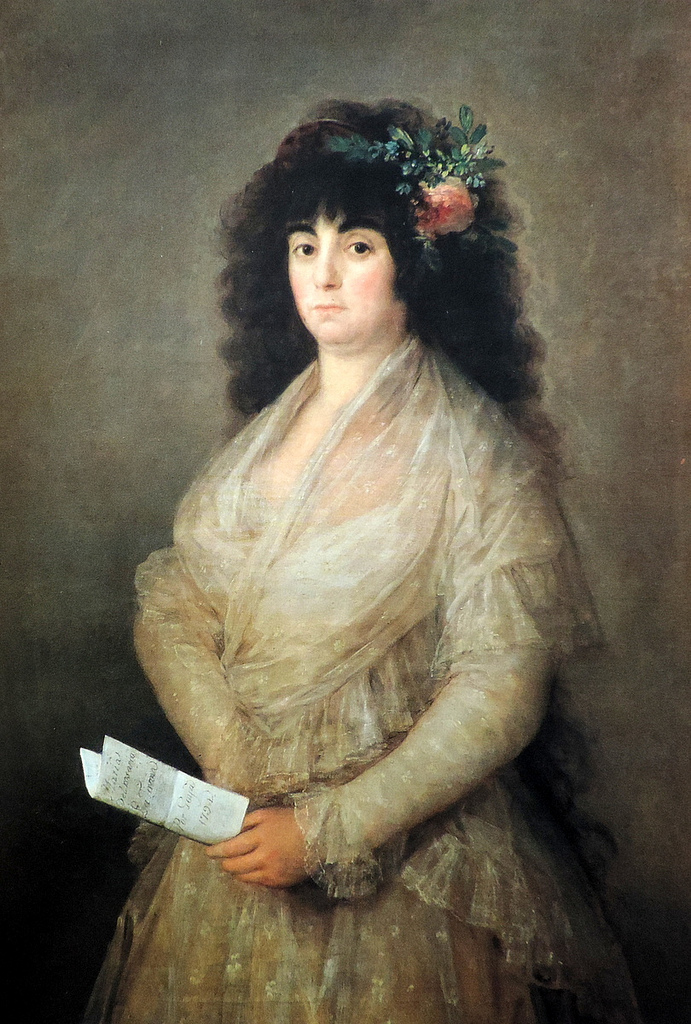
- Artist: Francisco de Goya
- Year: 1794
- Medium: Oil painting
- Dimensions: 112 cm × 79 cm (44 in × 31 in)
- Location: Real Academia de Bellas Artes de San Fernando, Madrid

La Tirana is a 1794 oil on canvas portrait by Francisco de Goya. It was last recorded in the March collection in Palma de Mallorca in 2001.

It is the second of two portraits he produced of the actress María del Rosario Fernández, known as 'La Tirana' after her actor husband Francisco Castellanos, who was nicknamed el Tirano. The other is in the Real Academia de Bellas Artes de San Fernando.

== See also ==
- List of works by Francisco Goya

== Bibliography (in Spanish) ==
- Glendinning, Nigel (1992). Central Hispano, ed. Goya. La década de los Caprichos. pp. 148–149. ISBN 84-87181-10-4.
- Gómez García, Manuel (1998). Diccionario Akal de Teatro. Ediciones Akal. ISBN 9788446008279.
- Huerta, Javier; Peral, Emilio; Urzaiz, Héctor (2005). Espasa-Calpe, ed. Teatro español de la A a la Z. Madrid. ISBN 9788467019698.
