= La Tirana (Goya, 1792) =

Painting by Francisco de Goya

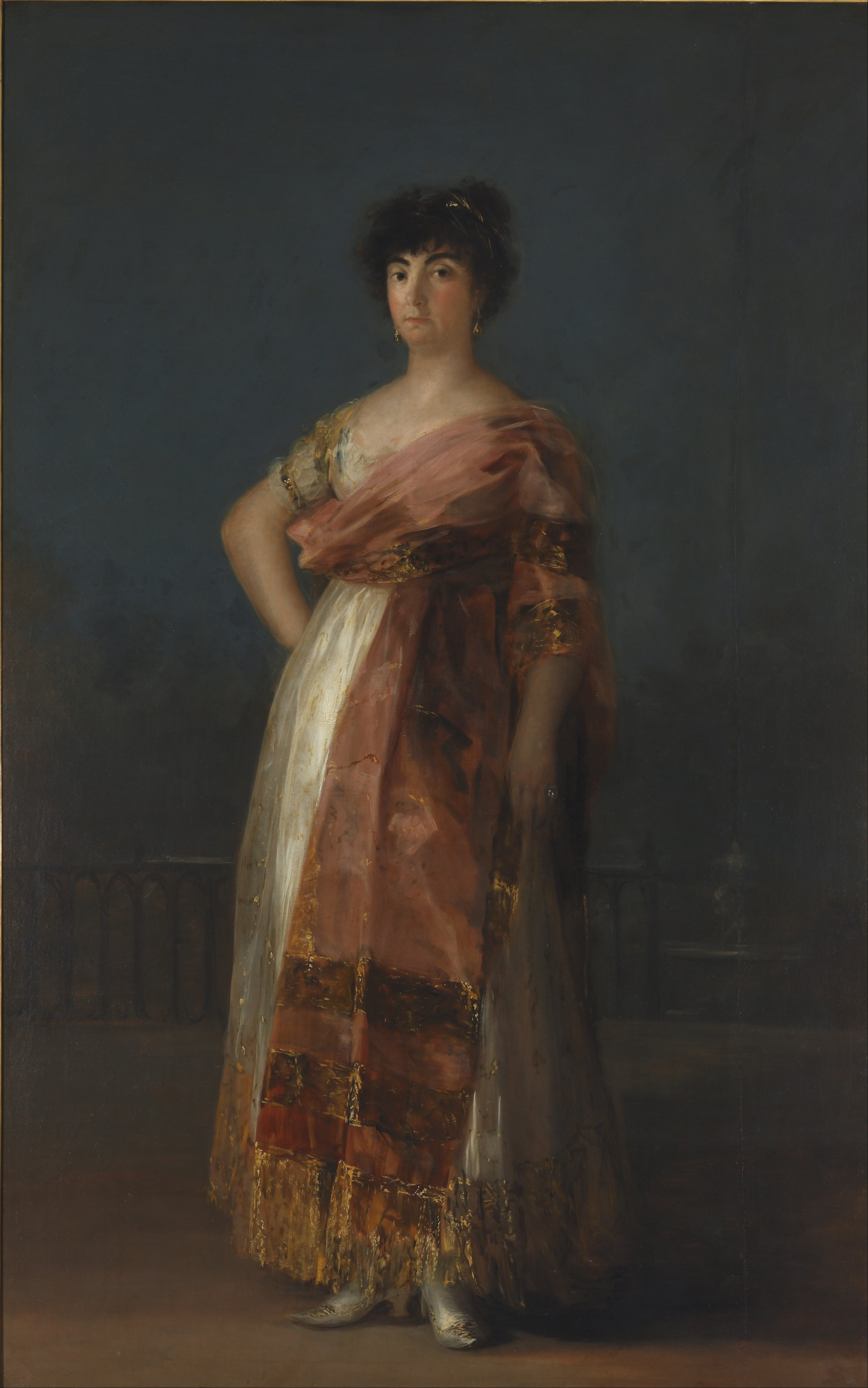
- Artist: Francisco Goya
- Year: 1790–1792
- Medium: oil on canvas
- Dimensions: 206 cm × 130 cm (81 in × 51 in)
- Location: Real Academia de Bellas Artes de San Fernando, Madrid

La Tirana is an oil on canvas portrait by Francisco de Goya. Previously dated to 1799 due to a later pencil inscription, it is now dated to 1790–1792 by the Goya scholars José Gudiol and José Manuel Pita Andrade. It is now in the Real Academia de Bellas Artes de San Fernando in Madrid.

It is the first of two portraits he produced of the actress María del Rosario Fernández, known as 'La Tirana' after her actor husband Francisco Castellanos, who was nicknamed el Tirano. The other is in a private collection.

== See also ==
- List of works by Francisco Goya

== Bibliography (in Spanish) ==
- Glendinning, Nigel (1992). Central Hispano, ed. Goya. La década de los Caprichos. pp. 148–149. ISBN 84-87181-10-4.
- Gómez García, Manuel (1998). Diccionario Akal de Teatro. Ediciones Akal. ISBN 9788446008279.
- Huerta, Javier; Peral, Emilio; Urzaiz, Héctor (2005). Espasa-Calpe. Teatro español de la A a la Z. Madrid. ISBN 9788467019698.
