= The Assumption of Mary Magdalene =

Painting by Jusepe de Ribera

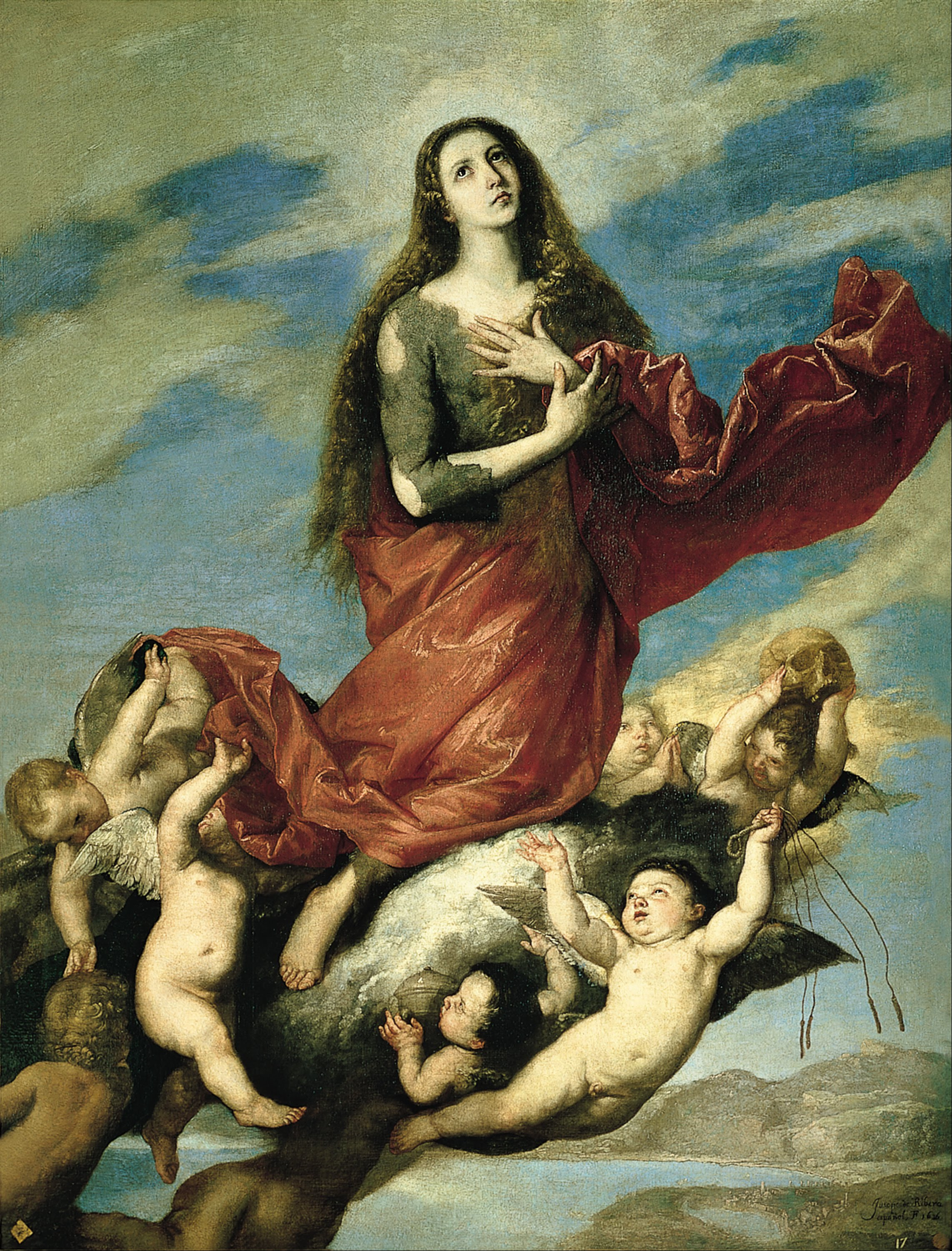

The Assumption of Mary Magdalene is a 1636 oil on canvas painting by Jusepe de Ribera. It is now in the Museo de la Real Academia de Bellas Artes de San Fernando in Madrid, in whose inventories it has appeared since 1818, suggesting it was transferred there during Ferdinand VII's reign from the collection assembled by Joseph Bonaparte for the unrealised National Museum. It measures 231 cm by 173 cm. In the background is a bay, possibly meant to be that of Naples or Marseille from Mary Magdalene's life story in The Golden Legend.

It is marked by the artist's continuing contact with the Spanish style despite being in Naples. It was probably commissioned by one of his patrons, Manuel de Acevedo y Zúñiga. It was formerly in the El Escorial, appearing in its 1700 inventory as a "Magdalene with a gilded frame, three and a quarter varas long" and valued at 1,000 ducats.
