= Alicia Iturrioz =

Spanish portraitist and painter (1927–2021)

- Born: 31 January 1927; Eibar, Gipuzkoa, Spain
- Died: 9 September 2021 (aged 94); San Sebastián, Spain
- Education: Real Academia de Bellas Artes de San Fernando
- Occupations: painter, author
- Spouse: Ricardo Macarrón
- Children: 2

Alicia Iturrioz Arrizabalaga (31 January 1927 – 9 September 2021) was a Spanish painter and author. She is known for her portraits, she was a portraitist for the Spanish royal family and the European aristocracy.

== Biography ==
Alicia Iturrioz Arrizabalaga was born 31 January 1927 in Eibar in Gipuzkoa, Spain. She was talented at making art as a child, and she went on to attend the Madrid Academy of Art at the Real Academia de Bellas Artes de San Fernando in 1944.

She met her future husband in college, Ricardo Macarrón. Together they had two daughters, and she stopped painting for 20 years to raise her children. Iturrioz published a memoir after her husband died, Mi Vida con Ricardo Macarrón (2014), which recounted the couple's experiences.

When she returned to painting after raising children she continued with portraits, but added landscape and still life painting. Iturrioz died on 9 September 2021 in San Sebastián, Basque Autonomous Community, Spain.

Her work is found in public museum collections including the Thyssen-Bornemisza Museum, and the Museo Cristóbal Balenciaga. Queen Elizabeth II of England had one of her paintings of her corgi dog in her collection.
