= Ricardo Macarrón =

Spanish painter (1926–2004)

- Born: Ricardo Macarrón Jaime; 9 April 1926; Madrid, Spain
- Died: 14 May 2004 (aged 78); Riaza, Spain
- Resting place: Almudena cemetery, Madrid, Spain
- Education: Real Academia de Bellas Artes de San Fernando
- Occupations: artist, painter, portraitist
- Spouse: Alicia Iturrioz
- Children: 2
- Relatives: Rafa Macarrón (great nephew)

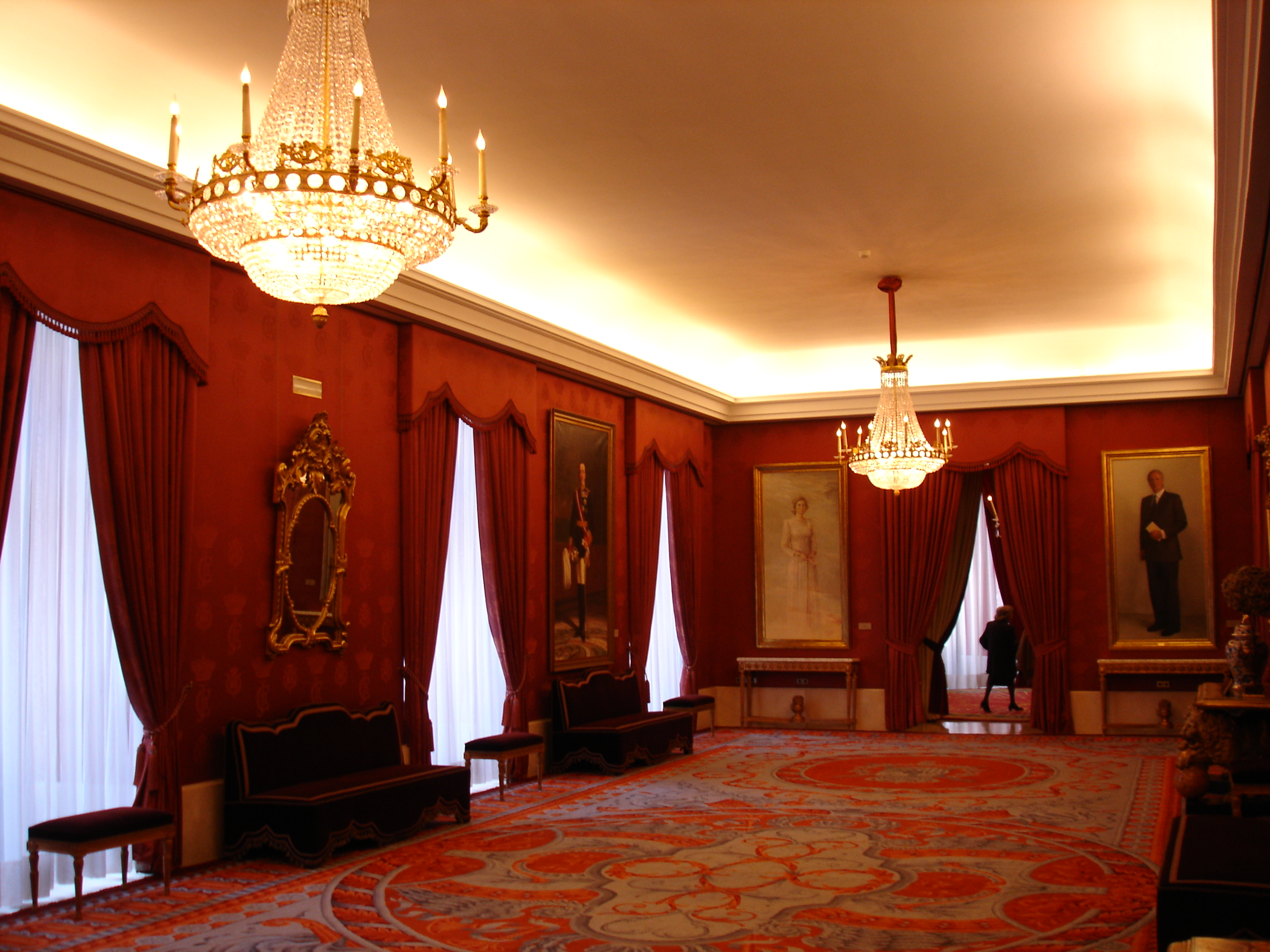
Teatro Real de Madrid (2005), featuring portraits by Ricardo Macarrón of Don Juan Carlos de Borbón and Queen Doña Sofía

Ricardo Macarrón Jaime (1926–2004), was a Spanish painter and portraitist. He is known for his court paintings for European royalty and portraits of aristocracy, including four generations of the House of Bourbon, and Victoria Eugenia of Battenberg.

== Early life ==
Ricardo Macarrón Jaime was born on 9 April 1926 in Madrid, Spain. His father Juan Macarrón Despierto owned a workshop for art restorers and carvers.

Macarrón attended Real Academia de Bellas Artes de San Fernando, studying under Joaquín Valverde Lasarte. While he was a student he made his first portrait of artist Joaquín García Donaire in 1943. Macarrón won many art awards while he was a student. He met his future wife Alicia Iturrioz in college, where she also attended too. Together they had two daughters.

== Career and late life ==
He had three marked periods of style in his paintings – from 1955 to 1960 he was working with a cubist influence; from 1960 to 1968 his work was darker and emphasized "disenchantment"; and in later life in the 1990s the work reflected his strong technical skills and techniques. Macarrón had painted portraits of three Queens, Sofia of Spain, Elizabeth II of England, Noor of Jordan. Also notable is his 1961 portrait of Carmen Cervera.

Macarrón died on 14 May 2004 in Riaza, Spain. He was cremated and has a memorial in Almudena cemetery in Madrid. After Macarróns death, Iturrioz wrote the memoir Mi Vida con Ricardo Macarrón (2014) about their shared life experiences.

His work is found in public museum collections, including the Thyssen-Bornemisza Museum, and Biblioteca Museu Víctor Balaguer.
