= Self-Portrait with Dr Arrieta =

Painting by Francisco de Goya

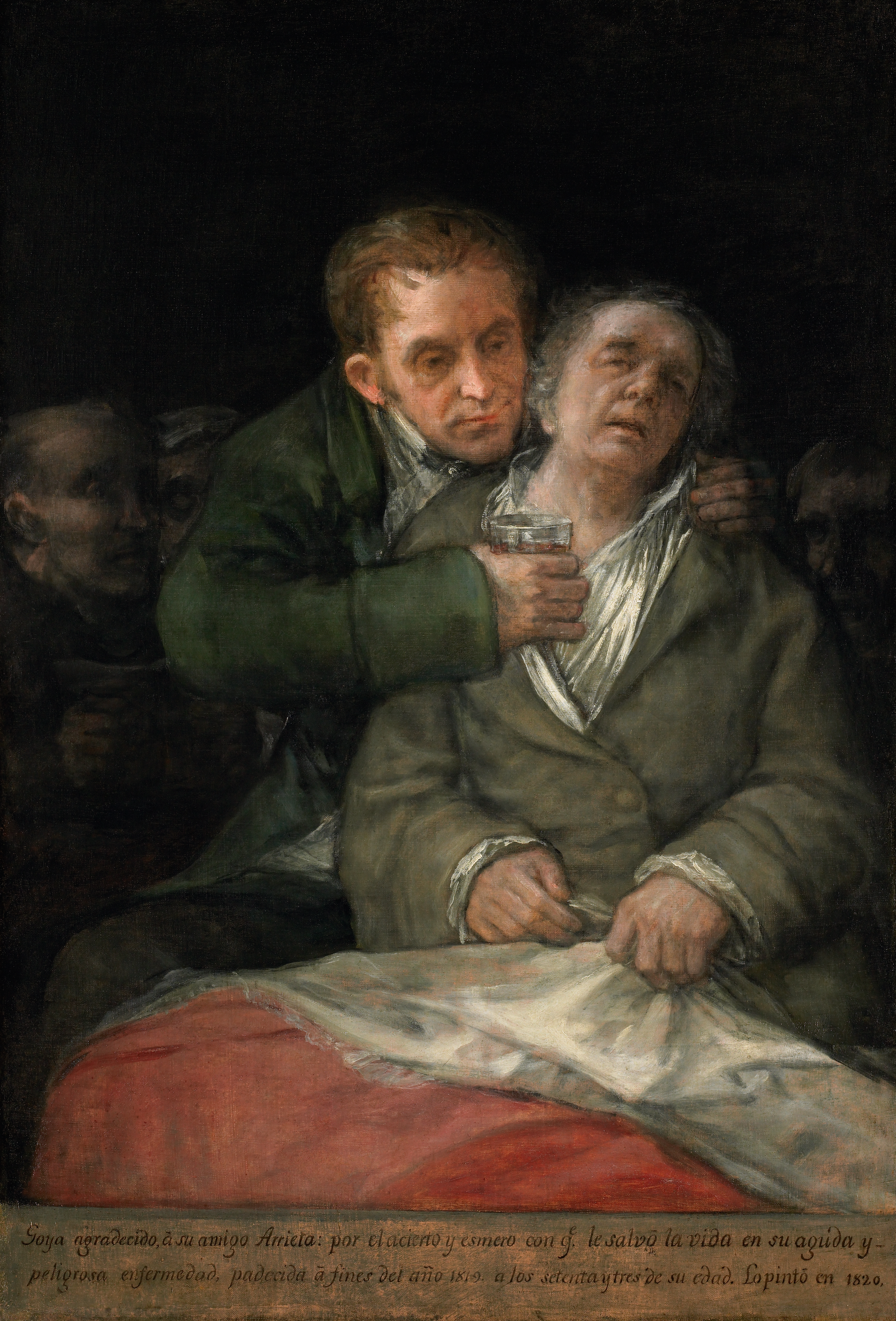
- Artist: Francisco de Goya
- Year: 1820
- Medium: Oil on canvas
- Dimensions: 114.62 cm × 76.52 cm (45.13 in × 30.13 in)
- Location: Minneapolis Institute of Art, Minneapolis

Self-Portrait with Dr Arrieta is the English title given to a painting by Spanish artist Francisco Goya. The work is an oil on canvas, painted in 1820, and is currently held in the Minneapolis Institute of Art, Minnesota. Many scholars have seen religious themes in the work. Other interpretations compare and contrast the painting with Goya's series of Black Paintings, contextualizing the work within his career at large.

== Background ==
In 1792, Goya developed a sudden, serious illness which included dizziness, weakness, delirium, sickness, abdominal pain, deafness, and partial blindness. By the time he returned to Madrid, in 1793, Goya was completely deaf. Various diagnoses of this illness have been offered: syphilis, lead poisoning, cerebrovascular disease, acute infection of the central nervous system, and the rare condition of Vogt-Koyanagi-Harada syndrome—temporary inflammation of the uveal tract associated with permanent deafness.

In 1819 Goya had a second serious illness. Little information is available on the nature of the illness or the treatment provided by Eugenio García Arrieta beyond the painting Self-Portrait with Dr. Arrieta. An inscription below the figures explains why Goya made the picture:

Goya, in gratitude to his friend Arrieta: for the compassion and care with which he saved his life during the acute and dangerous illness he suffered towards the end of the year 1819 in his seventy-third year. He painted it in 1820.

Goya may have expected to die, but under Arrieta's care, he was nursed back to health and lived another eight years. Thus, the work was a present for Arrieta, painted in gratitude for the gift of life. However, it is uncertain how long the painting remained in Arrieta's possession. In 1820 the doctor traveled to Africa to study bubonic plague, and it is probable that the painting remained in Spain. By 1860, when exhibited in Madrid, it was in the collection of Mr Martinez of Madrid. Later the painting was recorded in various private collections in Paris before being acquired by the Minneapolis Institute of Art.

== Compositional analysis ==
In the painting, Goya is seated on his bed and is obviously weak from his illness. He grasps his bed-sheet as if clinging onto life and is supported from behind by the arm of Arrieta. The doctor gently encourages his patient to take medicine. Shadowy figures in the background seem to be faces of doom.

The entire portrait is composed of contrasts. In the foreground, Dr. Arrieta and Goya are depicted naturalistically in a dim light, with the red bed-sheet at the bottom of the painting bringing warmth to the setting. This warmth is juxtaposed against the darker, phosphorescent tones used to depict the shadow-like figures appearing in the background. Further, Arrieta's gaze demonstrates focus and determination, with the tone of red in his complexion suggesting his good health, whereas Goya's closed eyes signify a lack of awareness and an inability to support himself, and the grayer tones used in Goya's face make him appear sick and sullen. The weakness of Goya is emphasized by his hands that clutch the bed linens and his head that slopes backwards – a posture set in contrast with Arrieta who stands upright and firmly supports his patient while holding the glass to his lips. The dress of each of the figures amplifies their differences, as Goya wears a gray robe while Arrieta a coat of green – a color observed to be associated with hope.

== Interpretations ==
=== Religious themes in secular context ===
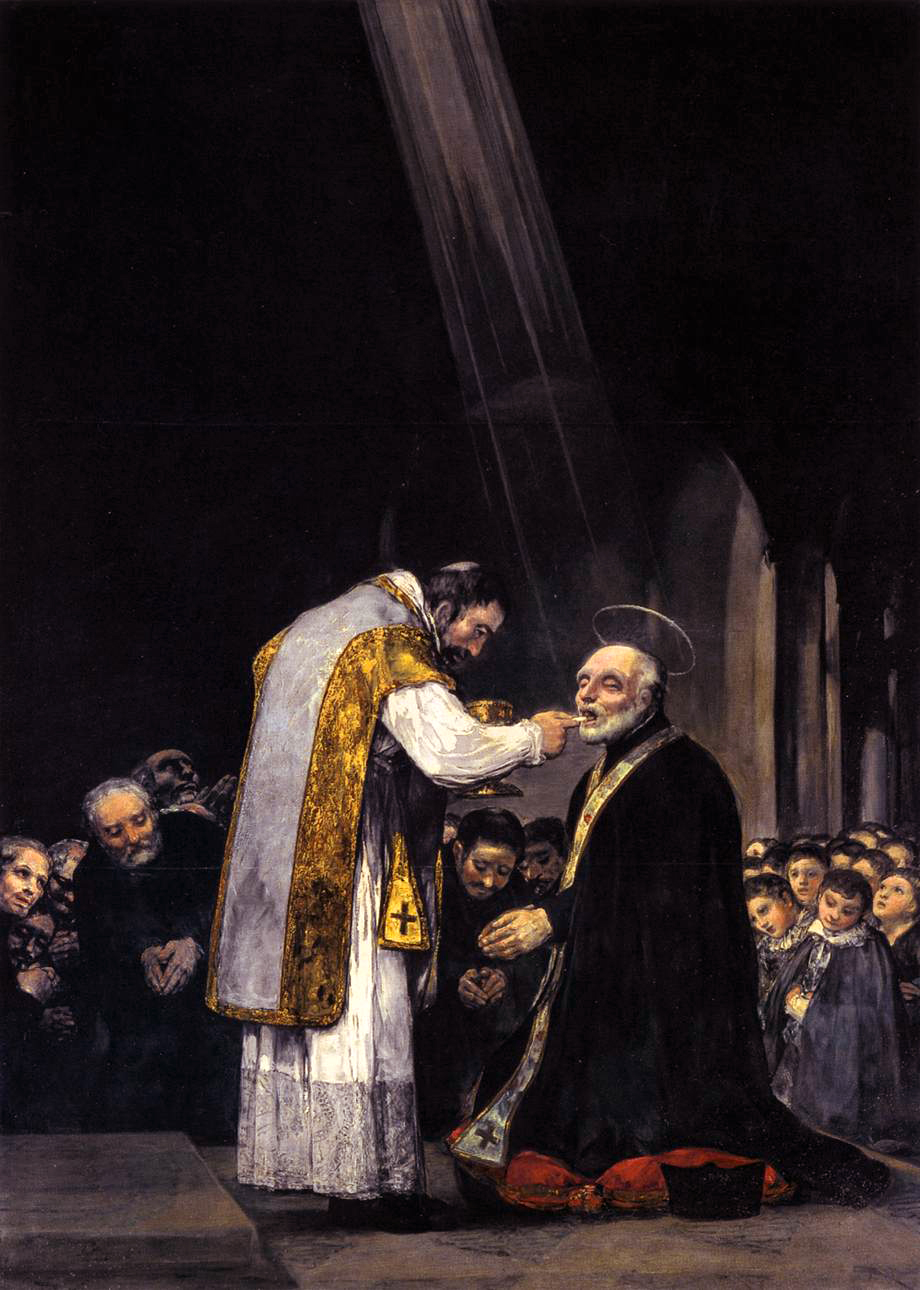
Goya's The Last Communion of San Jose de Calasanz (1819)

The inscription found attached to Self-Portrait with Dr. Arrieta leads many scholars to liken the work to ex-votos typically found in churches during the period, depicting religious scenes as a demonstration of gratitude for divine intervention. What makes Goya's work distinct from these votive offerings is the secular context in which he places the scene. The painting directs its gratitude towards the physician rather than towards the church, and attributes his recovery to works of science rather than works of divinity. Brown and Galassi suggest that the framing of the portrait in such a way may have been done with the intention of portraying Dr. Arrieta as a saintly figure for his assistance in Goya's escape from death.

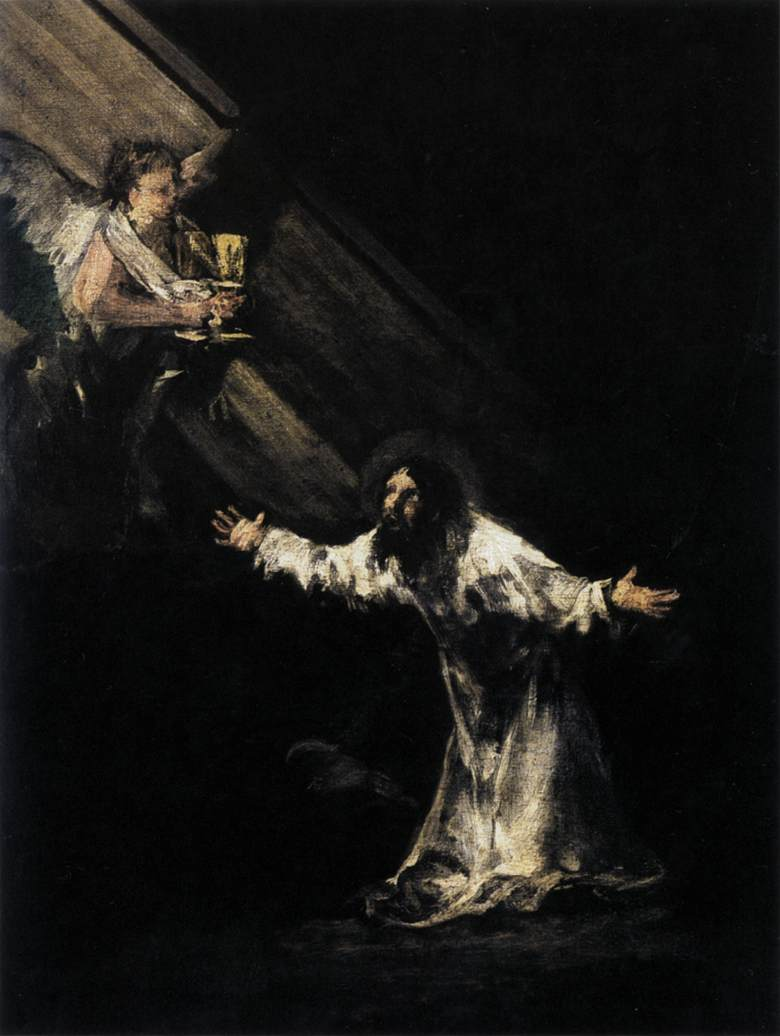
Goya's Agony in the Garden (1819) depicting Christ with the cup-bearing angel at Gethsemane

Other references to Christianity have also been observed by scholars, such as the portrait's apparent theme of communion, which was often found to be presented in a secular context amongst Spanish artists at the time. This theme is read through Arrieta's action of raising the cup to Goya's lips, reminiscent of the sacramental Blood of Christ offered at Christian communion ceremonies. Additionally, the theme of Gethsemane, where Christ appears with the cup-bearing angel, is also observed. In the year prior to his painting of Self-Portrait with Dr. Arrieta, Goya completed The Last Communion of San Jose de Calasanz (see right) and Agony in the Garden (see left), each of which deal with these exact religious themes.

Other links have been made between the portrait and traditional religious images such as the Pieta and religious ideas like Ars moriendi. Across the different religious allusions, scholars agree that the themes are all presented in a distinctly secular way within the portrait.

=== Background figures & Goya's "Black Paintings" ===
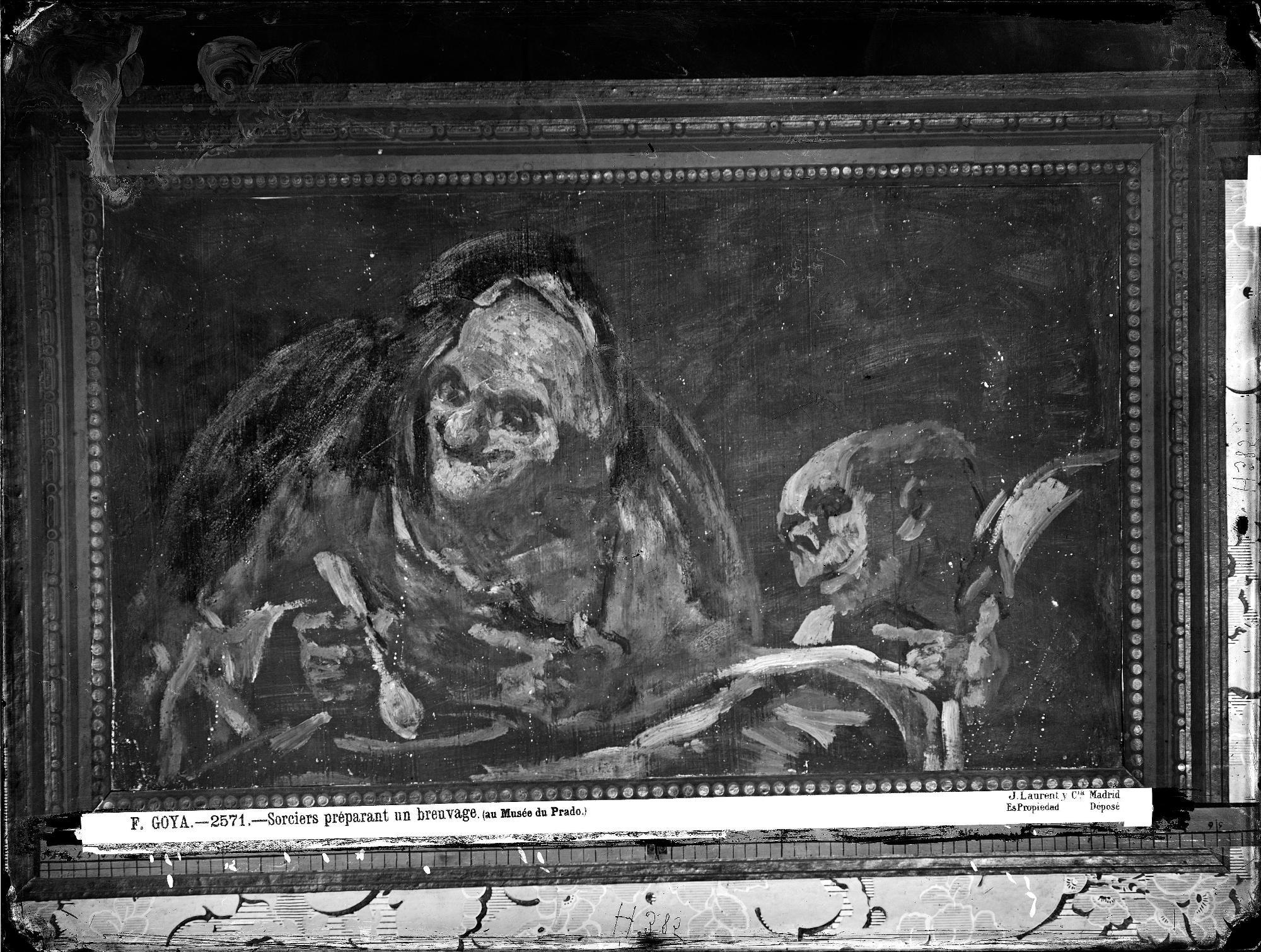
An example of one of Goya's "Black Paintings": Dos viejos comiendo sopa (1823). The shadow-like figures seen in the background of Self-Portrait of Dr. Arrieta are likened to those found in these paintings.

Some interpretations of Self-Portrait suggest that the figures appearing in the background are meant to be seen as humans, reading the figure on the left side of the painting as a woman offering help, and the figure on the right as a neighbor displaying concern for the patient; others view the left-most figure as a priest preparing to practice common deathbed rituals of Christianity. Yet there is also a collection of scholars who see these dark and shadow-like figures as signifying a connection between Self-Portrait with Dr. Arrieta and Goya's later collection of Black Paintings. This interpretation likens the figures in the background of Self-Portrait to the feverish visions depicted in the Black Paintings – visions which are thought to have resulted from the artist's illnesses. In this line of thought, Self-Portrait is viewed as a window into Goya's experiences with illness, as the painting explicitly deals with that very subject.

However, there is no clear consensus; Baldwin, for one, raises instead the idea that, rather than being seen as similar, Self-Portrait stands in contrast with the Black Paintings. While the Black Paintings explicitly deal with themes of violence and conflict in the public sphere, the scene in Self-Portrait shows men caring and healing one another within the private sphere. In this way, rather than being pessimistic or nightmarish, Self-Portrait with Dr Arrieta is viewed as a painting about hope.

== Significance ==
Goya's Self-Portrait with Dr. Arrieta has been described as an emblem of a shift in Spanish portraiture towards both the Modern Period and the secularization of portraits. Further, the painting is also demonstrative of a shift within Goya's own portraiture, particularly in his depiction of himself before and after his encounters with illness. In a drawing completed by Goya sometime before 1792 – prior to his first encounter with death – the artist's use of defined lines and distinct shadows depict him in a youthful, lively manner. This representation is markedly different from the way Goya represents himself in Self-Portrait, with a hanging jaw and weakened body. Thus, the portrait, especially when seen in relation to earlier works, aids in analyzing and tracking this shift in Goya's art.

Additionally, Self-Portrait with Dr. Arrieta can be situated within the context of themes carried throughout Goya's artistic career. As Baldwin observes, there exists a continuous interaction between contrasting ideas of pessimism and hope, forgetting and relearning, destruction and salvation across many of Goya's works. Self-Portrait is significant within this context as it presents a scene of weakness and death, yet simultaneously provides hope and the anticipation of healing.

== See also ==
- Self-portraiture
- List of works by Francisco Goya

== Sources ==
- www.ncbi.nlm.nih.gov – The fine art of patient-doctor relationships
- John J. Ciofalo. "The Artist in the Vicinity of Death." The Self-Portraits of Francisco Goya (Cambridge: Cambridge University Press, 2001)
