= María del Rosario Fernández =

Spanish actress

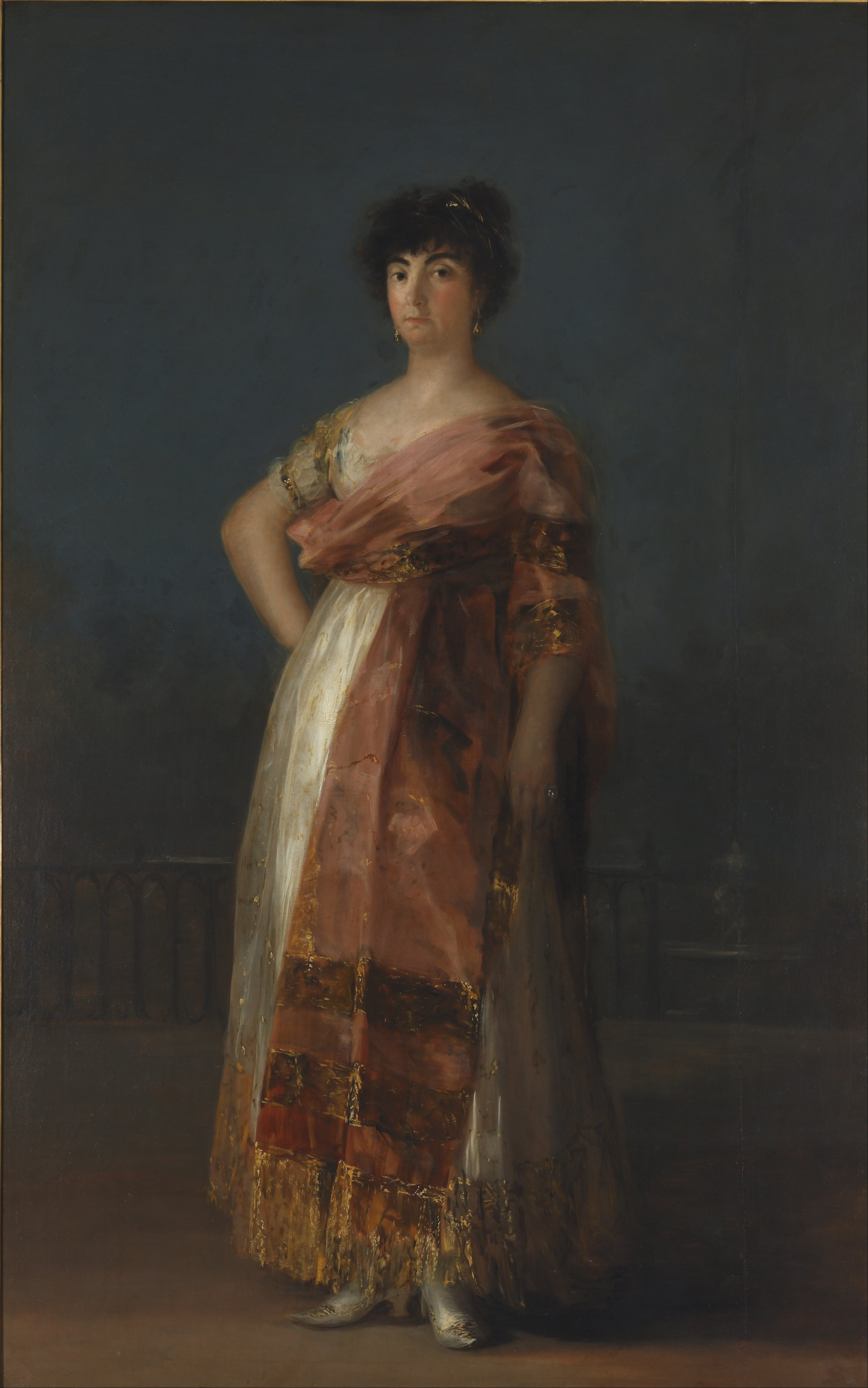
María del Rosario Fernández by Francisco de Goya y Lucientes.

María del Rosario Fernández (1755–1803), was a Spanish stage actress. She is regarded as one of the most notable actresses of Spain during her period, and was known as La Tirana.
