= Antonio Brugada =

Spanish painter (1804–1863)

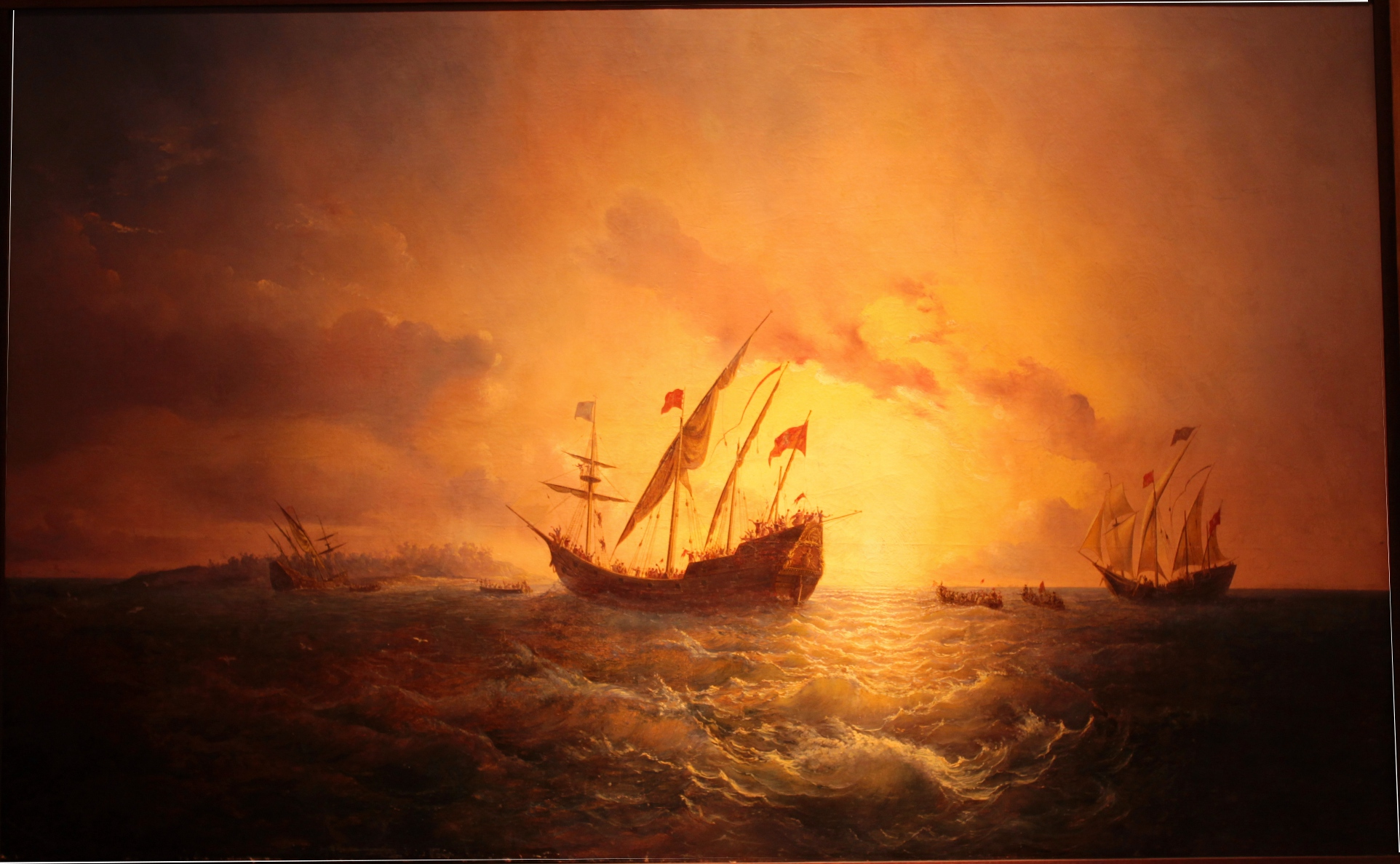
Alba de America

Antonio Brugada (1804 – 1863) was a Spanish painter. Brugada is best known for his dramatic seascapes.

He studied in the School of Fine Arts of San Fernando de Madrid between 1818 and 1821. Between 1820 and 1823 he was part of the National Military of Madrid. He sought asylum in France in 1823, and he established himself in Bordeaux, where he met Francisco Goya. Brugada was instrumental in cataloging and identifying some of the mythological figures in Goya's c. 1823 Black Paintings series.
