= Royal Academy of Fine Arts of San Fernando =

Art school, museum and gallery in Madrid, Spain

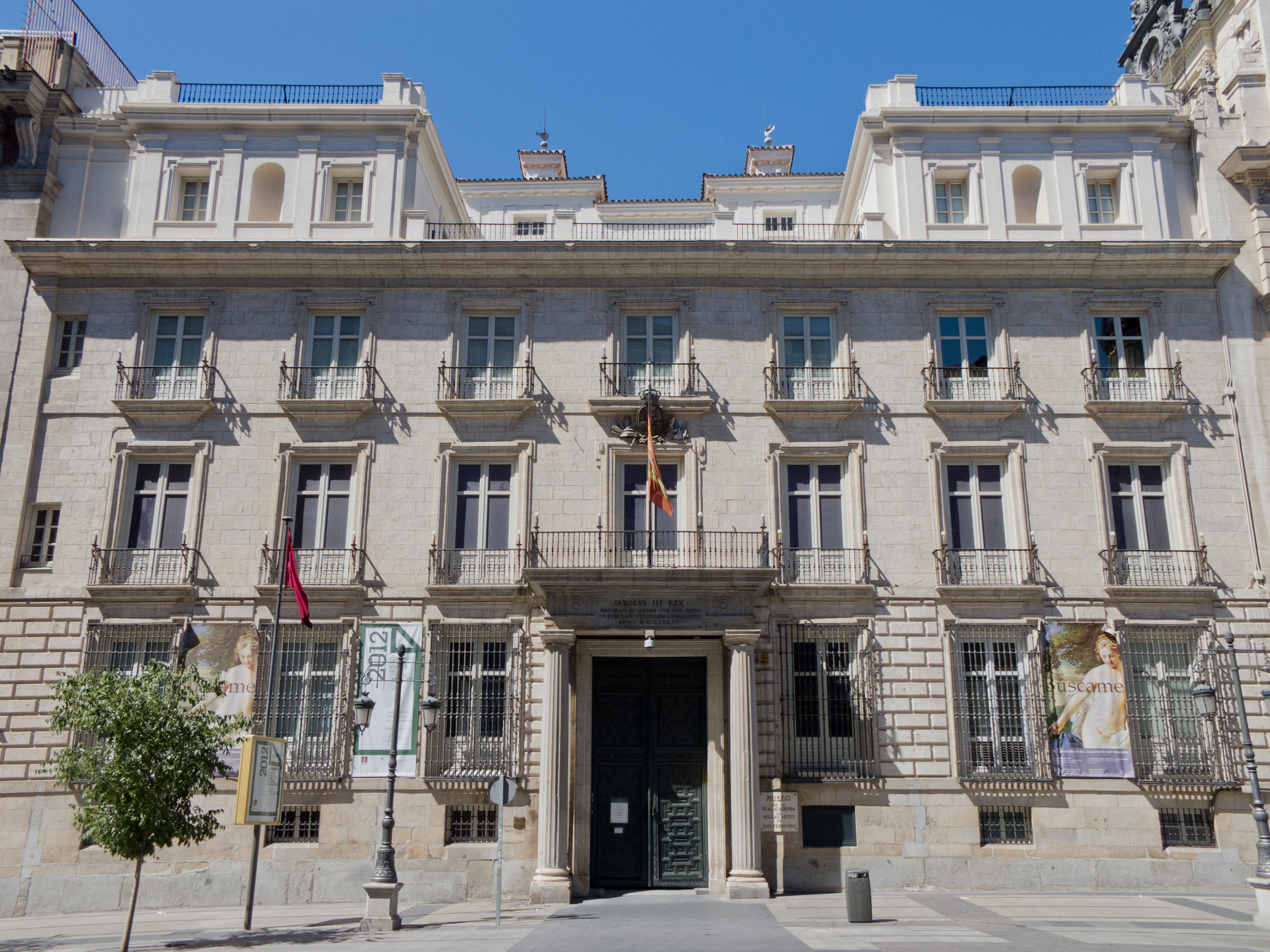
- Palacio de Goyeneche
- Abbreviation: RABASF
- Formation: 1752; 274 years ago
- Type: Learned society, fine arts academy, art museum
- Legal status: public law corporation
- Headquarters: Palacio de Goyeneche
- Location: Calle de Alcalá 13, Madrid, Spain
- Coordinates: 40°25′04″N 3°42′03″W
- Affiliations: Instituto de España

The Real Academia de Bellas Artes de San Fernando (RABASF; transl. Royal Academy of Fine Arts of San Fernando), located on the Calle de Alcalá in the centre of Madrid, currently functions as a museum and gallery. A public law corporation, it is integrated together with other Spanish royal academies in the Instituto de España.

== History ==
The academy was established by royal decree in 1752. About twenty years later, the enlightened monarch Charles III purchased a palace in Madrid as the academy's new home. The building had been designed by José Benito de Churriguera for the Goyeneche family. The king commissioned Diego de Villanueva to convert the building for academic use, employing a neoclassical style in place of Churriguera's baroque design.

The academy is also the headquarters of the Madrid Academy of Art.

== Notable alumni ==
The first graduate of the academy was Bárbara María Hueva. Francisco Goya was once one of the academy's directors. Its alumni include Felip Pedrell, Pablo Picasso, Kiko Argüello, Remedios Varo, Salvador Dalí, Margarita Manso, Antonio López García, Juan Luna, Fernando Amorsolo, Oscar de la Renta, Francesc Daniel Molina i Casamajó, Ricardo Macarrón, Alicia Iturrioz, Fernando Botero, and Melecio Figueroa.

== Notable academics ==
- Mariana de Silva-Bazán y Sarmiento (1739-1784), aristocratic figure, writer, painter, translator
- Juan Luis Vassallo, sculptor.

== Collection ==
Doubling as a museum and gallery, today it houses a fine art collection of paintings from the 15th to 20th centuries: Hans Müelich, Arcimboldo, Giovanni Bellini, Juan de Juanes, Antonio Allegri da Correggio, Luis de Morales, Martin de Vos, Marinus van Reymerswaele, Otto Van Veen, Leandro Bassano, il Cavaliere d'Arpino, Guido Reni, Rubens, Domenichino, Jan Janssens, Giovanni Battista Beinaschi, Bartolomeo Cavarozzi, Daniel Seghers, José de Ribera, Andrea Vaccaro, Jacob Jordaens, Pieter Boel, Claudio Coello, Juan Van der Hamen y León, Van Dyck, Pieter Claesz, Antonio de Pereda, Diego Velázquez, Margherita Caffi, Carreño de Miranda, Paul de Vos, Alonso Cano, Zurbarán, Murillo, Francesco Battaglioli, Jean Ranc, Jacopo Amigoni, Agostino Masucci, Fragonard, Corrado Giaquinto, Domenico Tiepolo, Alessandro Magnasco, Pompeo Battoni, Antonio Joli, Luis Paret y Alcázar, Mengs, Goya, Giuseppe Pirovani (one rare Portrait of George Washington), Joaquín Sorolla, Ignacio Zuloaga, Juan Gris, Pablo Serrano, Fernando Zobel, Lorenzo Quiros, among others.

== Gallery ==
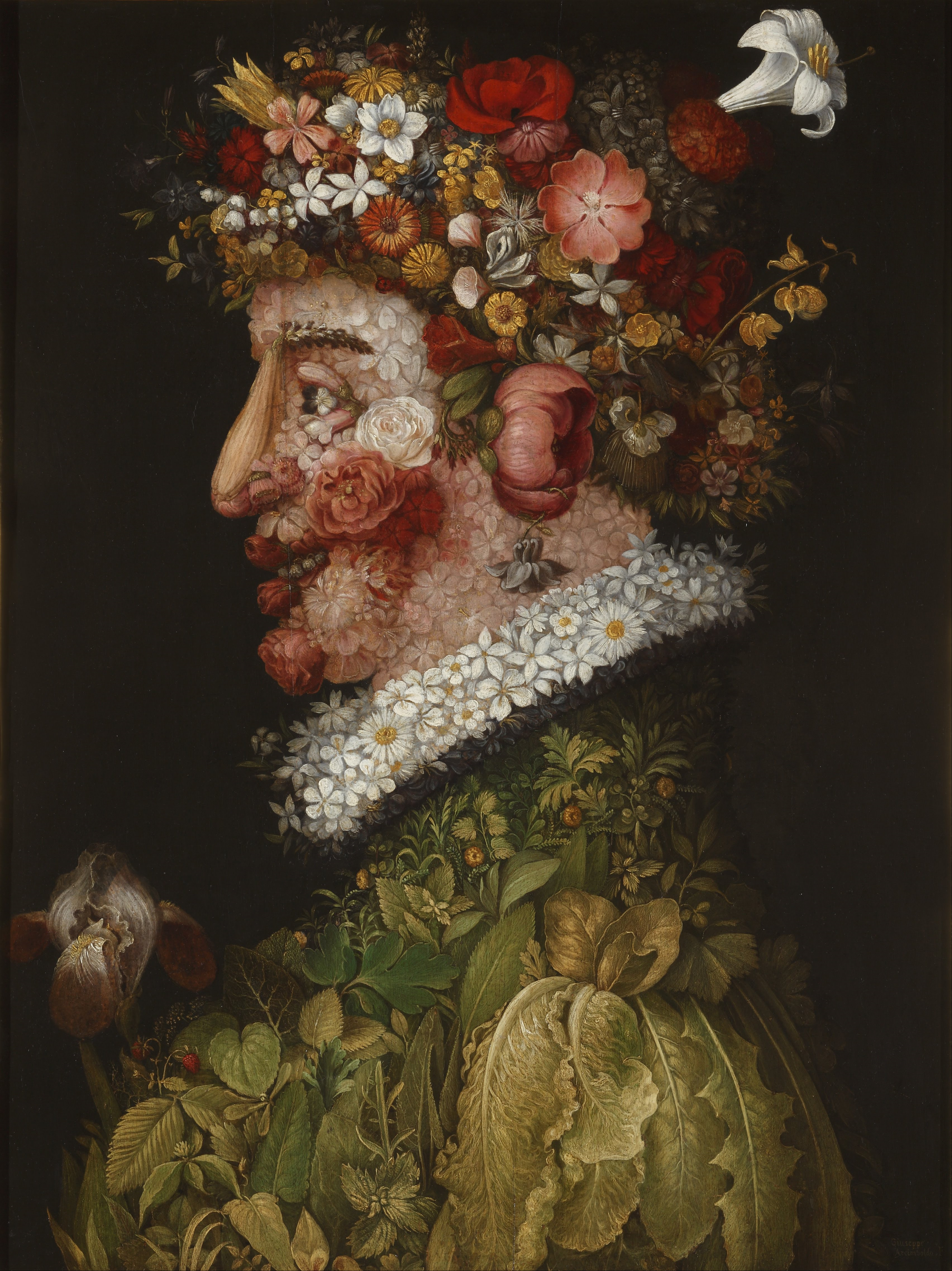
Spring, Giuseppe Arcimboldo (1563)

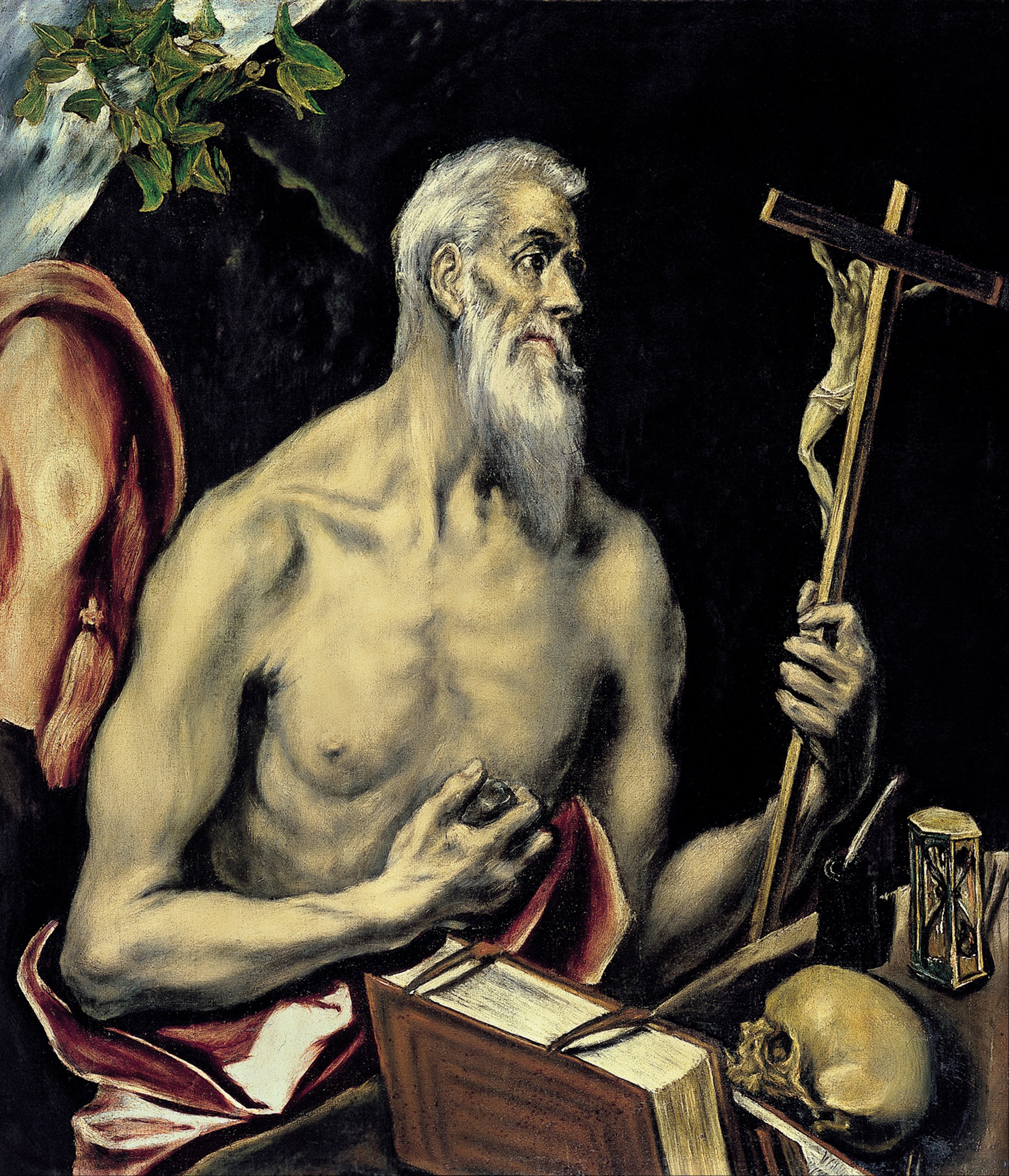
Saint Jerome, El Greco (c. 1605–1610)

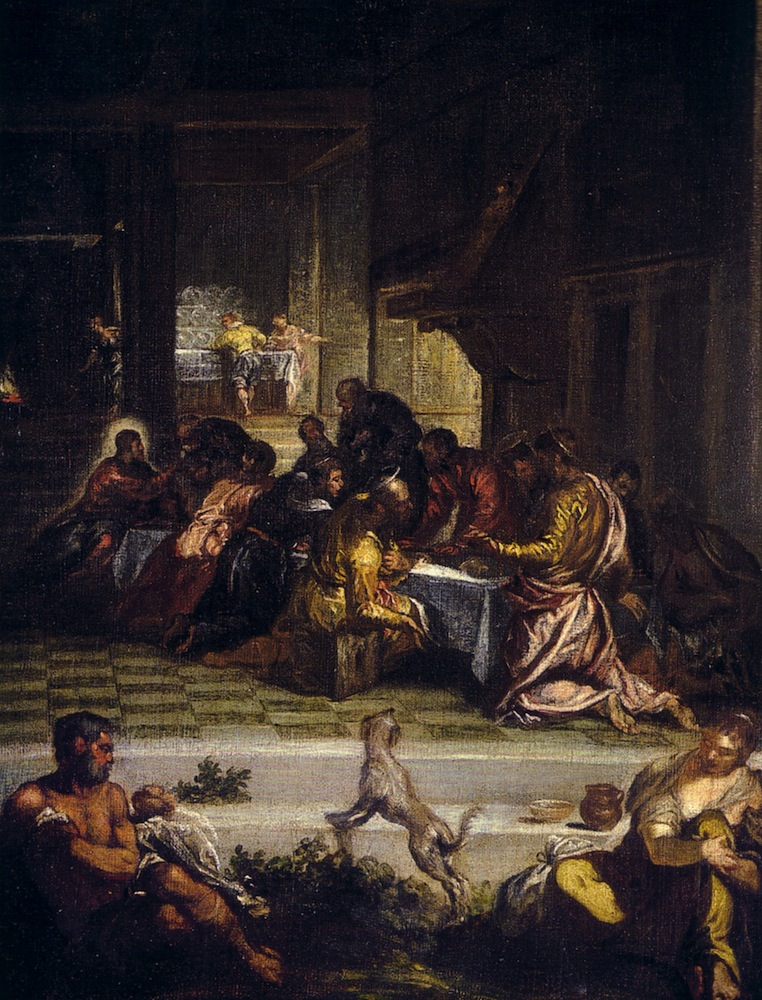
The Last Supper, copy of Tintoretto by Diego Velázquez (1629?)

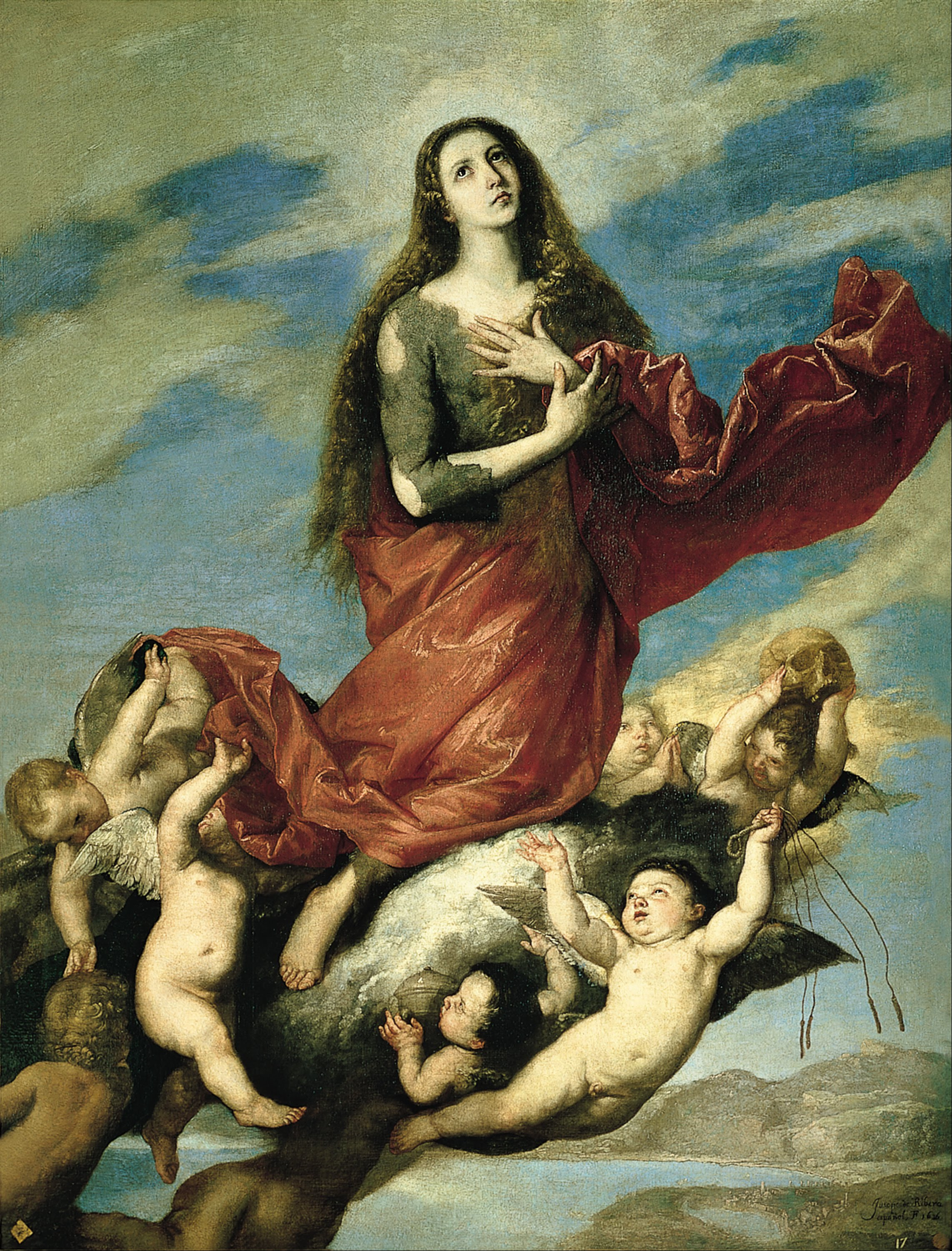
The Assumption of Mary Magdalene, José de Ribera (1636)

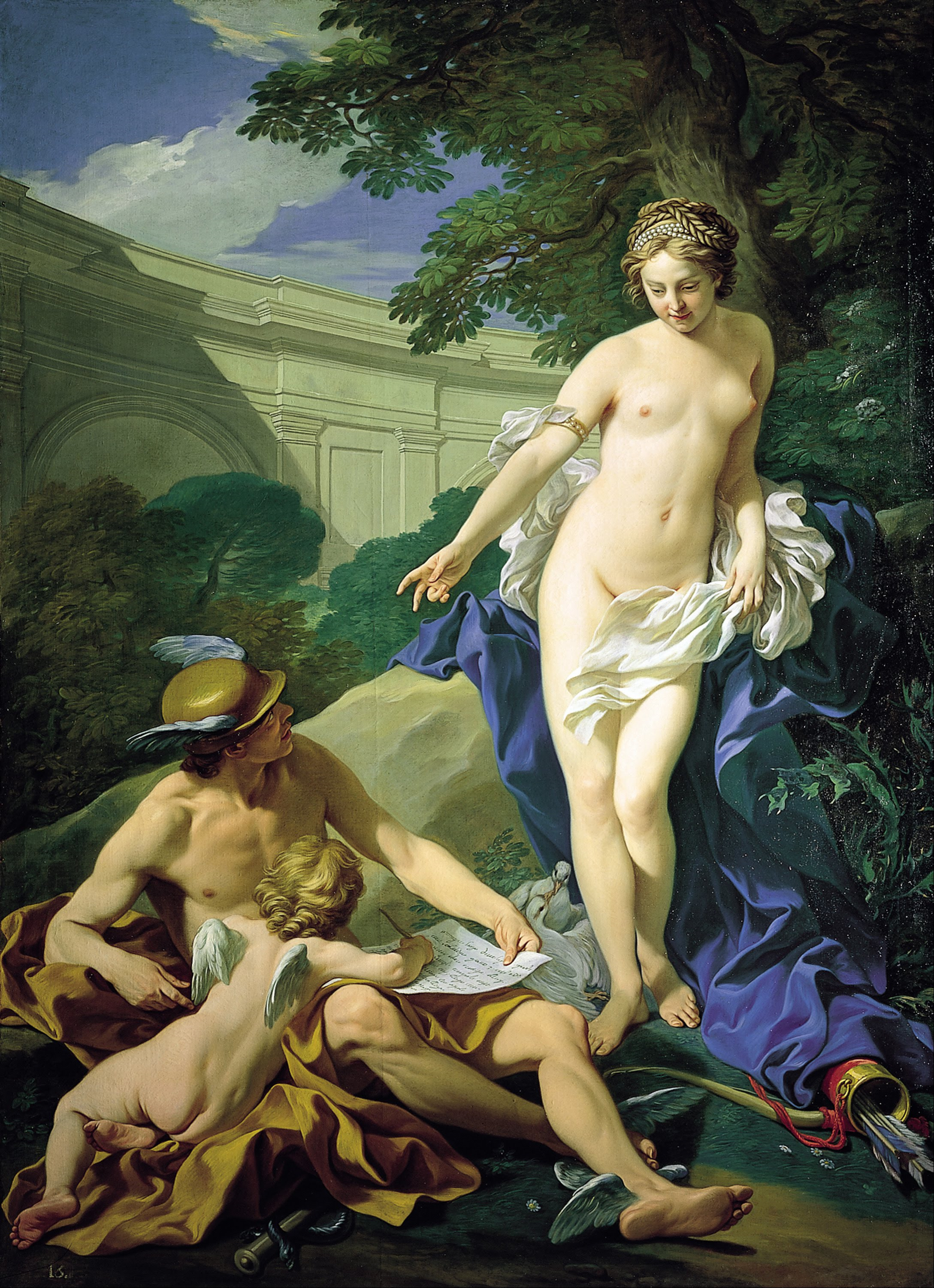
Venus, Mercury and Cupid, Louis Michel van Loo (1748)

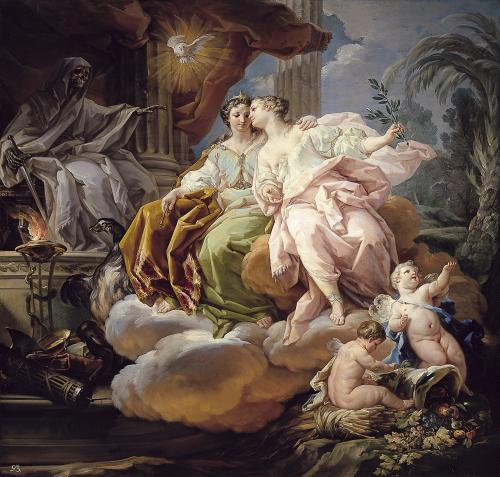
Allegory of Peace and Justice, Corrado Giaquinto (1754)

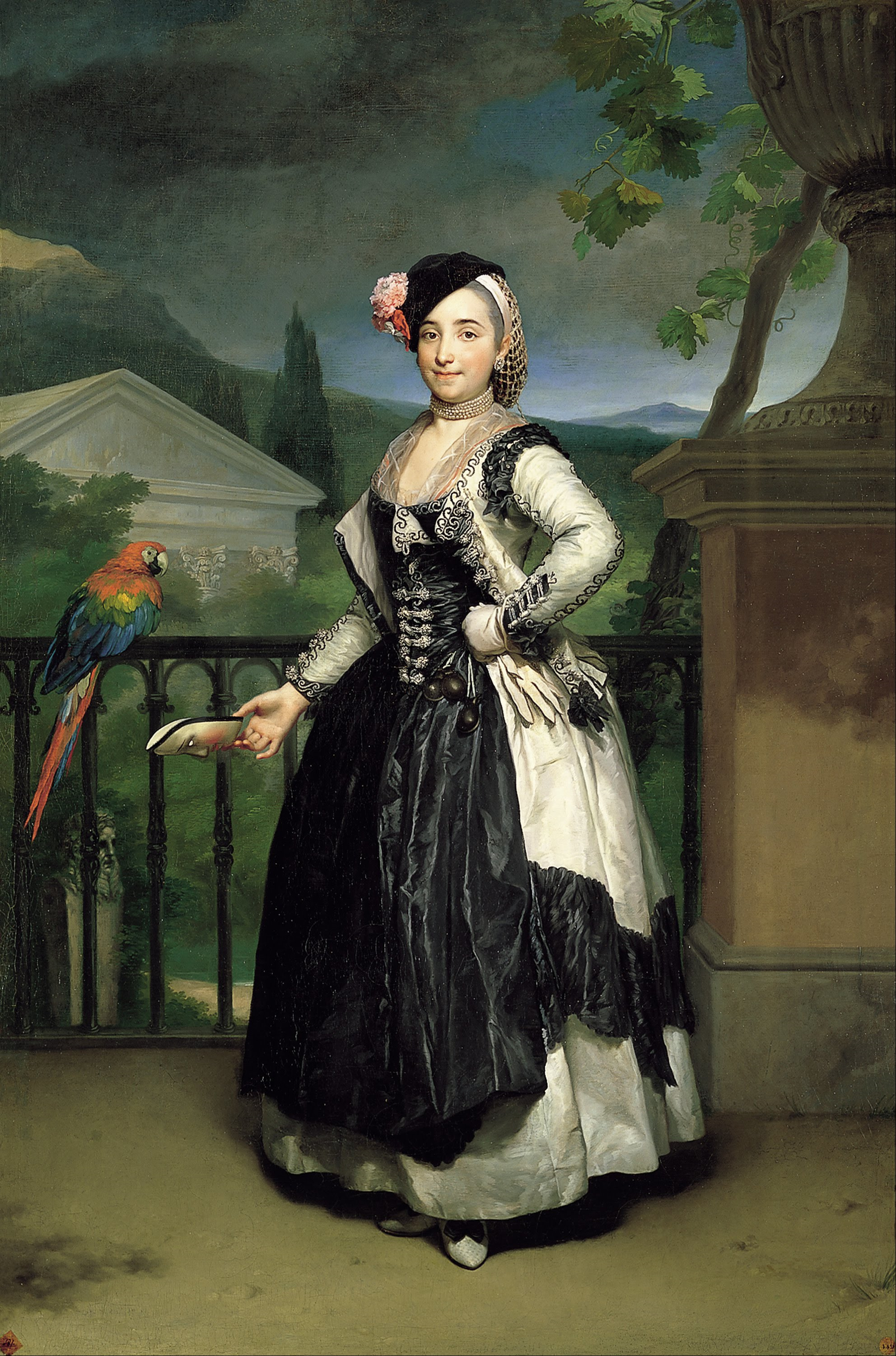
Portrait of the marquesa de Llano, Anton Raphael Mengs (1770)

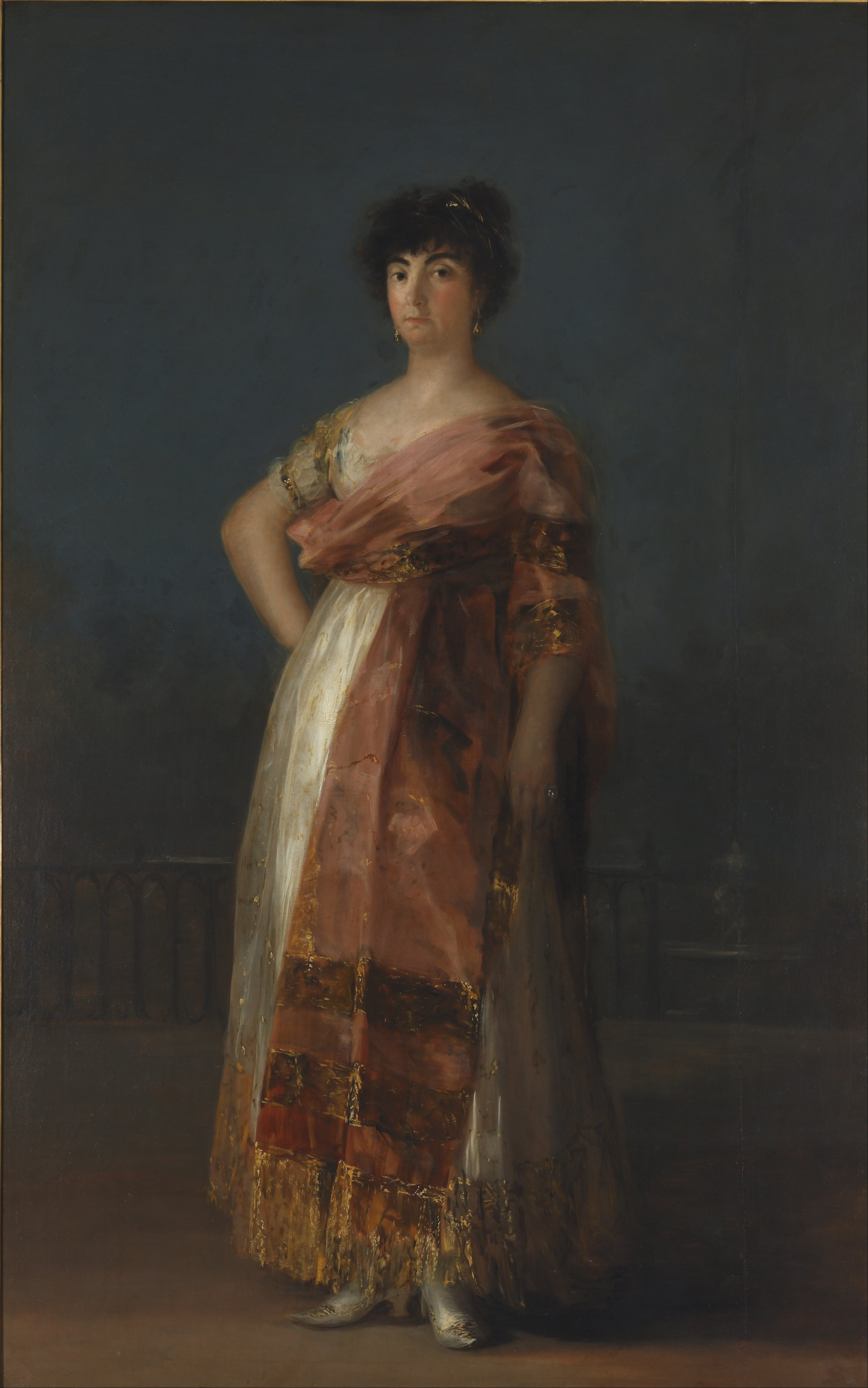
La tirana, Francisco de Goya (c. 1792)

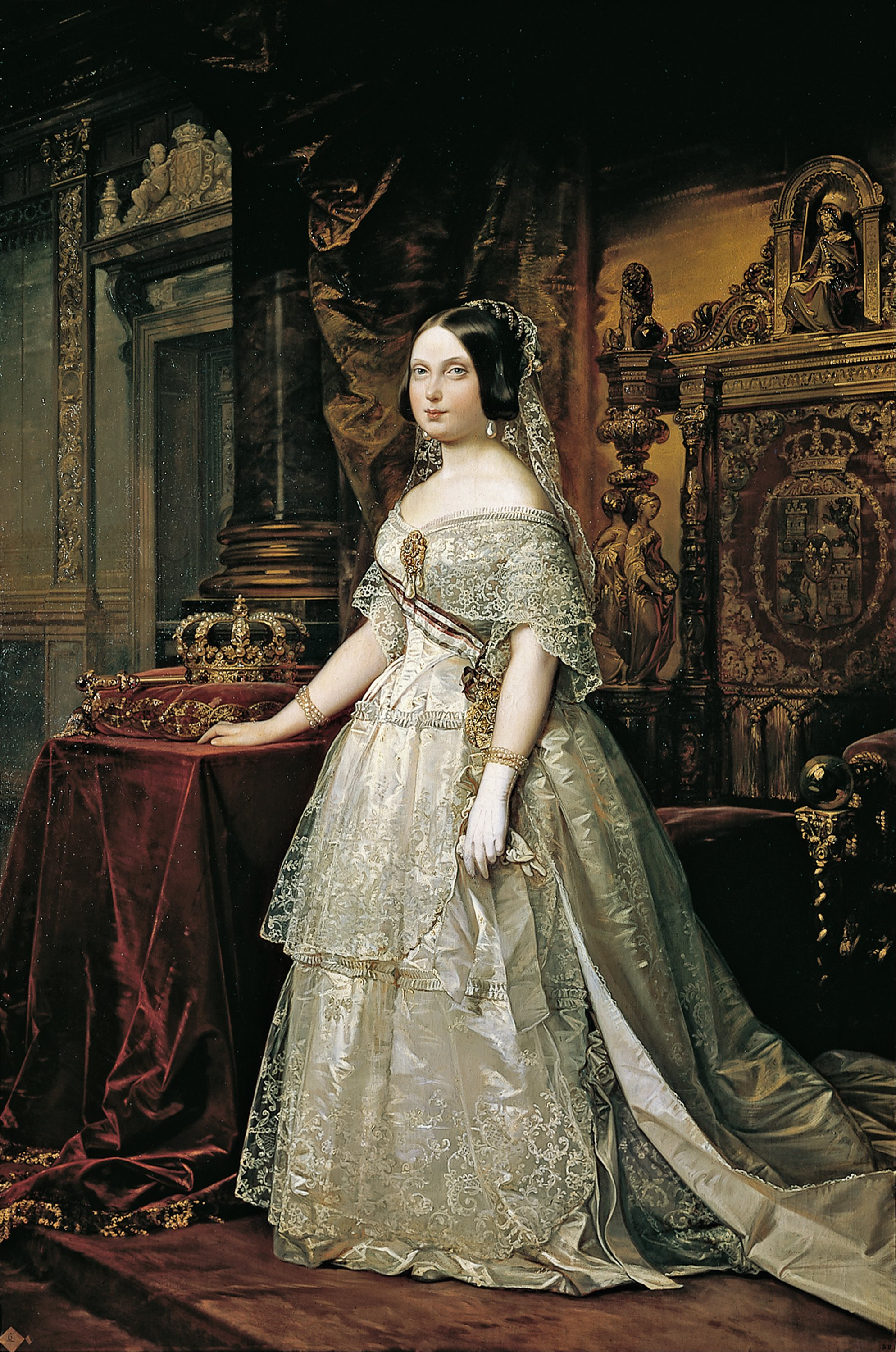
Portrait of Isabel II, Federico de Madrazo (1844)

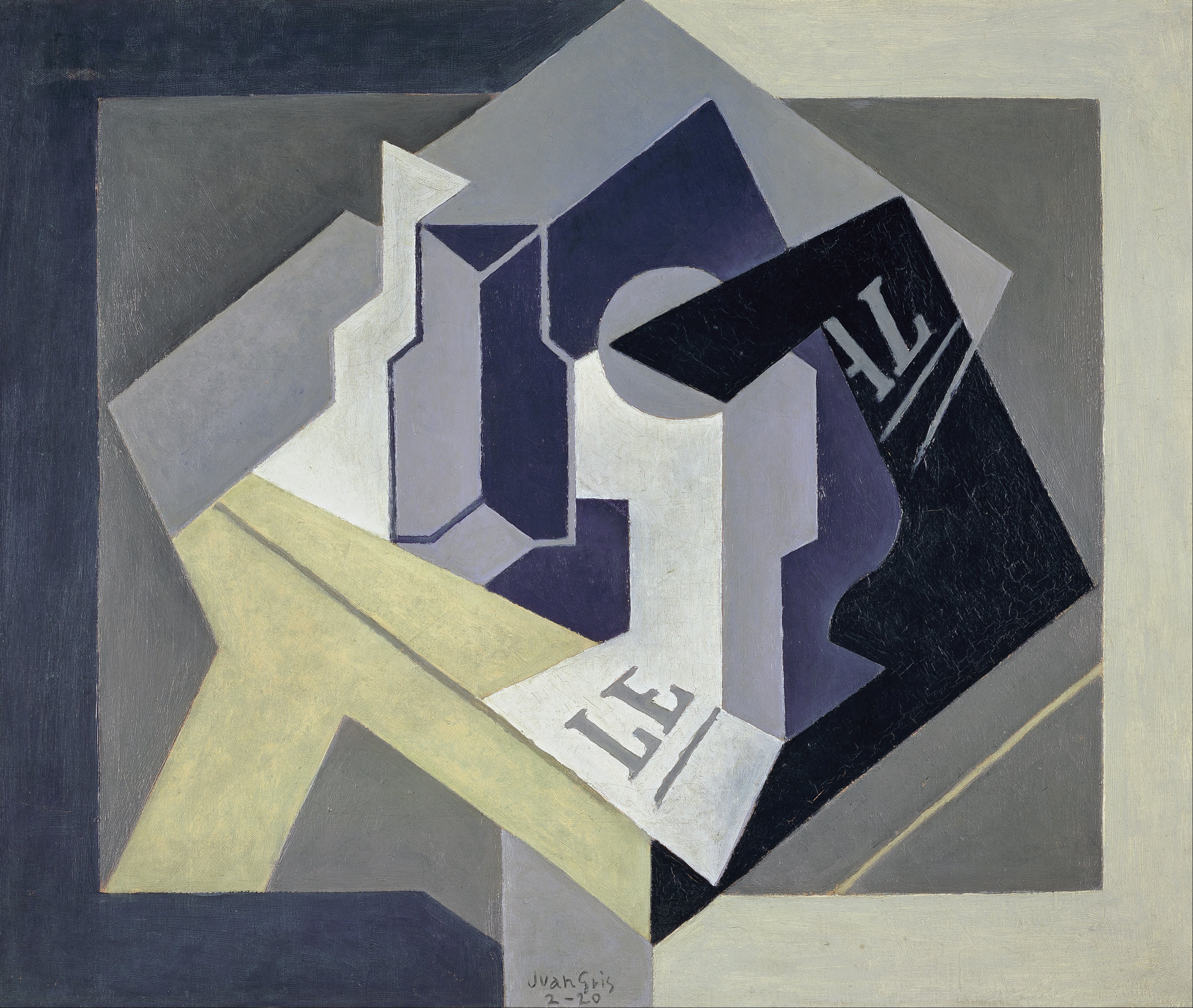
Fruit Bowl and Newspaper, Juan Gris (1920)
