= Witches' Sabbath (The Great He-Goat) =

Painting by Francisco de Goya

- El gran cabrón (Spanish)
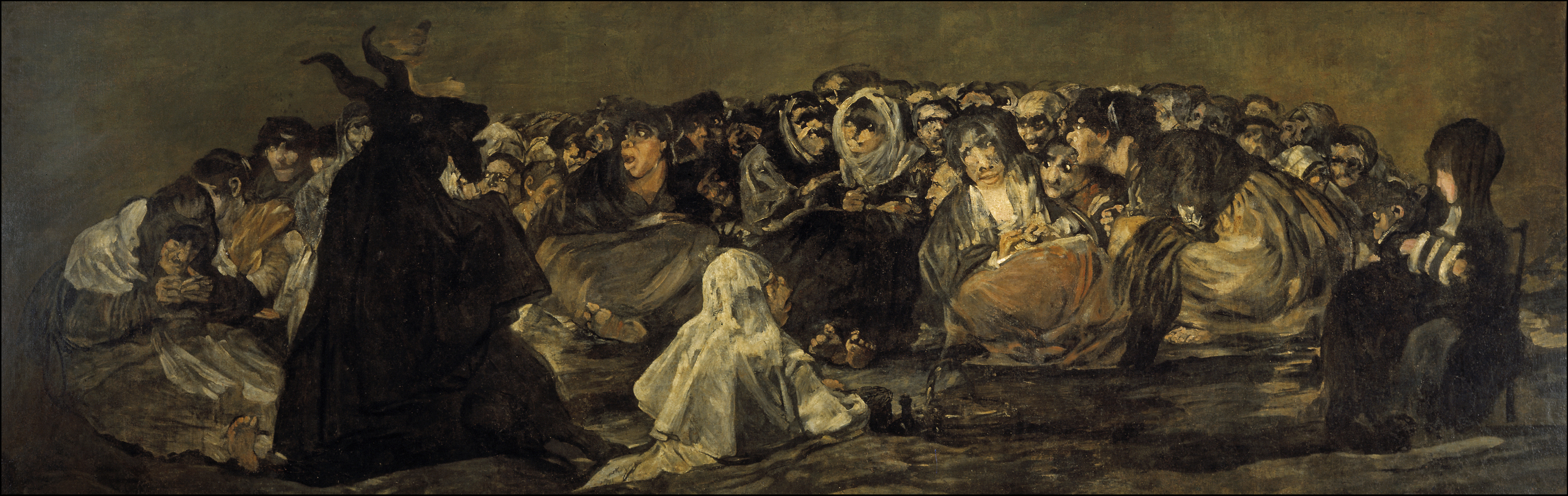
- Artist: Francisco de Goya
- Year: 1820–1823
- Medium: Oil on plaster wall transferred to canvas
- Dimensions: 140.5 cm × 435.7 cm (55.3 in × 171.5 in)
- Location: Museo del Prado, Madrid

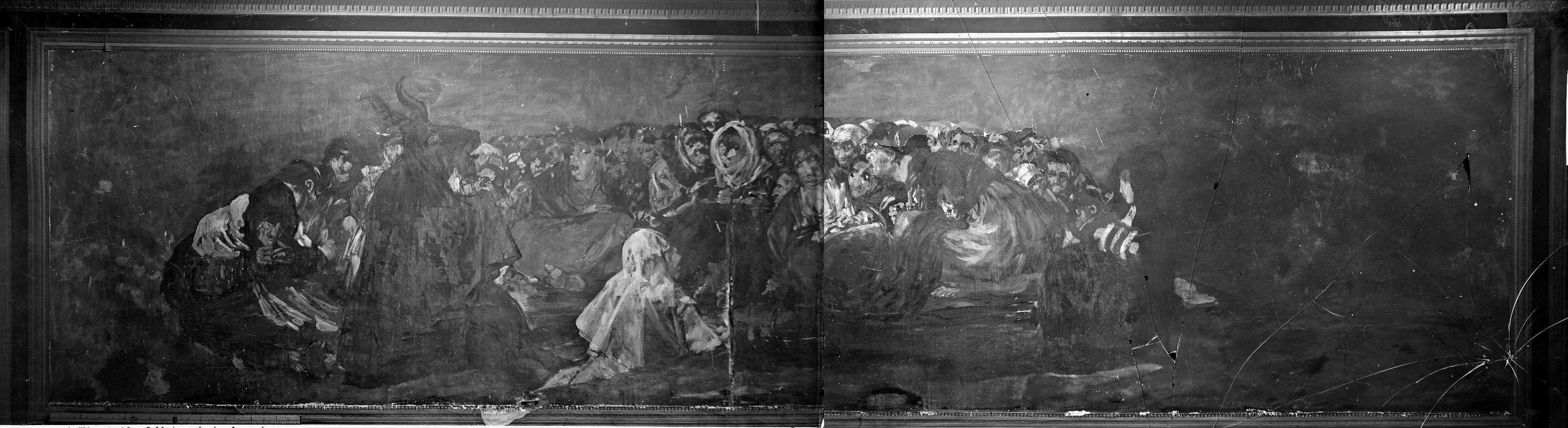
Merger of two photographs by Jean Laurent taken in 1874, before the removal of badly damaged landscape to the far left and right during the transfer to canvas. The cutting down significantly altered the painting's centre of balance.

Witches' Sabbath or The Great He-Goat (Spanish: Aquelarre or El gran cabrón) are names given to an oil mural by the Spanish artist Francisco de Goya, completed sometime between 1820 and 1823. It depicts a Witches' Sabbath and evokes themes of violence, intimidation, ageing and death; Satan hulks in the form of a goat in moonlit silhouette over a coven of terrified old witches. Goya was then around 75 years old, living alone and suffering from acute mental and physical distress.

The work is one of the fourteen Black Paintings that Goya applied in oil on the plaster walls of his house, the Quinta del Sordo. The series was completed in secret: he did not title any of the works or leave a record of his intentions in creating them. Absent of fact, Witches' Sabbath is generally seen by some art historians as a satire on the credulity of the age, a condemnation of superstition and the witch trials of the Spanish Inquisition. As with the other works in the group, Witches' Sabbath reflects its painter's disillusionment and can be linked thematically to his earlier etching The Sleep of Reason Produces Monsters as well as the Disasters of War print series, another bold political statement published only posthumously.

Around 1874, some fifty years after his death, the plaster murals were taken down and transferred to canvas supports. Witches' Sabbath was much wider before transfer – it was the broadest of the Black Paintings. During the transfer about 140 cm (55 in) of the painting were cut from the right-hand side.

== Background ==
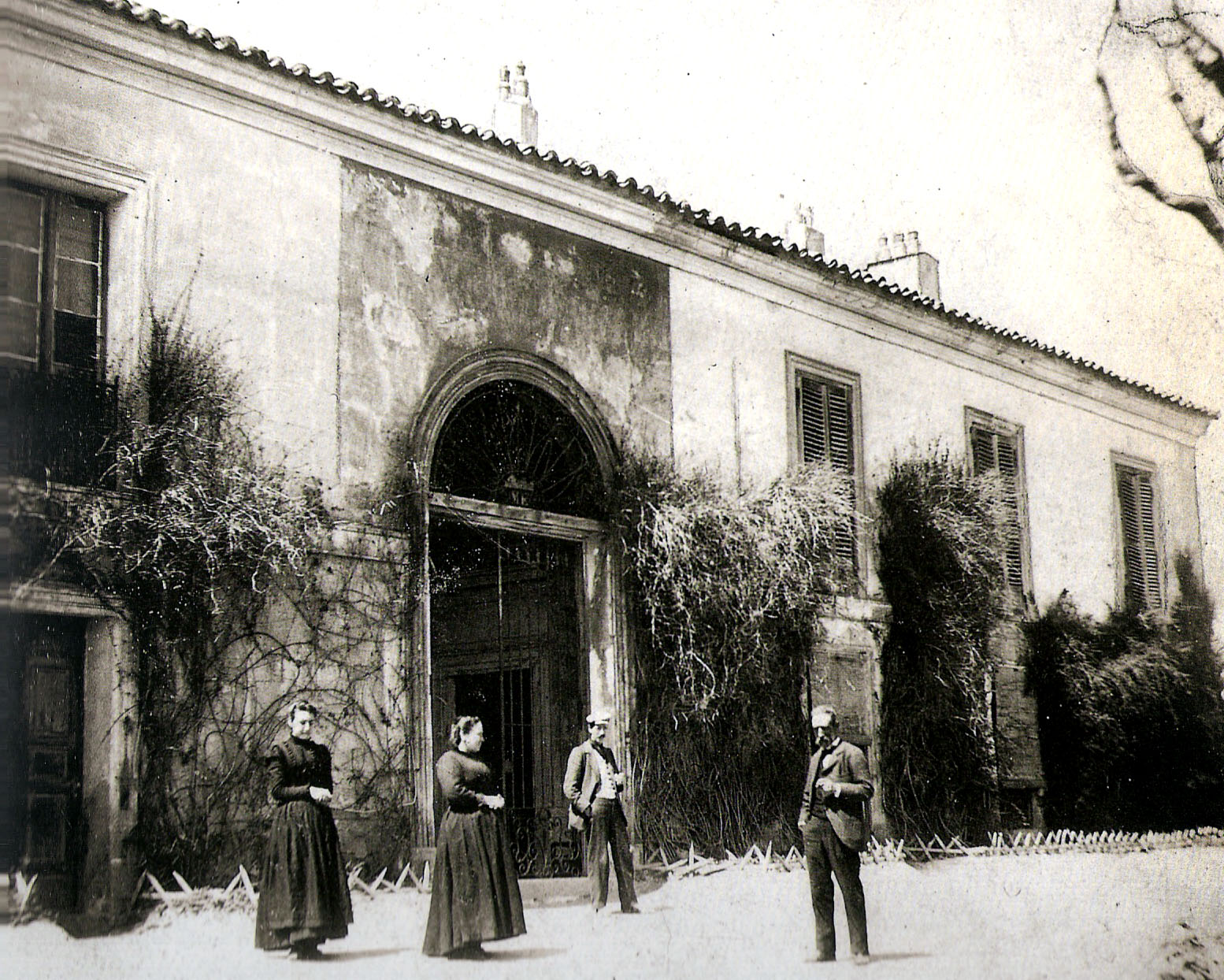
Quinta del Sordo, photographed c. 1900

Goya did not title any of the 14 Black Paintings; their modern names came about after his death. They are not inscribed, mentioned in his letters, (Note: As he had with the Caprichos and Disasters of War series.) and there are no records of him speaking of them. (Note: A contemporary inventory compiled by Goya's friend, the painter Antonio Brugada, records fifteen.) The works today are known by a variety of titles, most of which date to around the 1860s, likely given by his children or by his close friend Bernardo de Iriarte. The title El Gran Cabrón (The Great He-Goat) was given by painter Antonio Brugada (1804–1863). The Basque term for a Witches' Sabbath, akelarre, is the source of the Spanish title Aquelarre and a derivation of akerra, the Basque word for a male goat, which may have been combined with the word larre ("field") to arrive at akelarre.

Records of Goya's later life are relatively scant; no first-hand accounts of his thoughts from this time survive. He deliberately suppressed a number of his works from this period – most notably the Disasters of War series – which are today considered amongst his finest. He was tormented by a dread of old age and fear of madness, the latter possibly from anxiety caused by an undiagnosed illness that left him deaf from the early 1790s. (Note: The cause of Goya's illness is unknown; theories range from polio to syphilis to lead poisoning.) Goya had been a successful and royally placed artist, but withdrew from public life during his final years. From the late 1810s, he lived in near-solitude outside Madrid in a farmhouse converted into a studio. The house had become known as la Quinta del Sordo ("the House of the Deaf Man"), after the nearest farmhouse had coincidentally also belonged to a deaf man.

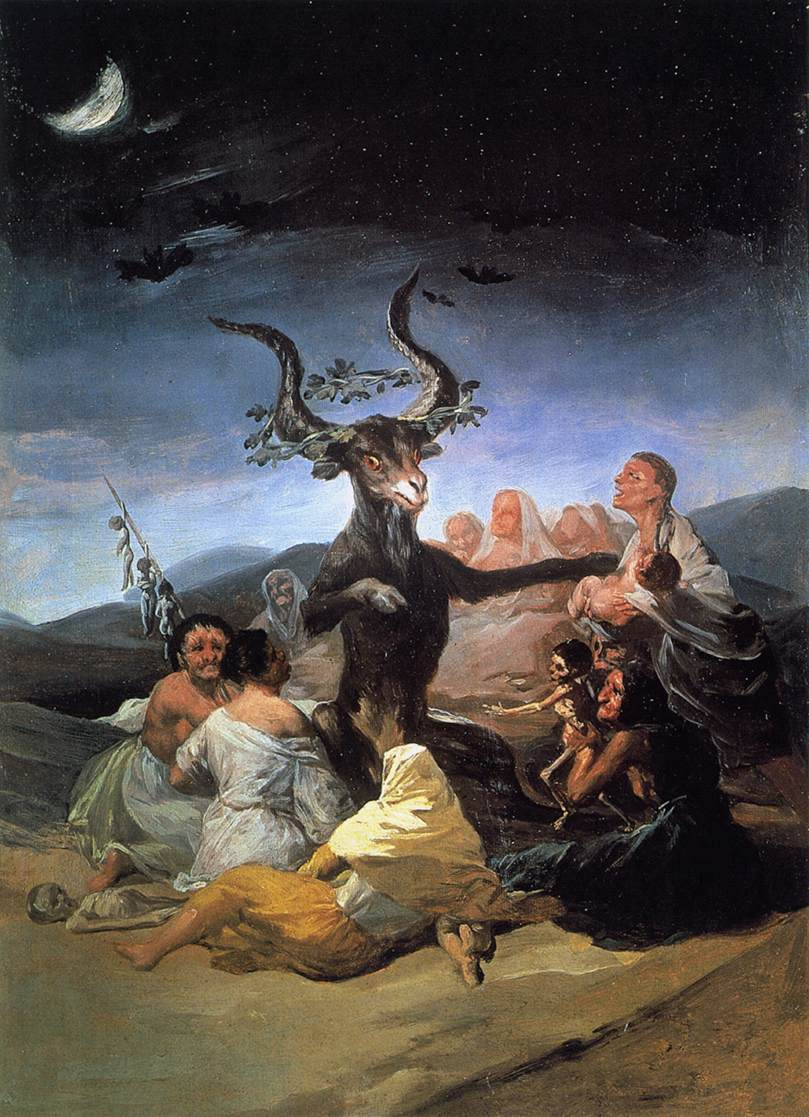
Witches' Sabbath, 1798. Goya's depictions of witchcraft mocked what he saw as medieval fears exploited for political gain.

From his surviving art-works, art historians believe Goya felt alienated from the social and political trends that followed the 1814 restoration of the Bourbon monarchy, and viewed these developments as reactionary means of social control. In his unpublished art, he seems to have railed against what he saw as a tactical retreat into Medievalism. It is thought that he had hoped for political and religious reform, but like many liberals became disillusioned when the restored Bourbon monarchy and Catholic hierarchy rejected the Spanish Constitution of 1812. He went to exile in France in 1824, and ownership of the house passed to his grandson Mariano. An 1830 inventory by Brugada indicates that the work took a full wall between two windows on the first floor, opposite A Pilgrimage to San Isidro. On the wall to the right were Saturn Devouring His Son and Judith and Holofernes. La Leocadia, Two Old Men and Two Old Ones Eating Soup were on the left wall.

The art historian Lawrence Gowing observed that the lower floor was divided thematically, with a male side – Saturn and A Pilgrimage to San Isidro – and a female side – Judith and Holofernes, Witches' Sabbath and La Leocadia. The house changed owners several times before March 1873, when it came into the possession of the Belgian Frédéric Émile d'Erlanger. The murals had deteriorated badly after many years on the walls. To preserve them, the new owner of the house had them transferred to canvas under the direction of the art restorer of the Museo del Prado, Salvador Martínez Cubells. Following their exhibition at the Paris Exposition Universelle in 1878, where they were met with little reaction, d'Erlanger donated them to the Spanish state in 1881.

== Description ==
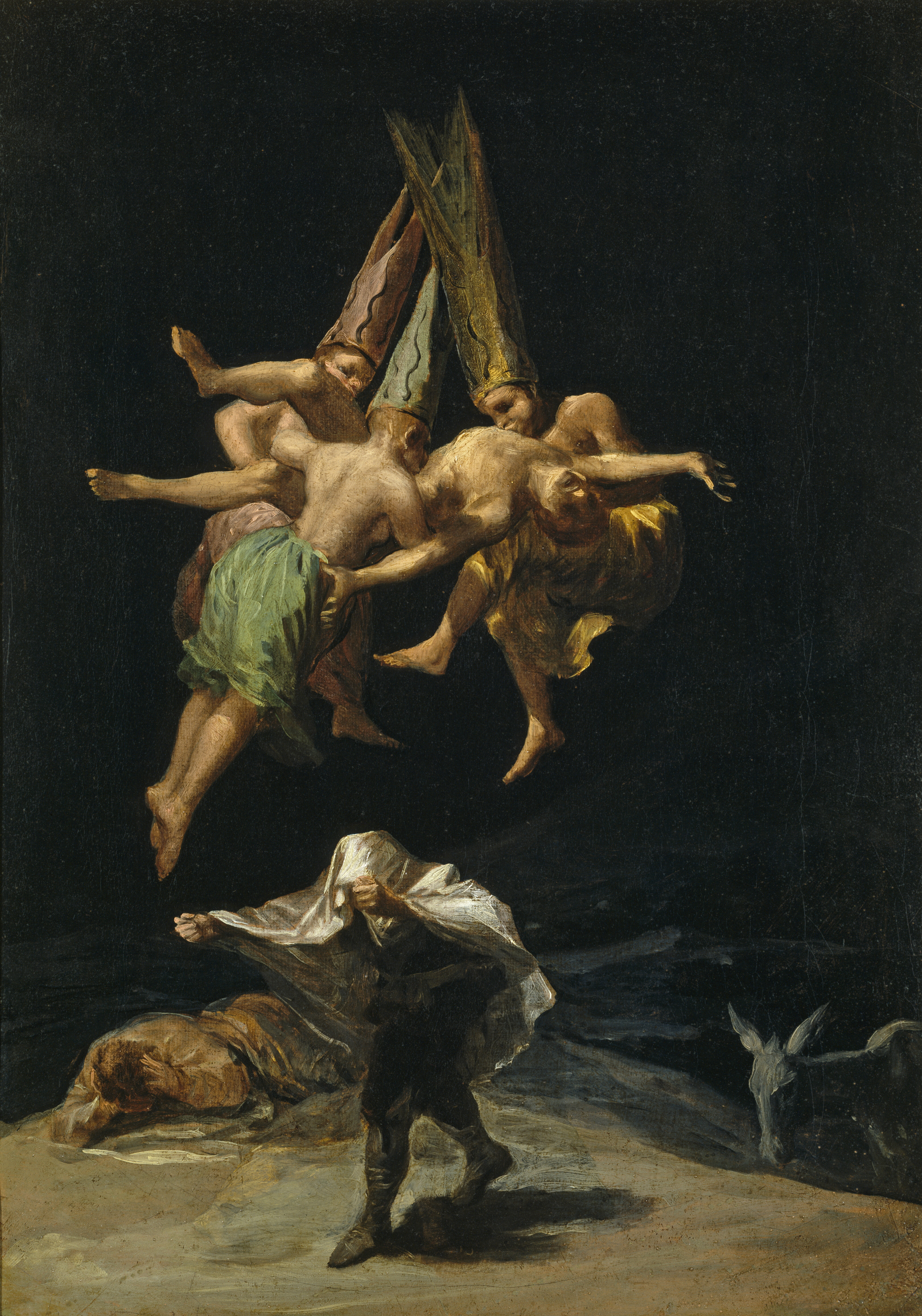
Witches' Flight, 1797–1798. Museo del Prado, Madrid

Satan is dressed in clerical clothing that may be a soutane, and wears a goat-like beard and horns. He preaches from an earth mound and is shown in silhouette, with lines that accentuate his heavy body and gaping mouth. His form may be derived from a 1652 illustration of the Canaanite idol Molech, as illustrated by Athanasius Kircher.

He holds court before a circle of crouched and mostly terrified old women, whom art historians usually describe as a coven of witches. Some bow their heads in fear, others look towards him in open-mouthed and rapt awe. Satan's absolute power over the women has been compared to that of the king in Goya's 1815 The Junta of the Philippines, where authority is gained not from respect or personal charisma, but through fear and domination. The women are a mixture of old and young, and have similar twisted features; all but one are scowling, nervous and obsequious. Goya's use of tone to create atmosphere is reminiscent of both Velázquez and Jusepe de Ribera. The latter was an admirer of Caravaggio and utilised tenebrism and chiaroscuro. Goya learned from these sources, and from Rembrandt, some of whose prints he owned.

An old woman sits to the right of the goat, her back to the viewer. Her face is half hidden, and she wears a white-hooded headdress resembling a nun's habit. She sits alongside bottles and vials on the ground to her right. Art critic Robert Hughes wonders if they "contain the drugs and philtres needed for the devilish ceremonies". The eyes of some figures are lined with white paint. The faces of the two main figures – the goat and the woman to the far right – are hidden. The woman is separated from the group; she is perhaps a postulant about to be initiated into the coven. She may represent Goya's maid and probable lover Leocadia Weiss, whose full-length portrait appears in the same series.

== Technique ==
As with the other Black Paintings, Goya began with a black background which he painted over with lighter pigments, then with broad and heavy brushstrokes of grey, blue, and brown. The darker areas were achieved by leaving the black under-paint exposed; this is most obvious in the figure of the Devil. The plaster was underlaid with thick carbon black before the paint was applied in hues of white lead, Prussian blue, vermilion of mercury, and crystals of powdered glass, orpiment and iron oxides. He likely worked with mixed materials.

Technical analysis indicates that most of the Black Paintings began with preparatory drawings. Witches' Sabbath is the exception; the final composition seems to have been painted directly onto the wall. The art historian Fred Licht described Goya's brushwork as "clumsy, ponderous, and rough" and in areas lacking the finish found in his earlier work. Licht believes this was a deliberate technique intended to convey his feelings of despair. Unlike the other paintings in the series, Witches' Sabbath was not significantly altered by Goya after his initial draft.

== Interpretation ==
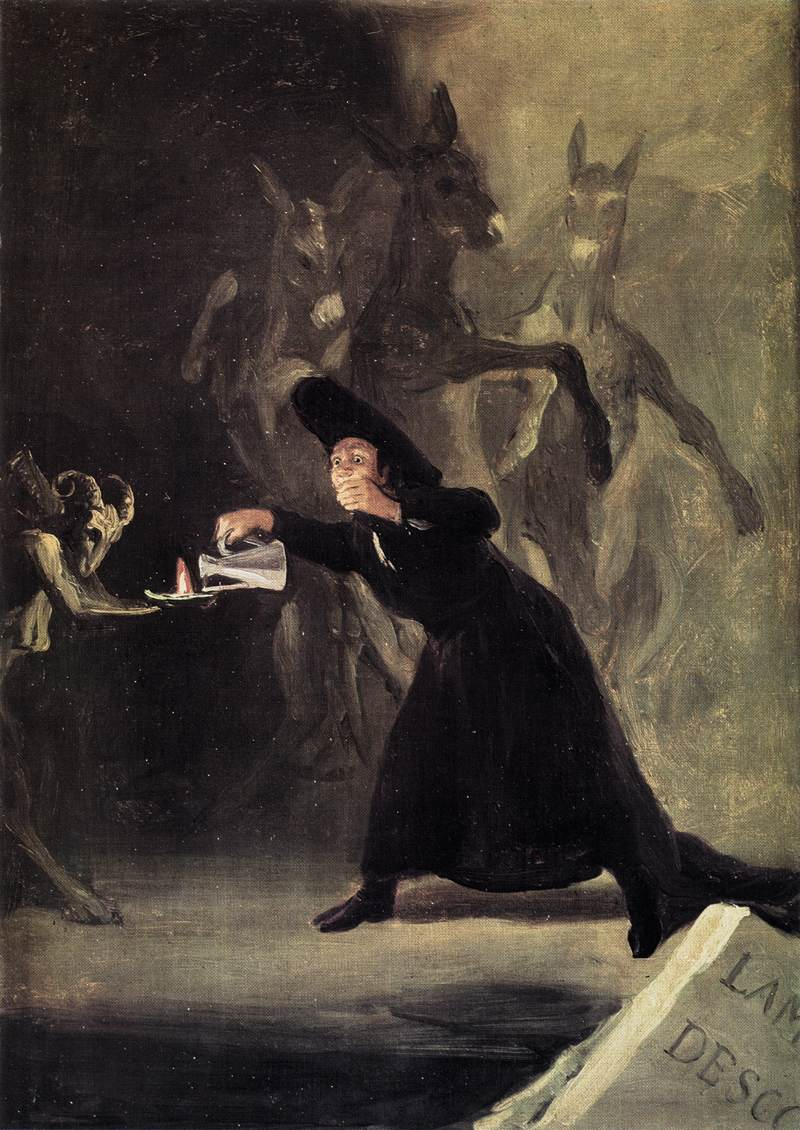
The Bewitched Man, 1798. National Gallery, London

There is no record of Goya's thoughts during this period. He completed the series while recuperating from an illness, possibly lead poisoning, in considerable mental and physical pain. Witches' Sabbath is believed to be a rather bitter but silent protest against the royalists and clergy who had retaken control of Spain after the Peninsular War of 1807–14. Spanish advocates of the Enlightenment sought to redistribute land to the peasants, educate women, publish a vernacular Bible, and by replacing superstition with reason, put an end to the Inquisition. Outbursts of witch hunting, as occurred during the Logroño Inquisition, was an appalling regression to liberals such as Goya.

Goya was a court painter and thus part of the established order. Yet numerous paintings and etchings that have since emerged suggest his convictions favoured liberalism. He seems to have kept such beliefs private, only expressing them in his private art; his more sensitive works were not published at the time, probably for fear of reprisal or persecution. In Witches' Sabbath, Goya seems to mock and ridicule the superstition, fear, and irrationality of those placing their faith in ghouls, quack doctors and tyrants.

Goya had used witchcraft imagery in his 1797–1798 Caprichos print series, and in his 1789 painting Witches' Sabbath, where the Devil is also depicted as a goat surrounded by a circle of terrified women. The 1798 painting uses witchcraft imagery in a manner that inverts the order of traditional Christian iconography. The goat extends his left rather than right hoof towards the child, the quarter moon faces out at the left-hand corner of the canvas. These inversions may be a metaphor for the irrational undermining of the liberals who argued for scientific, religious, and social progress. Many of the scientific bodies then active were condemned as subversive and their members were accused as "agents of the devil".

Describing the techniques employed in the Black Paintings, particularly the visible black ground paint, art historian Barbara Stafford said that "by brusquely inlaying spots of light with prevailing darkness, Goya's aquatinted and painted visions demonstrated the powerlessness of the unmoored intellect to unify a monstrously hybrid experience according to its own a priori transcendental laws".

== Restoration ==
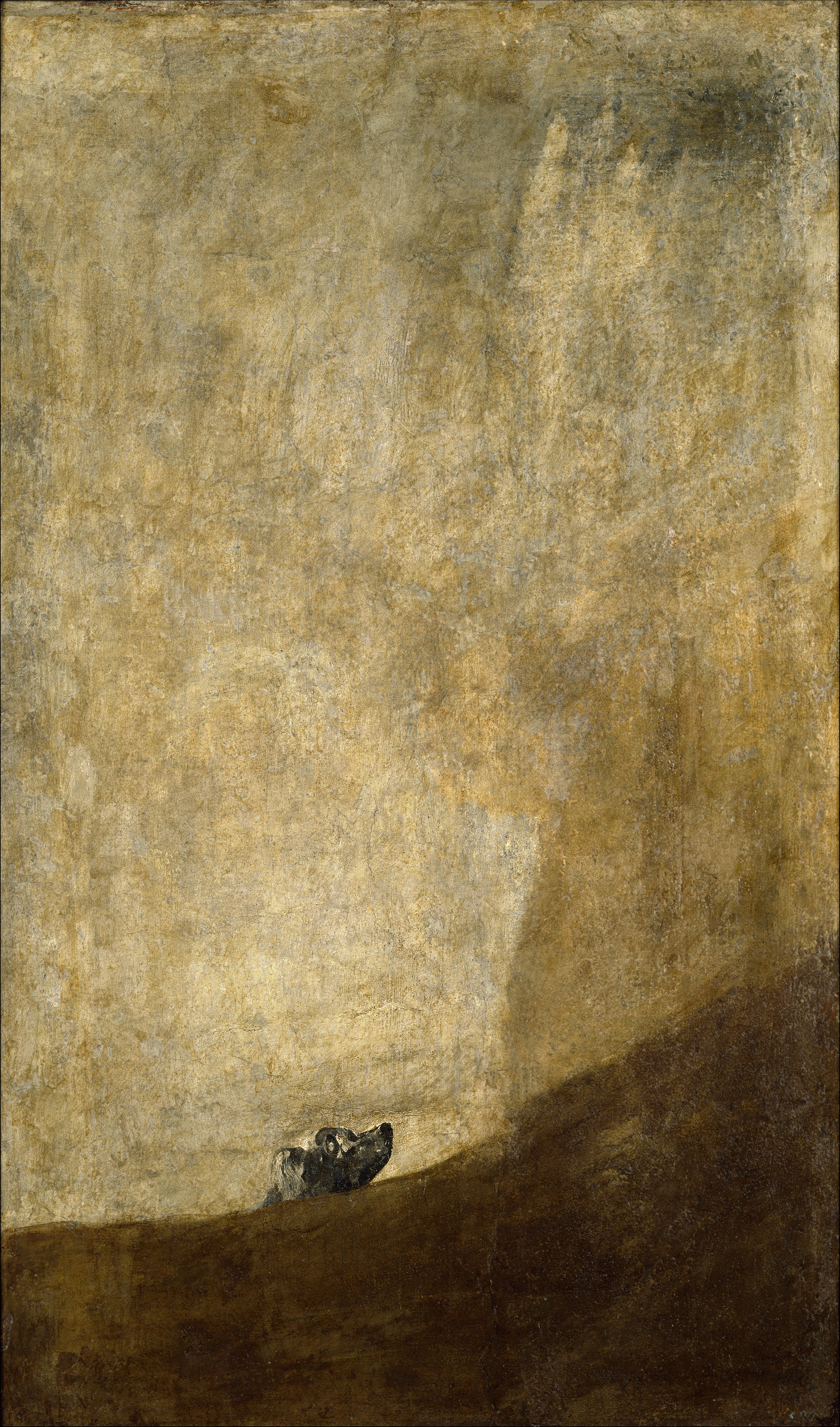
The Dog, 1820–1823

Between 1874 and 1878, restorer Salvador Martinez Cubells removed more than 140 centimeters (55 inches) of landscape and sky to the right of the postulant witch, where the paint had been badly damaged. This alteration significantly shifted the work's centre of balance; the young woman was no longer near the middle of the composition, thus reducing both her prominence and the possibility that she was seen to be the focus of the work.

Some art historians believe the removed area on the right was beyond restoration, given how unlikely it is that a large section of a painting by an artist of Goya's stature would be lightly discarded. However, the removal may have been for aesthetic reasons, with the resultant empty space intended to bring balance to a canvas perceived as overlong. If this was Cubells' reasoning, it was misguided (he was not an accomplished painter and lacked insight into Goya's intentions); Goya had often used empty space to dramatic and evocative effect, as seen in The Dog from the same series, and his print Unfortunate Events in the Front Seats of the Ring of Madrid, and the Death of the Mayor of Torrejón.

In both works, Goya left large empty areas in what seems to have been a reaction against contemporary conventions of balance and harmony. This approach became highly influential on modern painters such as Francis Bacon, who greatly admired Goya's depiction of what Bacon described as "the void".

== Condition ==
The painting is in poor condition. Time and a complicated transfer involving mounting crumbling plaster onto canvas lead to structural damage and paint loss. It was seriously damaged even before its removal from the walls of Goya's home; the base of dry plaster may have contributed to its early deterioration. Frescos completed on dry (rather than wet) plaster cannot survive for a long period on a roughened surface. Evan Connell believed that in applying oil to plaster Goya "made a technical mistake that all but guaranteed disintegration".

Many of the Black Paintings were significantly altered during the restoration of the 1870s, and critic Arthur Lubow describes the works hanging in the Prado today as "at best a crude facsimile of what Goya painted". We know the effect of many of Martinez Cubells' changes from his accounts, but they inevitably lack objectivity. More reliable are two overlapping photographs taken in preparation for the restoration by Jean Laurent, now in the Courtauld Institute's Witt Library. (Note: Laurent took seven confirmed photographs of the series and two more are probably his work.) They show the painting in situ in the Quinta del Sordo and are the most reliable indicators of its appearance before restoration.

== See also ==
- List of works by Francisco Goya
