= Two Old Men =

Painting by Goya

Two Old Men / Two Monks / An Old Man and a Monk
- Dos viejos / Dos frailes / Un viejo y un fraile (Spanish)
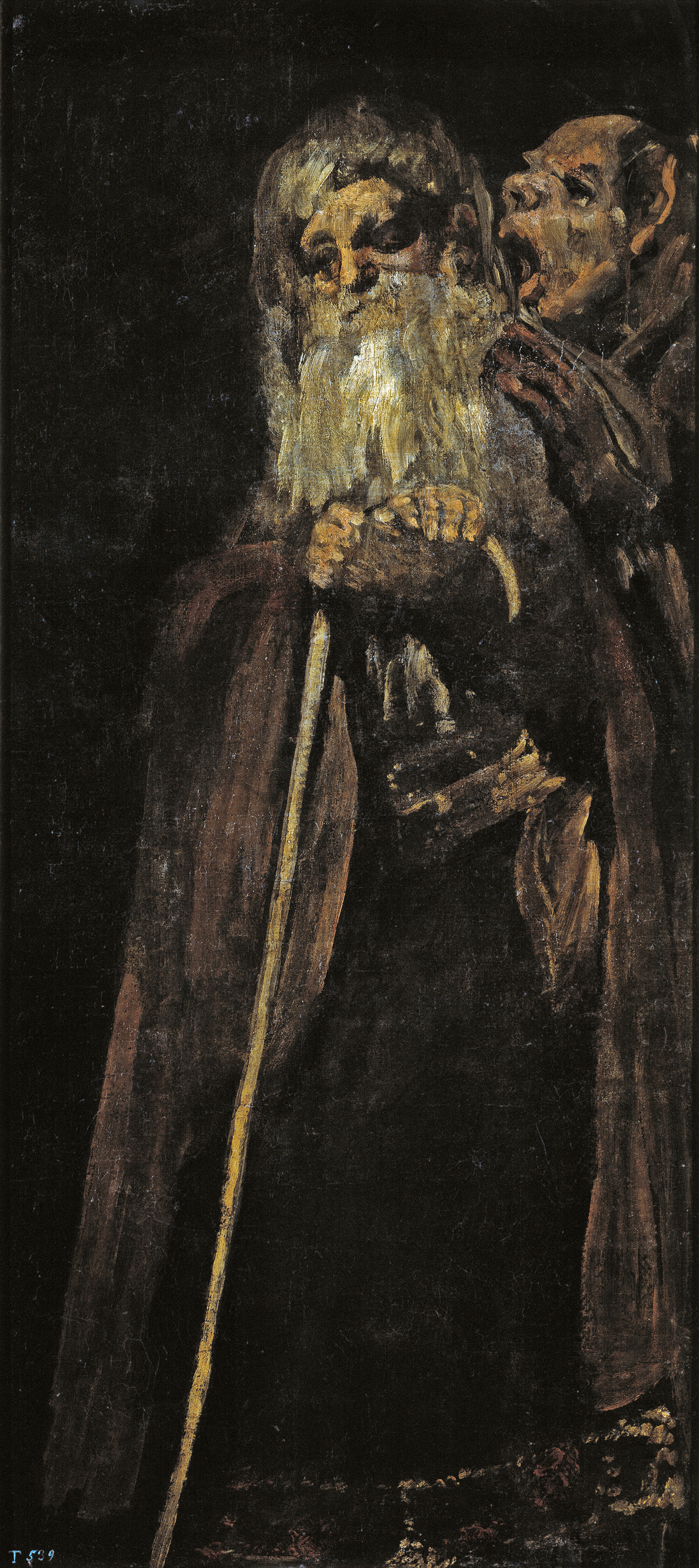
- Artist: Francisco Goya
- Year: 1819–1823
- Medium: Oil mural transferred to canvas
- Dimensions: 146 cm × 66 cm (57 in × 26 in)
- Location: Museo del Prado, Madrid
- Accession: P000759
- Website: artwork at www.museodelprado.es

Two Old Men, also known as Two Monks or An Old Man and a Monk (Spanish: Dos viejos, Dos frailes, or Un viejo y un fraile), are names given to one of the 14 Black Paintings painted by Francisco Goya between 1819–23. At the time Goya was in his mid-seventies and was undergoing a great amount of physical and mental stress after two bouts of an unidentified illness. The works were rendered directly onto the interior walls of the house known as Quinta del Sordo ("The House of the Deaf Man"), which Goya purchased in 1819.

== Background ==
In 1819 Goya purchased a property for c. 60,000 Reales, set on seventeen acres of land south-west of Madrid, in close vicinity to the Manzanares River and the Segovia bridge. In his seventy-third year Goya retired to this property in the country. The house was coincidentally known as the Quinta Del Sordo (House of the Deaf man) after its previous owner. In 1819 Goya was struck down by a mysterious disease, possibly a relapse of the illness that had first afflicted him some twenty-five years earlier, though little is known about the nature or treatment of either. This disease left Goya gravely ill and it was only through the medical intervention of a friend of Goya, Dr Arrieta, that his life was saved. In thanks for the Doctor's services he painted a portrait of Arrieta and himself, inscribing it with a dedication: “Goya, in gratitude to his friend Arrieta: for the compassion and care with which he saved his life during the acute and dangerous illness he suffered towards the end of the year 1819 in his seventy-third year.” (see Self-portrait with Dr Arrieta).

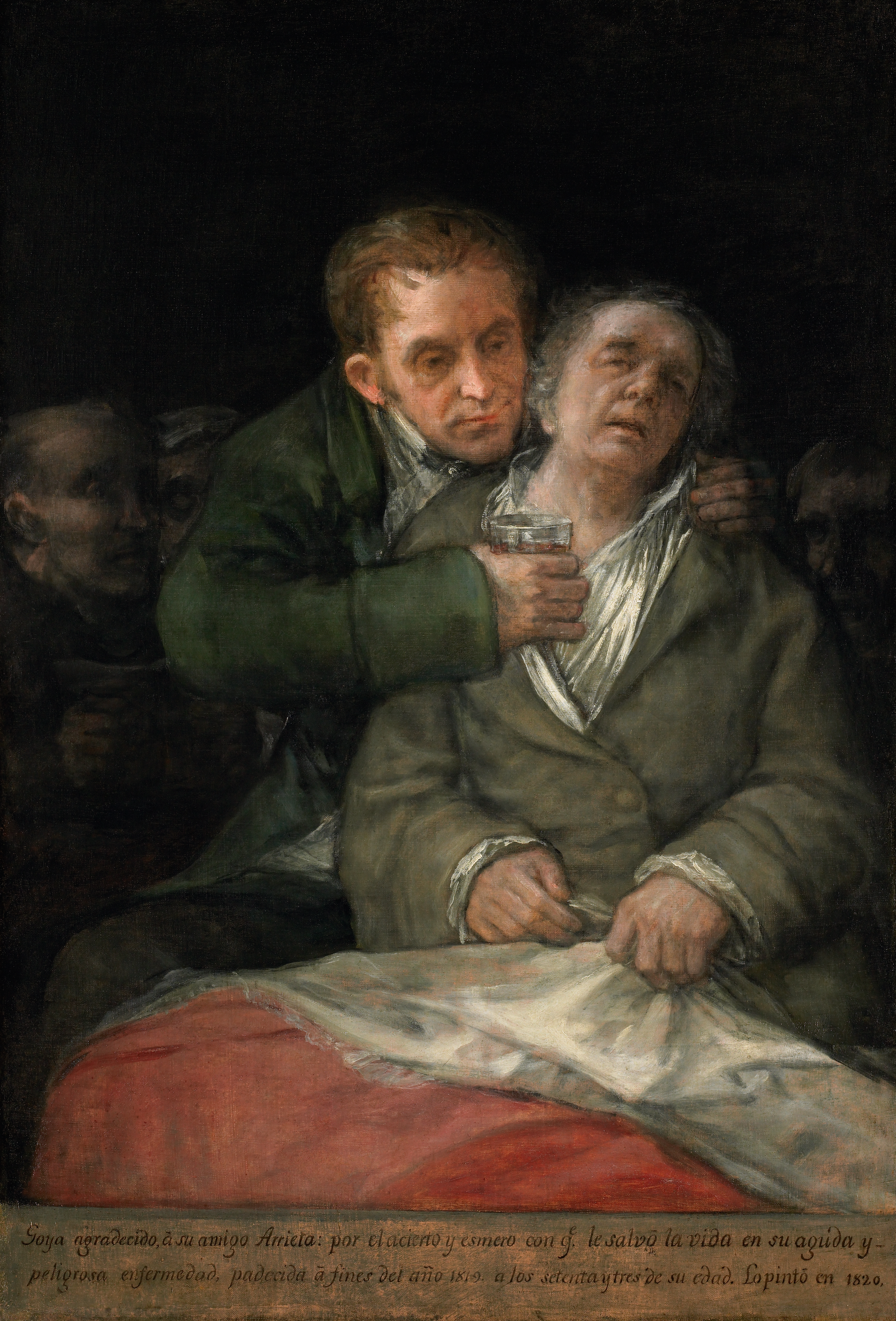
Self-portrait with Dr Arrieta, 1820.

The effects of this illness are often cited as the catalyst for the creation of the Black Paintings as it left the artist physically and mentally strained in its wake. There is little primary evidence to explain why the works were created or indeed what they mean, leaving art historians to interpret the works, and in turn to surmise why Goya created them. The Black Paintings were probably never intended to be seen by anyone but the artist. Two Old Men likely occupied a position on the first floor, opposite Judith and Holofernes.

== Description ==
In this work we see two elderly figures dressed in Friar's habits standing before a black background. The primary figure stands at the centre of the composition dominating the foreground; the man stands slightly hunched with a pensive expression donning his face. His long grey beard is framed by his arms that rest easily on a shepherd's cane. Beside him is a highly caricatured figure whose face appears bestial or corpse-like. This figure seems to be shouting into the ear of his companion, which may be an allusion to Goya's deafness. This dark figure provides a foreboding presence within the composition seeming to strongly suggest a negative connotation of some sort. Perhaps the bestial figure provides a commentary on the artist's own fears of madness, a subject he had previously explored in various capacities throughout his artistic career. It is possible that the primary figure may represent Chronos, the god of time, though this seems unlikely when we consider the situation and aspect of the secondary figure. However, if we were to consider this figure as a Memento Mori, working in unison with the concept of time, this could well be possible.

There is a noticeable difference between the treatment of the two figures. Calmly resting on his walking stick with a sad but serene expression, the bearded man recalls the philosophers depicted by Velázquez, which had been copied by Goya. In vivid contrast, the features of his monstrous companion recall the Friars depicted by Goya in his Caprichos and Disparates. This figure is very similar to those of another work in the series, Two Old Men Eating. Throughout the series the Black Paintings depict varying levels of dark imagery, but maintain a pervasively sinister undercurrent. The Black Paintings were not intended to be seen by anyone but the artist, one art historian going as far as stating: "these paintings are as close to being hermetically private as any that have ever been produced in the history of Western art."

== Restoration ==
The French banker Baron Frederic-Emil d'Erlanger bought Goya's property in 1873, in an area was primed for development, and paid a considerable sum in order to have the works in the Quinta restored and transferred. Like other paintings in the series, the work was transferred to canvas between 1873 and 1874 under the supervision of Salvador Martínez Cubells, a curator at the Museo del Prado. The owner, Baron Émile d'Erlanger, donated the canvases to the Spanish state in 1881, and they are now on display at the Museo del Prado. Much like many of the works in the series, Two Old Men was in a poor state of repair and underwent substantial restorative work. In early photographs of the work, a range of pre-restoration differences can be seen, most notably a large crack in the plaster in the upper right corner. A range of alterations were made to the work in an attempt to restore it, with particular attention to the primary figure. Cubells has added various highlights to the figure on his forehead, beard and hands, providing a greater level of contrast but an overall loss of quality.

The dark and brooding facial expression of the primary figure has been lessened in the process of restoration, leaving the figure with a contemplative expression. The figure's form itself has been heavily edited in the arms, most notably in the shoulders and hands. This is equally apparent in the face of the second figure that has been altered markedly, the shadows disfigured as a result of degradation. Martinez Cubell's fondness for harsh black lines and simple outlines is particularly apparent in his restoration of the head and face of the figure; in doing so the restorer has lost much of the acuity present within the original work. The effect of Goya's masterful use of dark, tonal variance in moulding his forms has been lost somewhat in restoration.

== Bibliography ==
- Benito Oterino, Agustín, La luz en la quinta del sordo: estudio de las formas y cotidianidad, Madrid, Universidad Complutense, 2002, p. 33. Edición digital ISBN 84-669-1890-6.
- Bozal, Valeriano, Francisco Goya, vida y obra, (2 vols.) Madrid, Tf. Editores, 2005. ISBN 84-96209-39-3.
- Bozal, Valeriano, Pinturas Negras de Goya, Tf. Editores, Madrid, 1997.
- Brown, Jonathan, and Mann. Richard G. (1990) Spanish Paintings of the Fifteenth through Nineteenth Centuries. The Collections of the National Gallery of Art Systematic Catalogue. Washington, D.C.
- Dowling, John (1973). "Buero Vallejo's Interpretation of Goya's 'Black Paintings'". Hispania. 56 (2): 449–457. doi:10.2307/339706. JSTOR 339706.
- Felisati, D.; Sperati, G. (5 October 2010). "Francisco Goya and his illness". Acta Otorhinolaryngologica Italica. 30 (5): 264–270. PMC 3040580. PMID 21804693.
- Glendinning, Nigel, Francisco de Goya, Madrid, Cuadernos de Historia 16 (col. «El arte y sus creadores», nº 30), 1993.
- Glendinning, Nigel, "The Strange Translation of Goya's Black Paintings", The Burlington Magazine, CXVII, 868, 1975. 446.
- Hagen, Rose-Marie and Hagen, Rainer, Francisco de Goya, Cologne, Taschen, 2003. ISBN 3-8228-2296-5.
- Hughes, Robert. Goya. New York: Alfred A. Knopf, 2004. ISBN 0-394-58028-1
- Licht, Fred. Goya: The Origins of the Modern Temper in Art. (Universe Books, 1979).
- Petra ten-Doesschate Chu, Laurinda S. Dixon, “Goya’s ambiguous Saturn” in Twenty-first-century Perspectives on Nineteenth-century Art: Essays in Honor of Gabriel P. Weisberg, (University of Delaware Press; Newark, 2008).
- Robert Havard, The Spanish Eye: Painters and Poets of Spain, (Woodbridge, Tamesis, 2007).
