= Unfortunate Events =

Unfortunate Events may refer to:

- A Series of Unfortunate Events, a book series by Lemony Snicket
  - Lemony Snicket's A Series of Unfortunate Events, a 2004 film
  - A Series of Unfortunate Events (TV series)
- Unfortunate events in the front seats of the ring of Madrid, and the death of the mayor of Torrejón, an etching by Francisco Goya
