= The Dog (Goya) =

Painting by Francisco de Goya

- El Perro (Spanish)
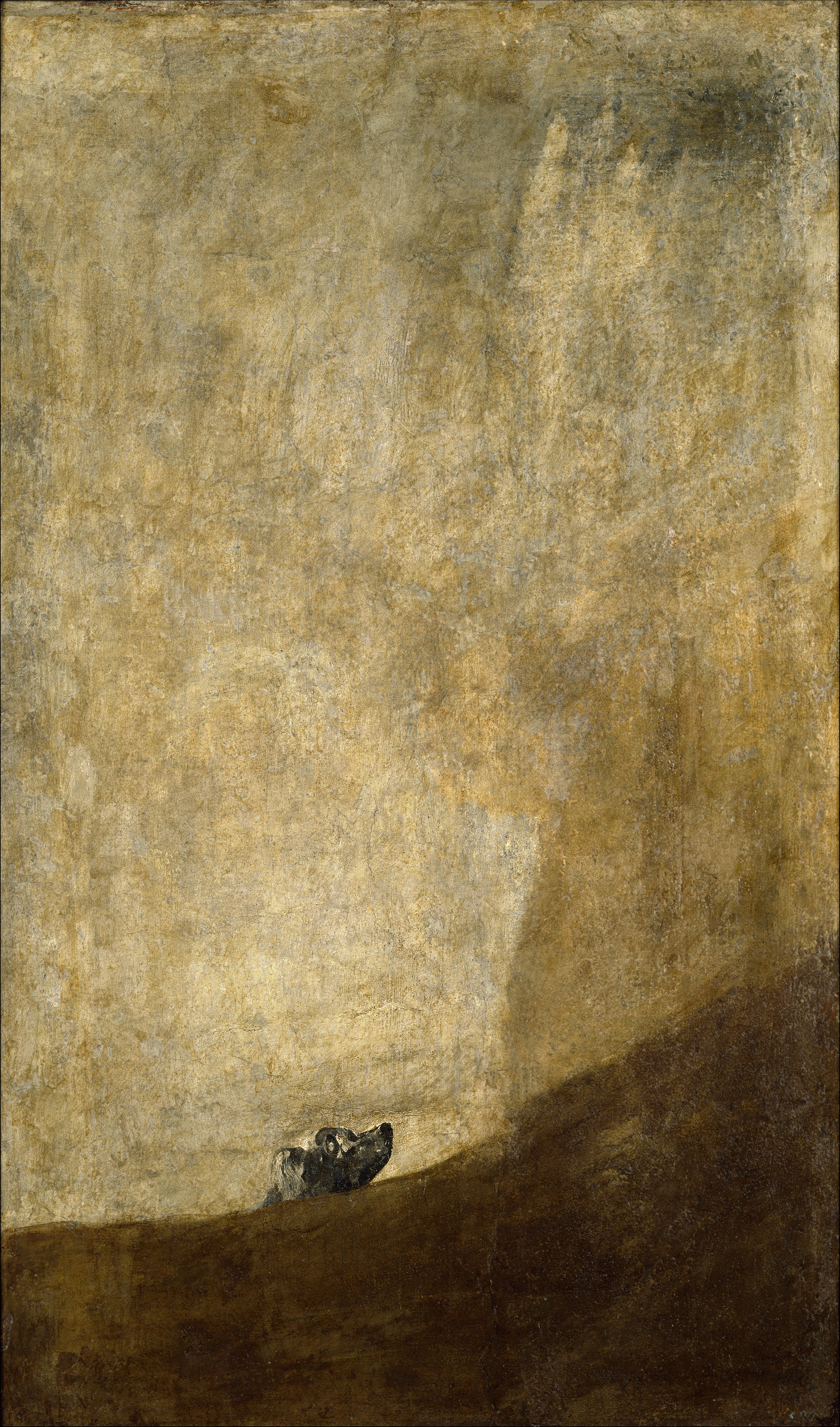
- Artist: Francisco de Goya
- Year: c. 1819–1823
- Type: Oil mural on plaster transferred to canvas
- Dimensions: 131.5 cm × 79.3 cm (51 3/4 in × 31 1/4 in)
- Location: Museo del Prado, Madrid

The Dog (Spanish: El Perro) is the name usually given to a painting by Spanish artist Francisco de Goya, now in the Museo del Prado, Madrid. It shows the head of a dog, looking upwards and to the right. The entire image is blank, except for a dark sloping area near the bottom, which covers the body of the dog. The placard for The Dog painting in The Prado indicates the dog is in distress, apparently drowning.

The Dog is one of Goya's Black Paintings, which he painted directly onto the walls of his house sometime between 1819 and 1823 when he was in his mid-70s, living alone and suffering from acute mental and physical distress. He did not intend the paintings for public exhibition, and they were not removed from the house until 50 years after Goya had left.

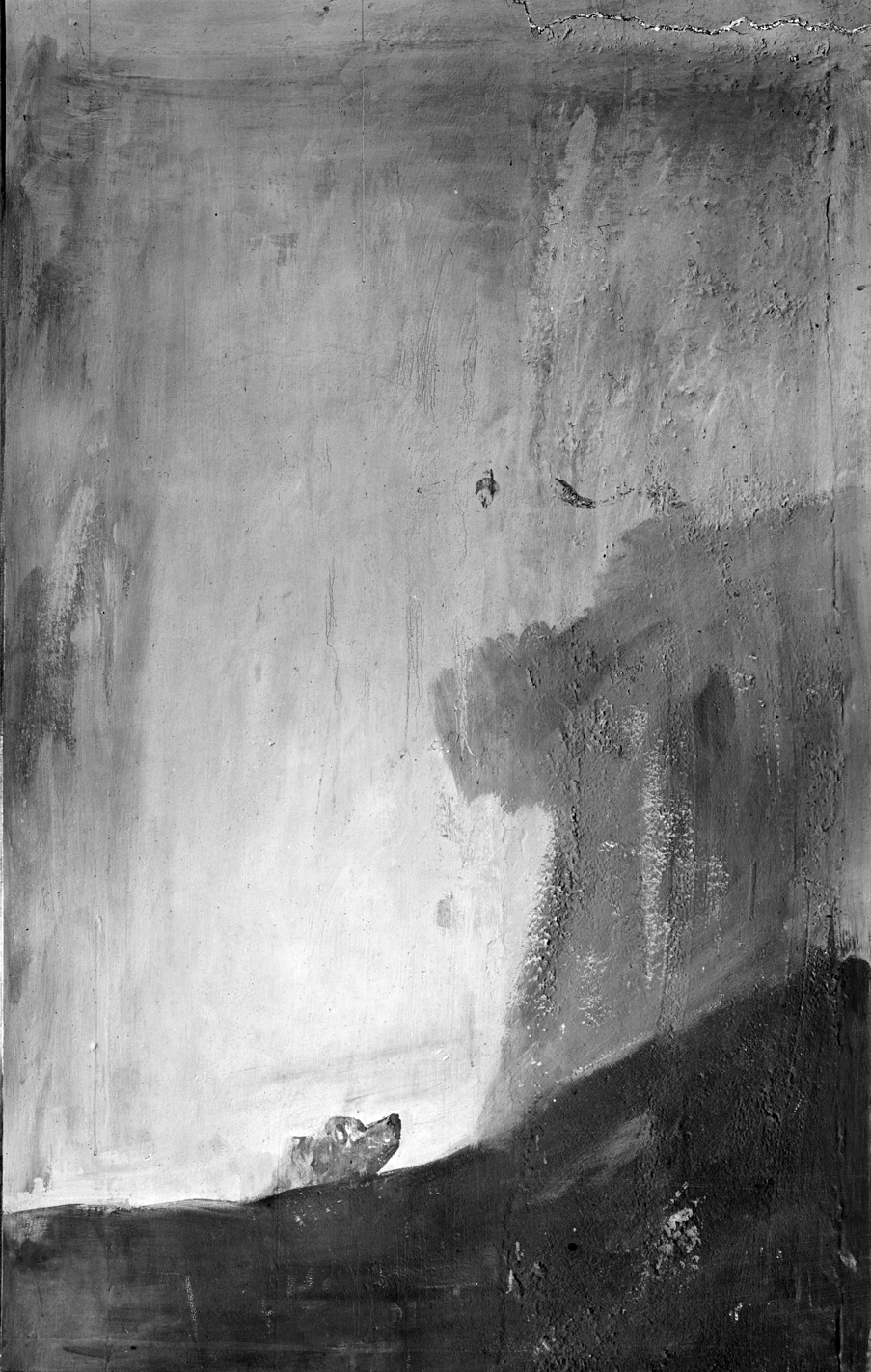
Photograph taken by Jean Laurent, c. 1874, depicting the painting prior to its removal from Quinta del Sordo. The dog is looking toward a rocky outcropping and figures appearing to be birds.

== Background ==
In 1819, Goya purchased a house named Quinta del Sordo (Villa of the Deaf Man) on the banks of the Manzanares near Madrid. It was a small two-story house which was named after a previous occupant who had been deaf, though Goya also happened to be functionally deaf, as a result of an illness he had contracted (probably lead poisoning) in 1792. Between 1819 and 1823, Goya produced a series of 14 works, which he painted with oils directly onto the walls of the house.

At the age of 73, and having survived two life-threatening illnesses, Goya was likely to have been concerned with his own mortality, and was increasingly embittered by the conflicts that had engulfed Spain in the decade preceding his move to the Quinta del Sordo, and the developing civil strife—indeed, Goya was completing the plates that formed his series The Disasters of War during this period. Although he initially decorated the rooms of the house with more inspiring images, in time he overpainted all of them with the intense, haunting pictures known today as the Black Paintings. Uncommissioned and never meant for public display, these pictures reflect his darkening mood with their depictions of intense scenes of malevolence, conflict, and despair.

If Goya gave titles to the works he produced at the Quinta del Sordo he never revealed what they were; the names by which they are now known were assigned by others after his death, and this painting is often identified by variations on the common title: A Dog, Head of a Dog, The Buried Dog, The Half-Drowned Dog, The Half-Submerged Dog; more colloquially as "Goya's Dog"; or by the Spanish names El Perro or Perro Semihundido.

== Painting ==
The painting is divided into two unequal sections: an upper, dirty ochre "sky" and a smaller sloping curved dark brown section which fades to black as it slopes up to the right. Over the top of this lower section the dog's head can be seen, its snout lifted, its ears pulled back and its eyes looking up and towards the right. A faint dark shape looms over the dog; this is sometimes considered to be damage or an intentional inclusion, but is generally seen as an artifact from the earlier painting that decorated the wall before Goya overpainted it with The Dog.

The enigmatic depiction of the dog has led to myriad interpretations of Goya's intentions. The painting is often seen as a symbolic depiction of man's futile struggle against malevolent forces; the black sloping mass which envelopes the dog is imagined to be quicksand, earth or some other material in which the dog has become buried. Having struggled unsuccessfully to free itself, it can now do nothing but look skywards hoping for a divine intervention that will never come. The vast swath of "sky" which makes up the bulk of the picture intensifies the feeling of the dog's isolation and the hopelessness of its situation. Others see the dog as cautiously raising its head above the black mass, afraid of something outside the painting's field of view, or perhaps an image of abandonment, loneliness and neglect. According to Robert Hughes, "We do not know what it means, but its pathos moves us on a level below narrative."

== Influence ==
Goya's influence is apparent in the dog in Pierre Bonnard's 1910 The Red-Checkered Tablecloth, but Bonnard's painting has a clear, cheerful theme, while Goya's work has a more ominous and mysterious meaning.

== Transfer from the Quinta del Sordo ==
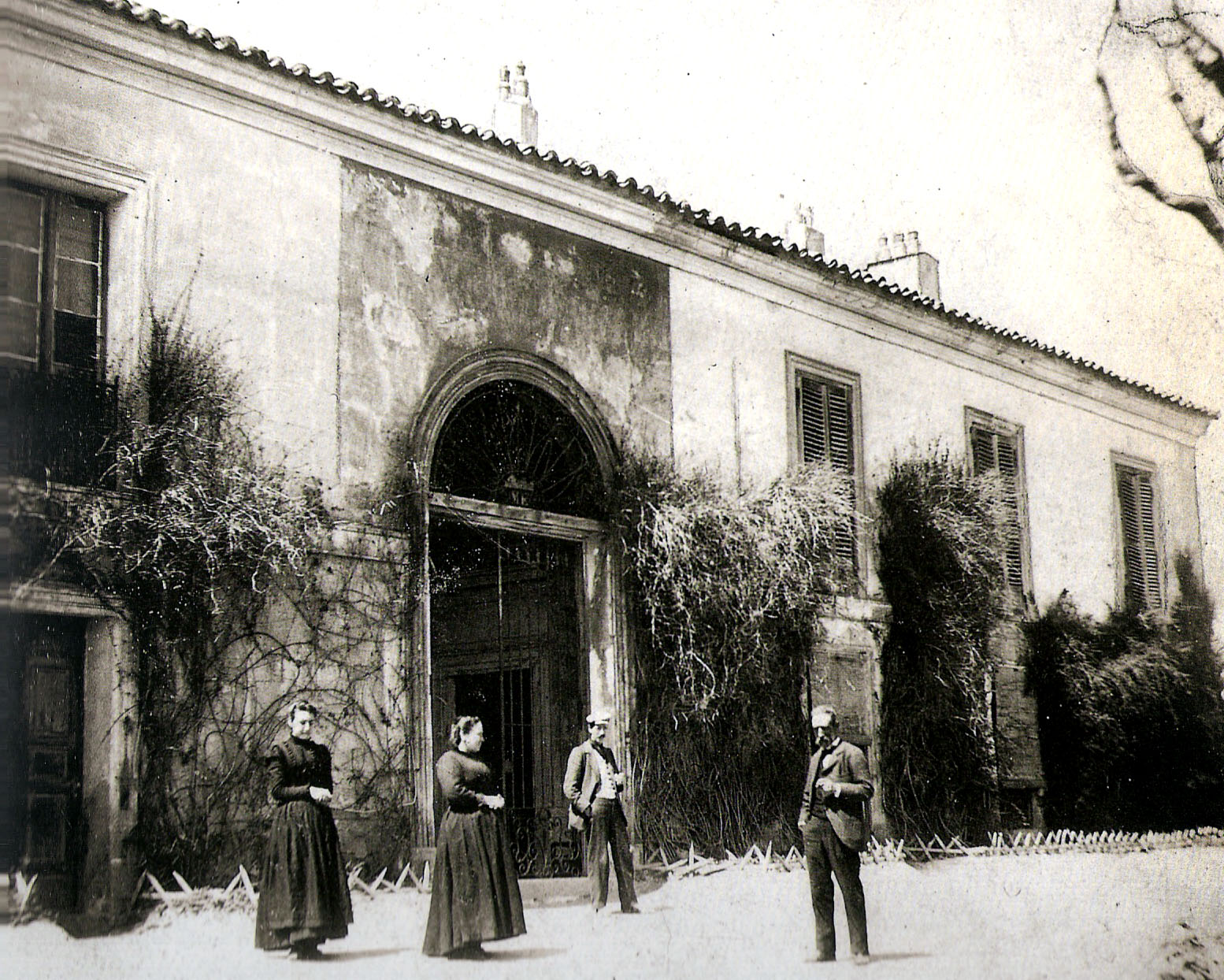
Quinta del Sordo, c. 1900

Although Goya did not intend the Black Paintings to be seen by the public, they are today seen as among his most important works. When Goya went into self-imposed exile in France in 1823, he passed the Quinta del Sordo to his grandson Mariano. After various changes of ownership, the house came into the possession of the French banker Baron Émile d'Erlanger in 1874. After fifty years on the walls of the Quinta del Sordo, the murals were deteriorating badly, and in order to preserve them, the new owner of the house had them transferred to canvas under the direction of Salvador Martínez Cubells, the curator of the Museo del Prado.

After showing them at the Exposition Universelle of 1878 in Paris, d'Erlanger eventually donated them to the Spanish state. The effects of time on the murals, coupled with the inevitable damage caused by the delicate operation of mounting the crumbling plaster on canvas, meant that most of the murals required restoration work and some detail may have been lost. The Dog appears not to have suffered too badly, though the faint dark shape in the upper right of the picture is sometimes considered to be damage. The Dog was on the second floor of the Quinta del Sordo, and in disputes over the provenance of the Black Paintings exchanges have focused on whether the villa possessed a second floor at the time of Goya's residence.

== Reception ==
Goya was long dead by the time the paintings were first exhibited publicly. Spanish painter Antonio Saura thought The Dog "the world's most beautiful picture", and his contemporary, Rafael Canogar referred to it as a "visual poem" and cited it as the first Symbolist painting of the Western world. Picasso was a great admirer of the Black Paintings (though he did not single out The Dog in particular), and Joan Miró requested to see two paintings on his final visit to the Prado: The Dog and Velázquez's Las Meninas, which he held in equal regard. Manuela Mena, curator at the Prado, said that "there is not a single contemporary painter in the world who does not pray in front of The Dog".

The opening line of Facing Goya, an opera by Michael Nyman and Victoria Hardie, is "Dogs drowning in sand," in direct reference to this painting.
