= Unfortunate events in the front seats of the ring of Madrid, and the death of the mayor of Torrejón =

Etching by Francisco de Goya

Unfortunate Events in the Front Seats of the Ring of Madrid, and the Death of the Mayor of Torrejón
- Desgracias acaecidas en el tendido de la plaza de Madrid, y muerte del alcalde de Torrejón (Spanish)
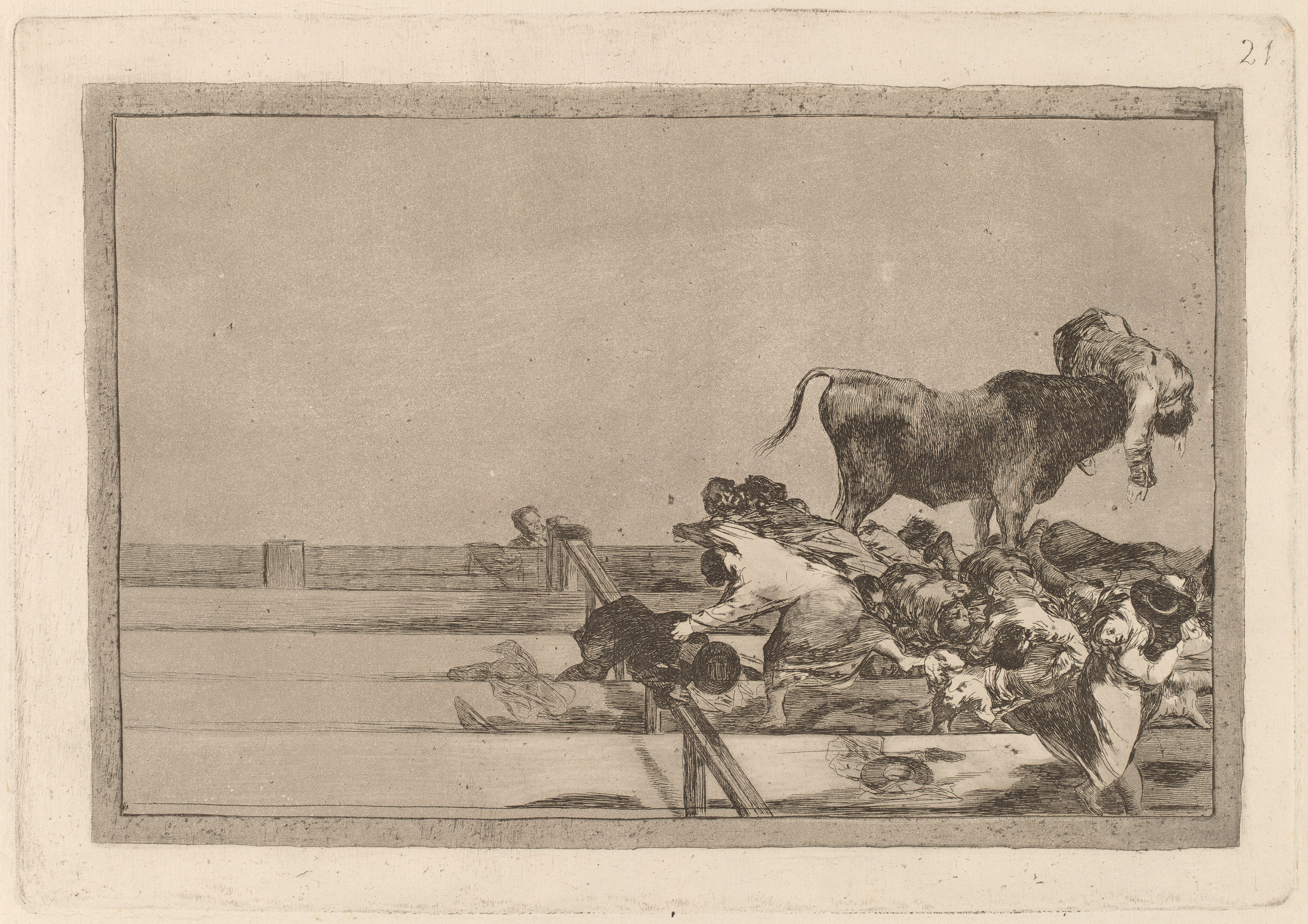
- Plate 21 of Goya's Tauromaquia series
- Artist: Francisco Goya
- Year: 1815–1816
- Medium: Etching
- Dimensions: 25.3 cm × 35.7 cm (10.0 in × 14.1 in)

Unfortunate Events in the Front Seats of the Ring of Madrid, and the Death of the Mayor of Torrejón (or Fatal Mishap in the Stands...) (Spanish: Desgracias Acaecidas en el Tendido de la Plaza de Madrid, y Muerte del Alcalde de Torrejón) is the name given to an etching with burnished aquatint, drypoint and burin on paper by the Spanish painter and printmaker Francisco Goya.

Unfortunate Events... is number 21 in a series of 35 etchings making up his Tauromaquia ("Art of Bullfighting") series, which he produced between 1815 and 1816. (Note: During the same period, he was completing his The Disasters of War engravings) The plate has been described by Robert Hughes as among the greatest of Goya's graphic output.

Throughout his life, Goya was a keen follower of bullfighting and boasted that he had taken on a bull in his youth.

== Description ==
The etching details an event from 15 June 1801 when a bull broke through barriers at a bullfight in Madrid, killing two people (including the mayor of Torrejón de Ardoz) and injuring a number of other spectators. The lifeless body of the mayor is seen impaled and hanging from the triumphant-looking animal's horns, while the second dead man is shown beneath the barrier in the middle-ground, mourned by a woman in white.

The action takes place entirely on the lower right side of the print, which is separated from the left and upper areas by rail and skyline. These areas are almost completely empty and devoid of detail; the composition rebels against traditional artistic conventions regarding balance and harmony. Three of the etching's quarters are completely still; the activity is contained entirely in the right foreground, where a jumbled and blurred mass of survivors are running left and right in panic to escape. None have crossed the handrail; the corpse of one victim lies straddled under the barrier between the two halves of the page.

The art historian John J. Ciofalo wrote, "the spectacle in the ring has infringed upon the normally protective barrier of the seating area and transformed the terrified spectators themselves into the new spectacle." A central beam serves as a dividing line, a frontier between calm and chaos. "The viewer's eye is led by this beam across the stadium seats to its ultimate destination: Goya, himself, the architect of this curiously arranged tableau...from there, the viewer's gaze follows Goya's, which is directed rightward, upward to the mayor's impaled corpse."

== Empty space ==
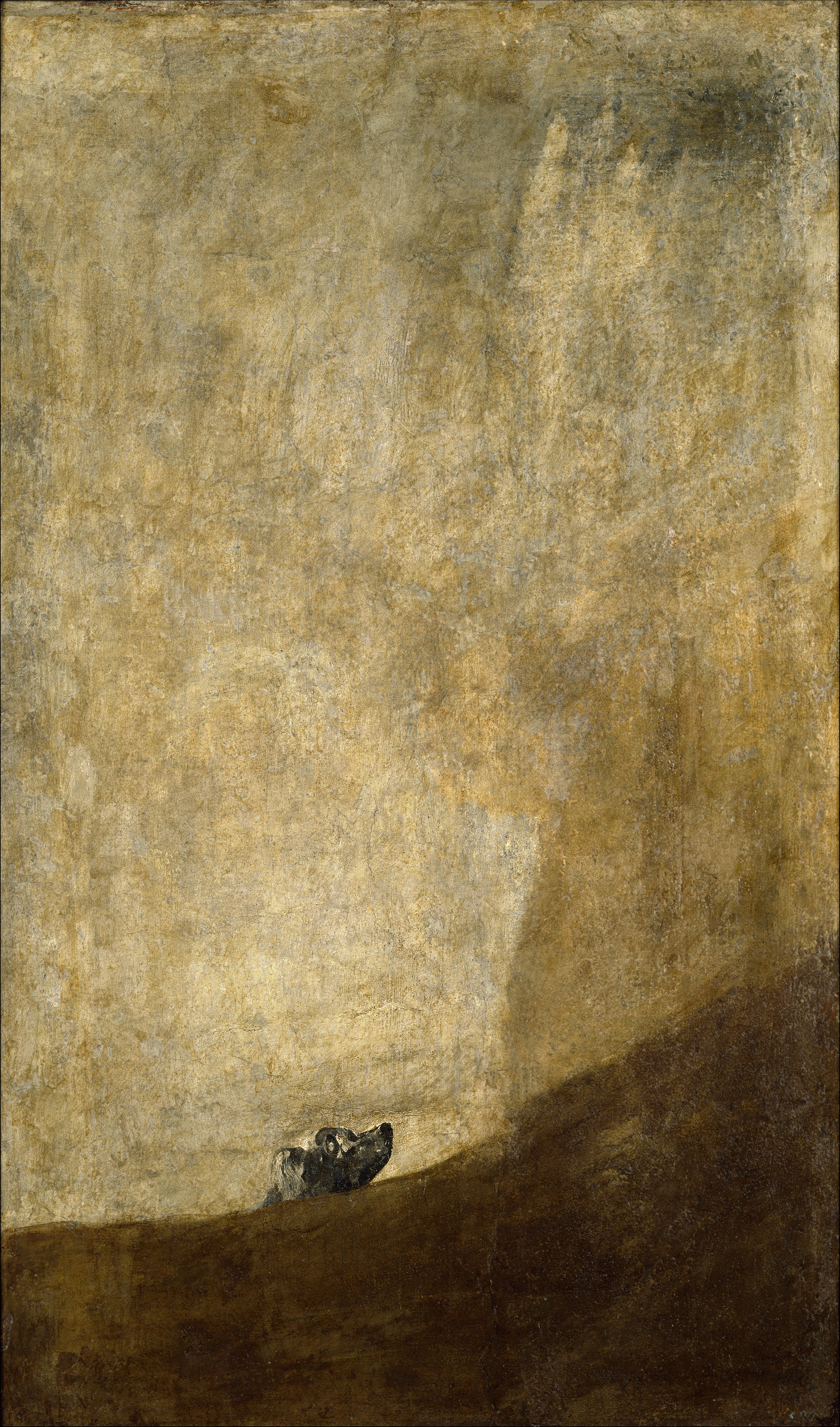
Goya's The Dog (1819–1823)

Goya's use of empty space has been described as an indication of how his work, of all the Old Masters, is closest to the spirit of Modernism. He was to use areas of empty space for dramatic and evocative effect again in his Black Paintings, notably in The Dog and The Great He-Goat. Hughes, writing on how Goya anticipates a number of the later ideas of European art, remarked in 2004 of the "naked power with which Goya has played off void against solid, black against light, empty space against full." The picture rewards detailed examination in that much of the subtleties are not at first obvious. For example, the late mayor's shoe can be seen in the distance protruding from the bull's neck, making the man all the more pathetic a figure against the force and strength of the animal. Another is the small black triangle of the bull's right horn, protruding from the mayor's back, evidence that he is not merely injured but is, in fact, mortally wounded or completely dead (the figure's other characteristics make clear that the body is quite lifeless).

== Sources ==
- Hagen, Rose-Marie & Hagen, Rainer. Francisco Goya, 1746–1828. Taschen, 2003. ISBN 3-8228-1823-2
- Hughes, Robert. Goya. New York: Alfred A. Knopf, 2004. ISBN 0-394-58028-1
