= Judith and Holofernes (Goya) =

Painting by Francisco de Goya

- Judith y Holofernes (Spanish)
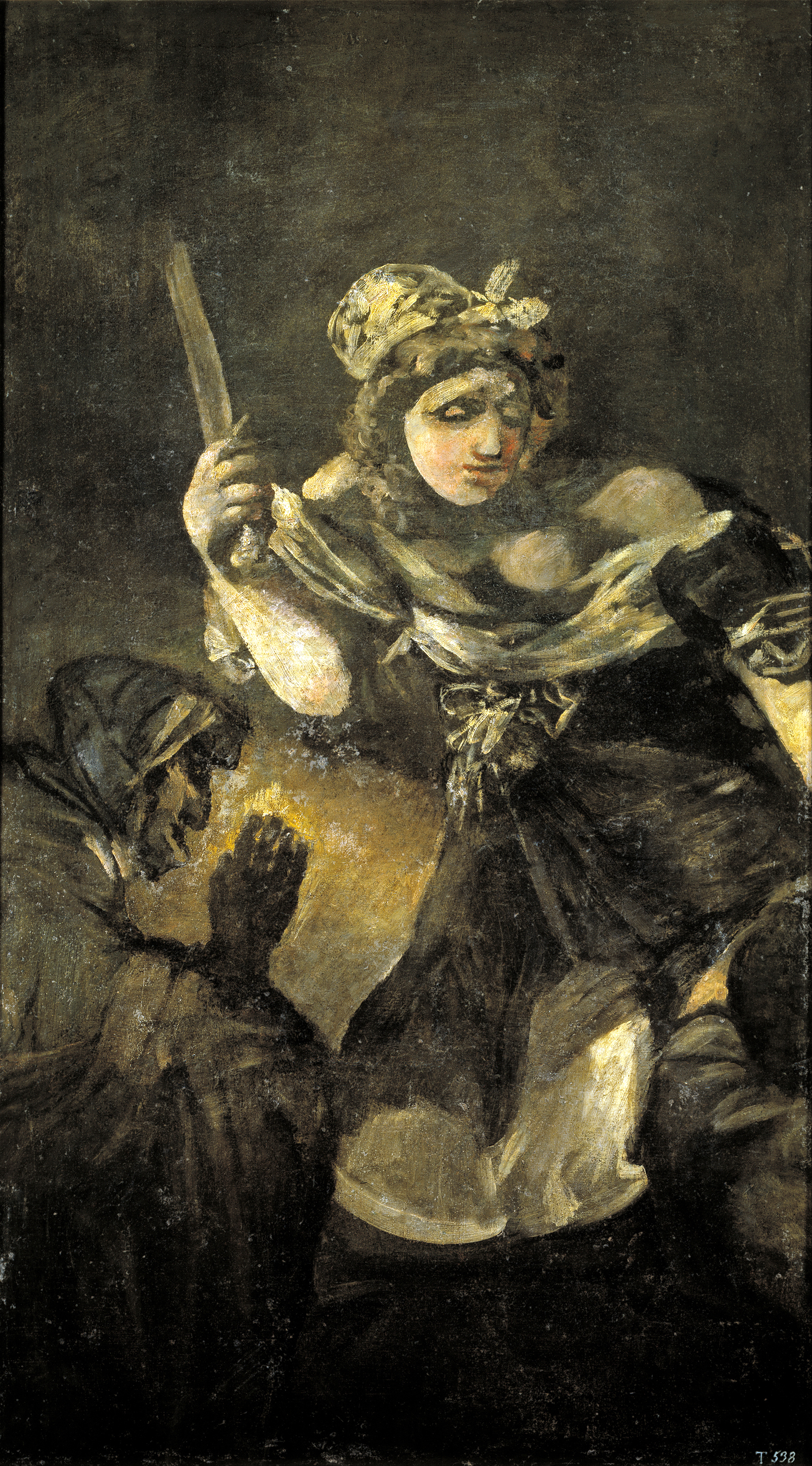
- Artist: Francisco de Goya
- Year: 1819–23
- Type: Oil mural transferred to canvas
- Dimensions: 143.5 cm × 81.4 cm (56.5 in × 32.0 in)
- Location: Museo del Prado; Madrid

Judith and Holofernes is the name given to one of the 14 Black Paintings painted by Francisco de Goya between 1819 and 1823. By this time, Goya was in his mid 70s and deeply disillusioned. In mental and physical despair, he painted the private works on the interior walls of his home—applying oils directly on plaster—known as the Quinta del Sordo ("The House of the Deaf Man"), which he had purchased in 1819. Judith and Holofernes was likely painted on the first floor, beside Saturn Devouring His Son. The picture is a personal reinterpretation of the narrative of the Book of Judith, in which the protagonist saves Israel from the assault of the general Holofernes by seducing and beheading him. Judith is the only historical figure who can be identified with certainty among the Black Paintings.

Judith and Holofernes' palette consists of blacks, ochres and red applied with very free, broad and energetic brushstrokes. The lighting is both focused and highly theatrical, and seems to imply a night scene lit by a torch, which illuminates Judith's face and outstretched arm and leaves in semidarkness the face of the old serving woman whose darkened outline is shown in prayer. Significantly, neither Holofernes nor the blood streaming from his neck is shown, as is typical of most artistic renderings.

Given Goya's bitter disillusionment over the second restoration of Ferdinand VII, it is possible that Holofernes represents the Spanish King, whom Goya privately despised. Holofernes' death was often depicted in art as a symbol of the defeat of tyranny. This would have been a brave and daring allusion for an artist with such ties to the crown as Goya had. Goya did not believe, however, that the series would ever be viewed by anyone but himself, which allowed him greater freedom of expression. He had been secretive before when delivering unpalatable political views through his work; his Disasters of War series of etchings harshly comments on both the Peninsular War and the later Bourbon Restoration, but was only published 35 years after his death.

Along with the other works in the series, the painting was transferred to canvas in 1873–74 for Baron Émile d'Erlanger under the supervision of Salvador Martínez Cubells, a curator at the Museo del Prado. D'Erlanger donated all 14 canvases to the Prado in 1881.

== See also ==
- List of works by Francisco Goya

== Bibliography ==
- Benito Oterino, Agustín, La luz en la quinta del sordo: estudio de las formas y cotidianidad, Madrid, Universidad Complutense, 2002, p. 33. Edición digital ISBN 84-669-1890-6.
- Bozal, Valeriano, Francisco Goya, vida y obra, (2 vols.) Madrid, Tf. Editores, 2005. ISBN 84-96209-39-3.
- Bozal, Valeriano, Pinturas Negras de Goya, Tf. Editores, Madrid, 1997.
- Glendinning, Nigel, Francisco de Goya, Madrid, Cuadernos de Historia 16 (col. «El arte y sus creadores», nº 30), 1993.
- Hagen, Rose-Marie and Hagen, Rainer, Francisco de Goya, Cologne, Taschen, 2003. ISBN 3-8228-2296-5.
- Hughes, Robert. Goya. New York: Alfred A. Knopf, 2004. ISBN 0-394-58028-1
