= Jean Laurent (photographer) =

French photographer

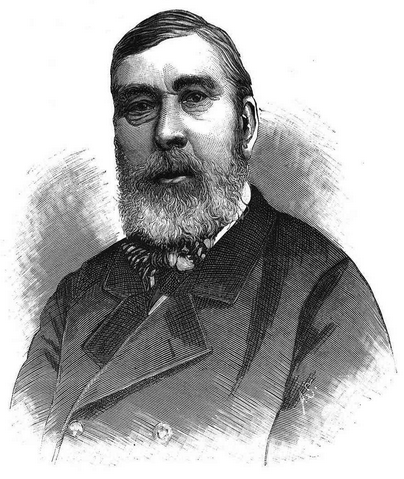
- Juan Laurent, from La Ilustración Nacional (1887)
- Born: 23 July 1816; Garchizy
- Died: 24 November 1886 (aged 70); Madrid
- Burial place: Cementerio de la Almudena
- Other name: Juan Laurent Minier
- Occupation: Photographer

Jean Laurent or, in Spanish, Juan Laurent Minier (23 July 1816, Garchizy – 24 November 1886, Madrid) was a French photographer who mostly worked in Spain.

== Biography ==
Laurent first moved to Spain in 1843, and settled in Madrid. Until 1855, he worked as a box and paper maker, creating luxurious boxes for pastries and marbled paper for book bindings. That year, he became interested in photography from having done work coloring photographs. The following year, he was able to open a studio on the Carrera de San Jerónimo, near the Congress of Deputies, the same location where the British photographer, Charles Clifford, had set up his first studio.

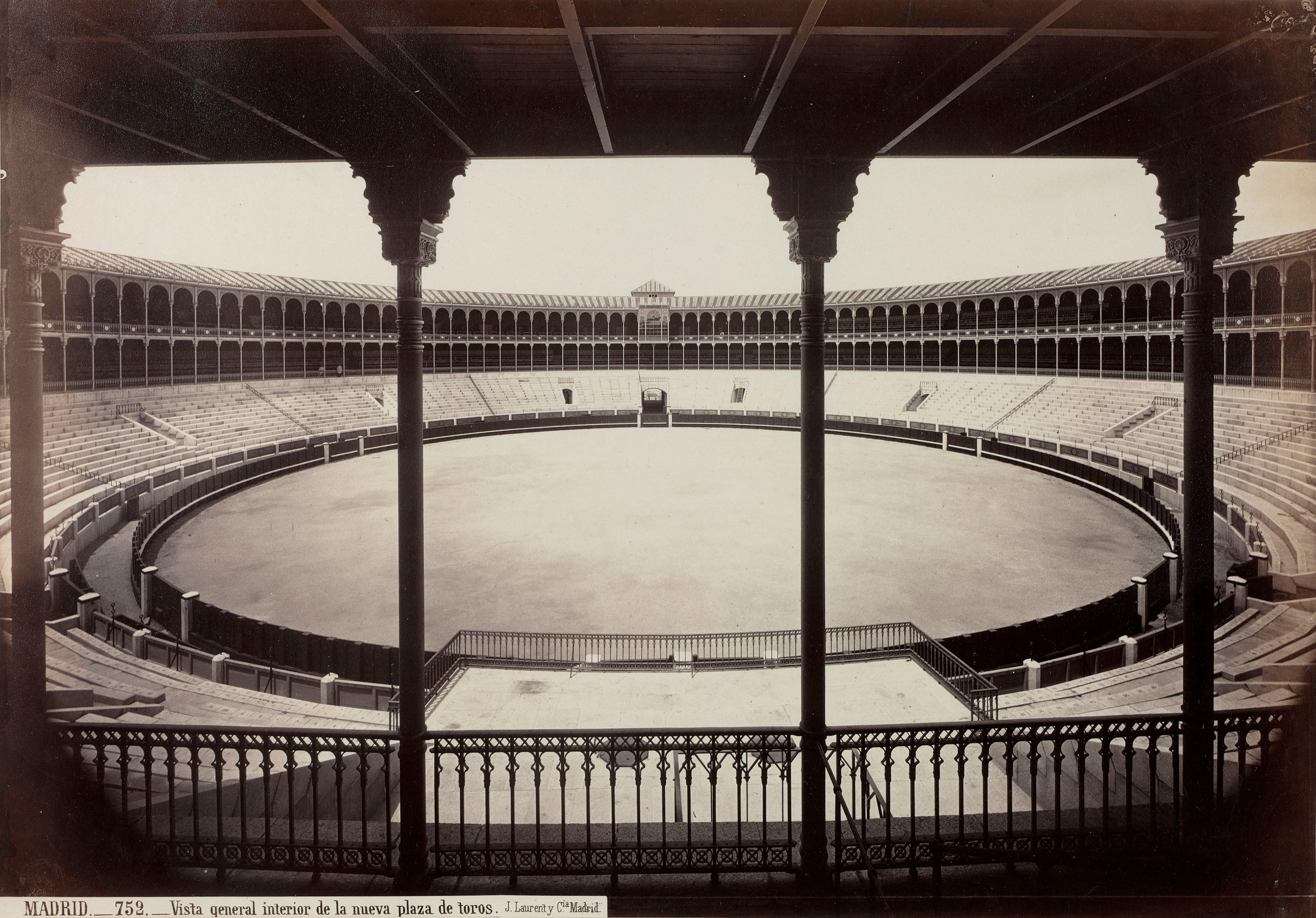
Madrid, Plaza de toros (1874)

In 1866, together with the Spanish photographer José Martínez Sánchez, he patented "Leptographic Paper" which produced positives, rather than the negatives produced by the albumen print process. The paper enjoyed some popularity in Spain and France, but was never widely used.

Laurent could boast of the title "Fotógrafo de Su Majestad la Reina" (Her Majesty The Queen's Photographer) from 1861 to 1868. That same year, he opened a store in Paris, devoted exclusively to selling his photographs of Spain and Portugal. One unusual product produced by his company were fans printed with photographs (especially bullfighting scenes) that would unfold like a mosaic.

In 1874, he was commissioned by Baron Émile d’Erlanger to take photographs of Francisco de Goya's Black Paintings at the Quinta del Sordo. The photographs were later used as a guide by the artist, Salvador Martínez Cubells, to remove the paintings and restore them for public display. This led to Laurent becoming the official photographer for the Museo del Prado, in 1879.

Laurent's son-in-law, Alfonso Roswag Nogier (1833–1900), became his principal partner and carried on the firm's business after Laurent's retirement in 1881. He was buried at Cementerio de la Almudena. After his death, the archive was acquired by the French photographer Joseph Jean Marie Lacoste Borde. When he was called to serve in the war in 1915, the collection was purchased by Joana Roig Villalonga, a Mallorcan, who continued to issue images under the name Casa Laurent until the archive was bought again, this time by another photographer, Joaquín Ruiz Vernacci, in 1930.

After his death in 1975, the collection was acquired by the Spanish government. The Spanish Cultural Heritage Institute has archived over 12,000 images created by Laurent and his company. The National Gallery of Art, Washington, D.C. houses a collection of nearly 700 albumen prints made from Jean Laurent's photographs, many of which have been digitized.

== Gallery of images ==
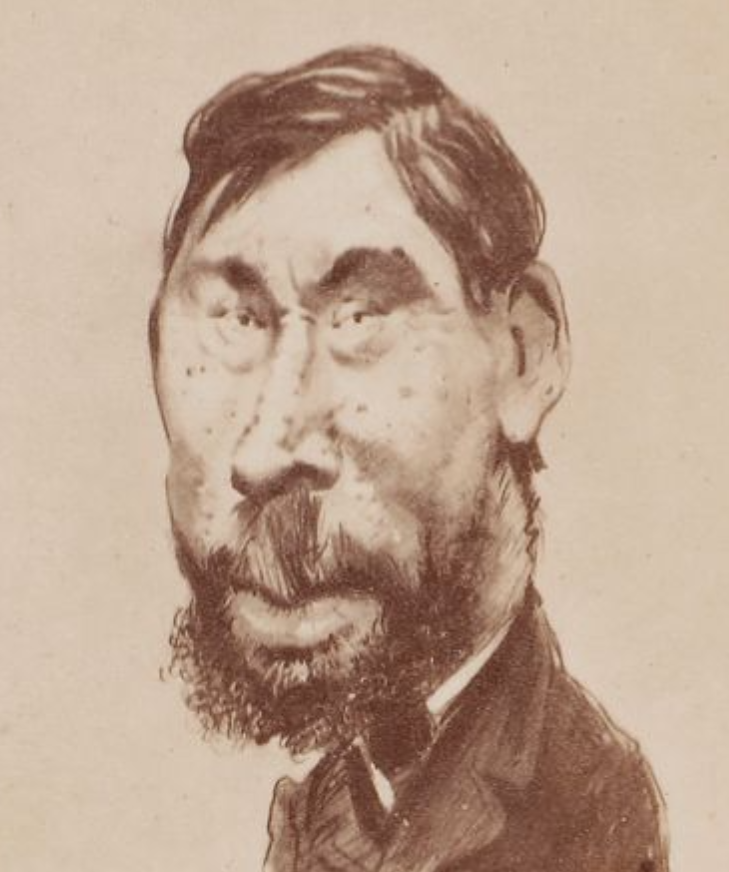
Caricature of Laurent (1862)

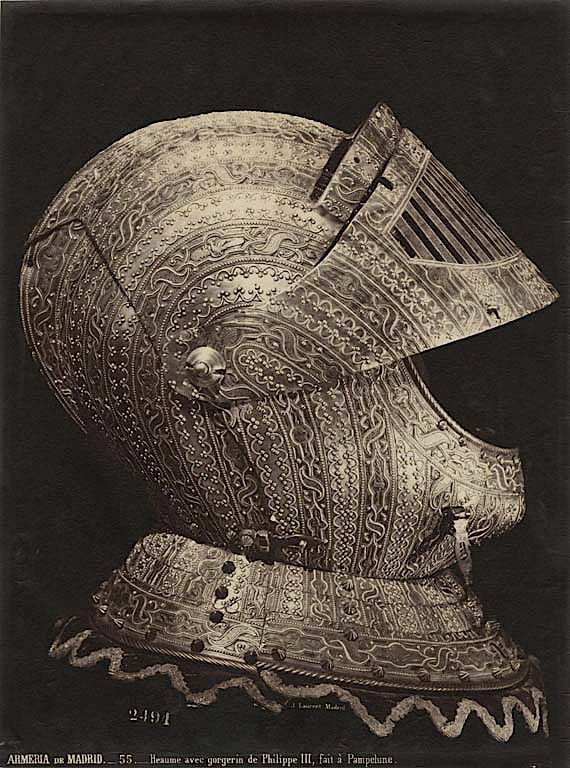
Helmet with Gorget of Philip III, Made in Pamplona, albumen photograph by Juan Laurent, 1863–1868

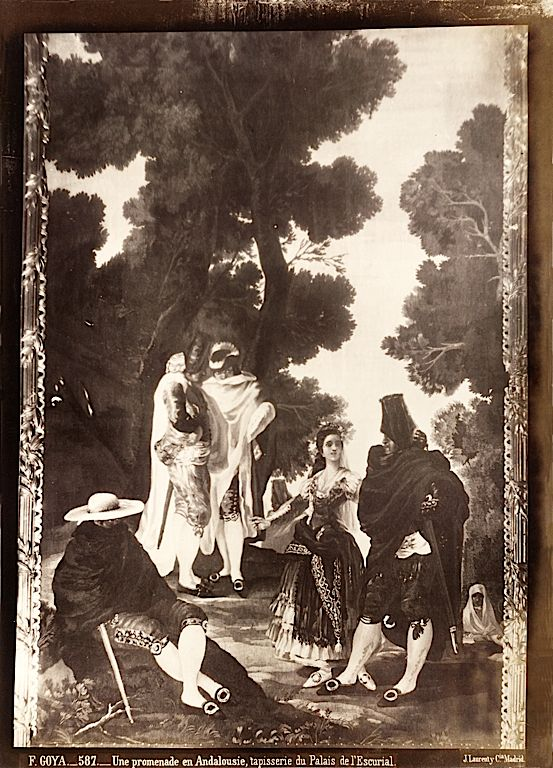
A Walk in Andalusia (tapestry after cartoon by Francisco de Goya), albumen photograph by Juan Laurent, 1875–1879

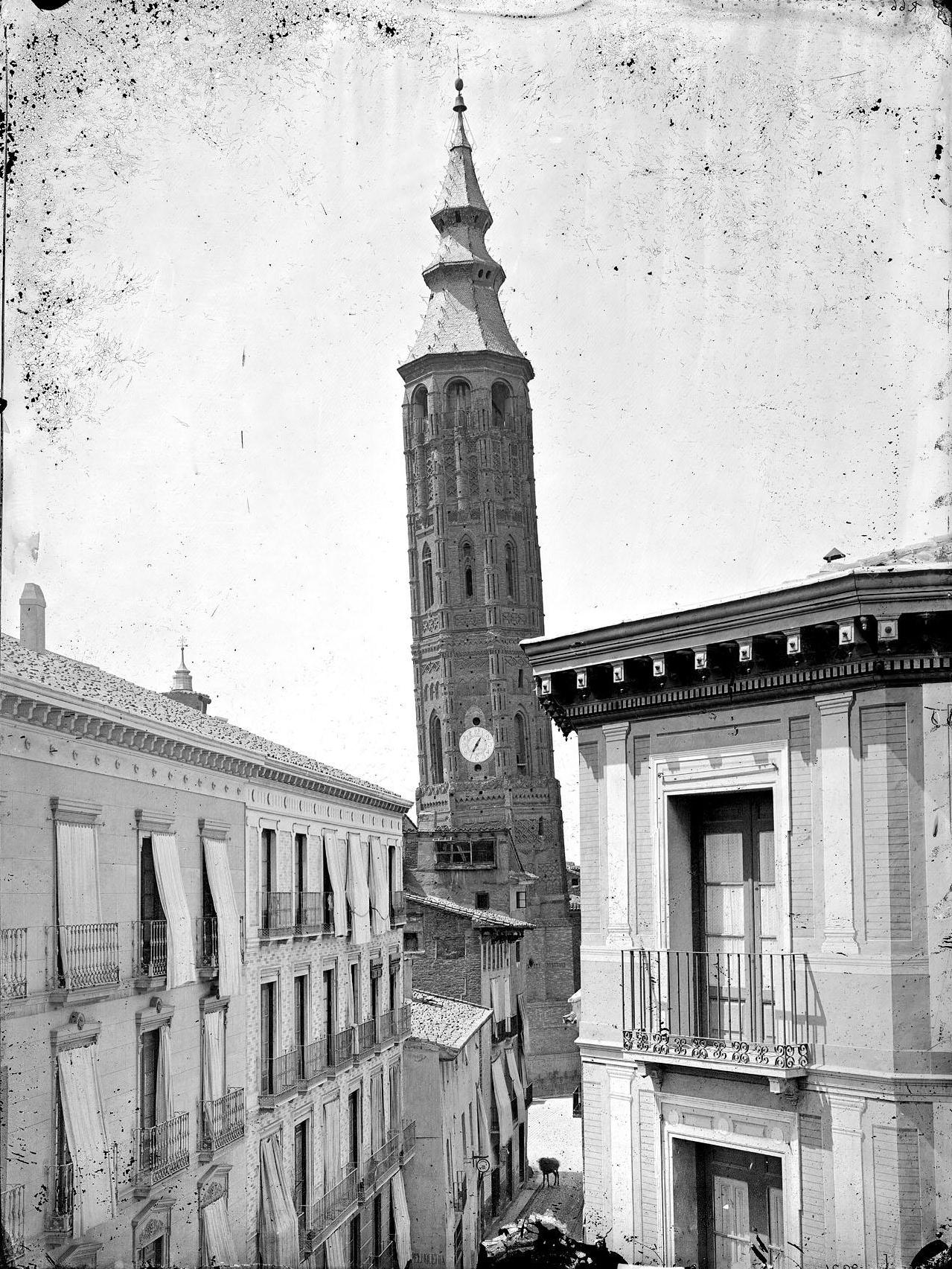
Zaragoza, Torre Nueva (c. 1875). This tower was demolished in 1892–1893. It was a clock tower, built of brick in the Mudéjar style in the early sixteenth century

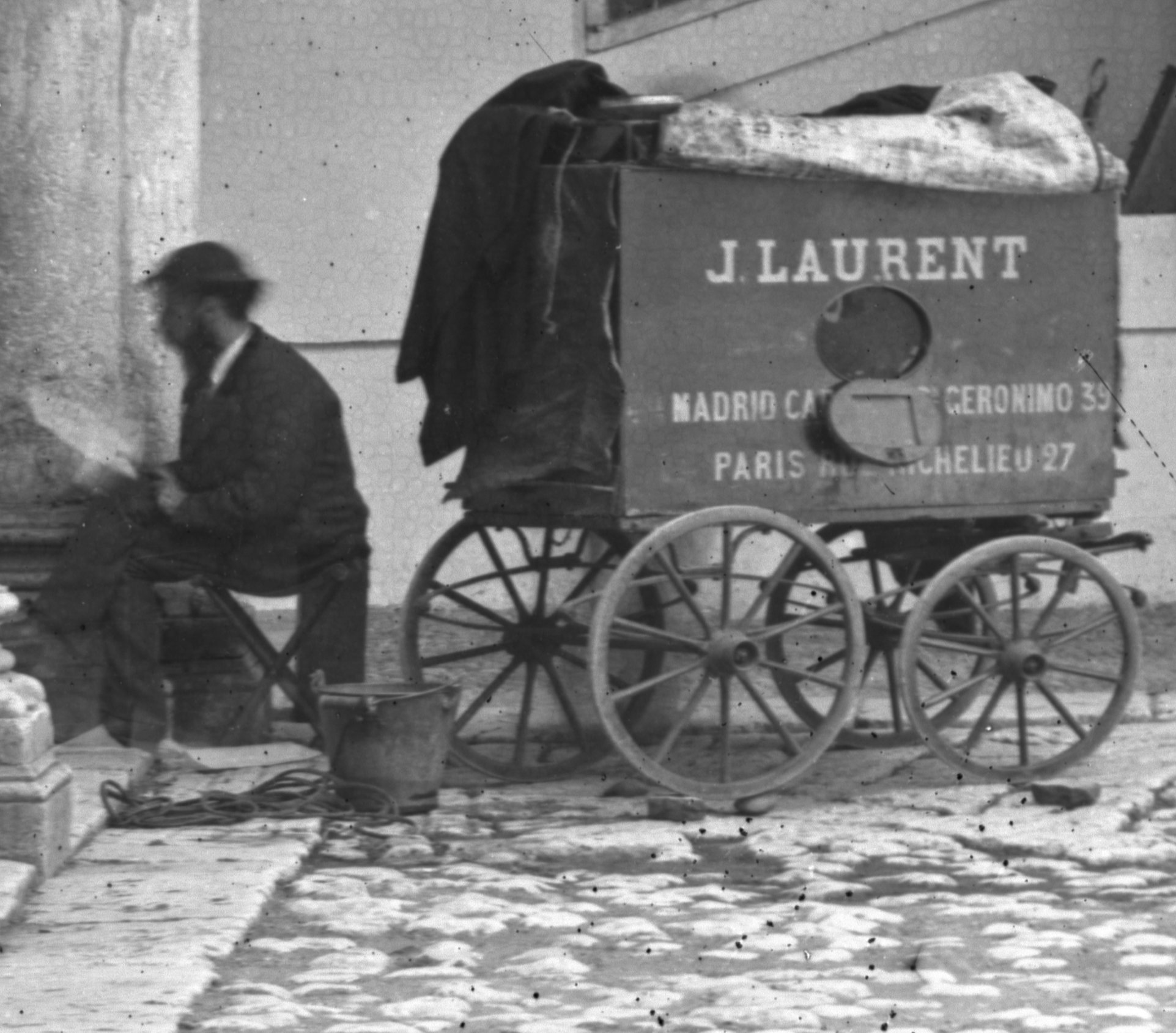
Carriage laboratory by J. Laurent, in Valladolid, Spain, in the year 1872. Fototeca del Instituto del Patrimonio Cultural de España.

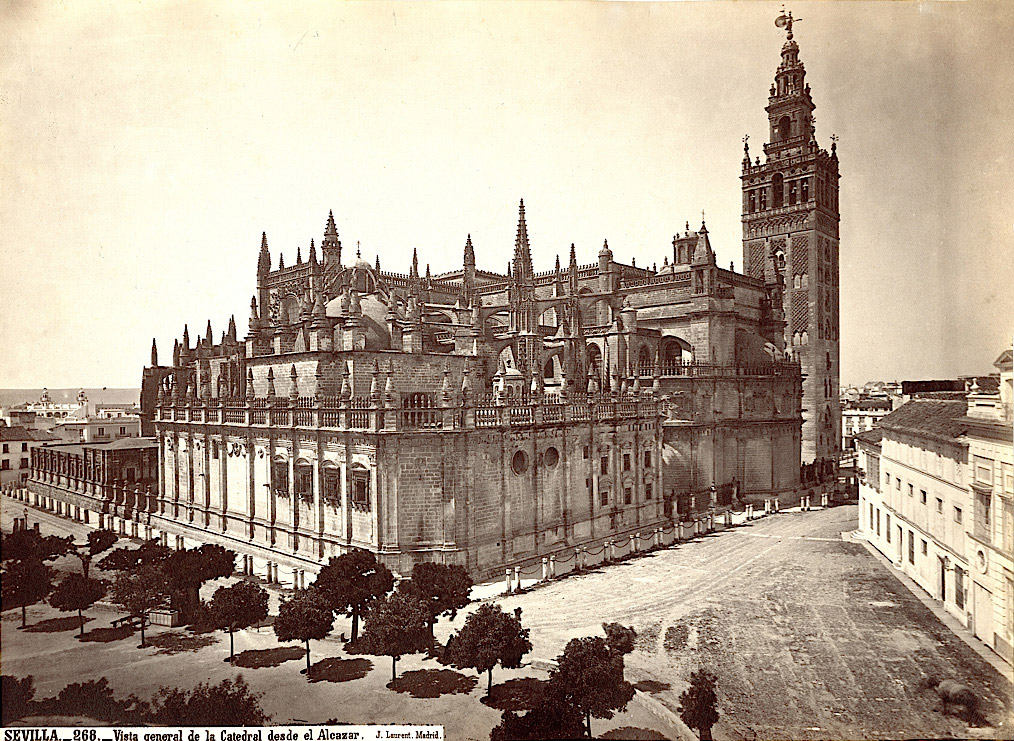
Sevilla Cathedral by Juan Laurent, c. 1866, Department of Image Collections, National Gallery of Art Library, Washington, DC

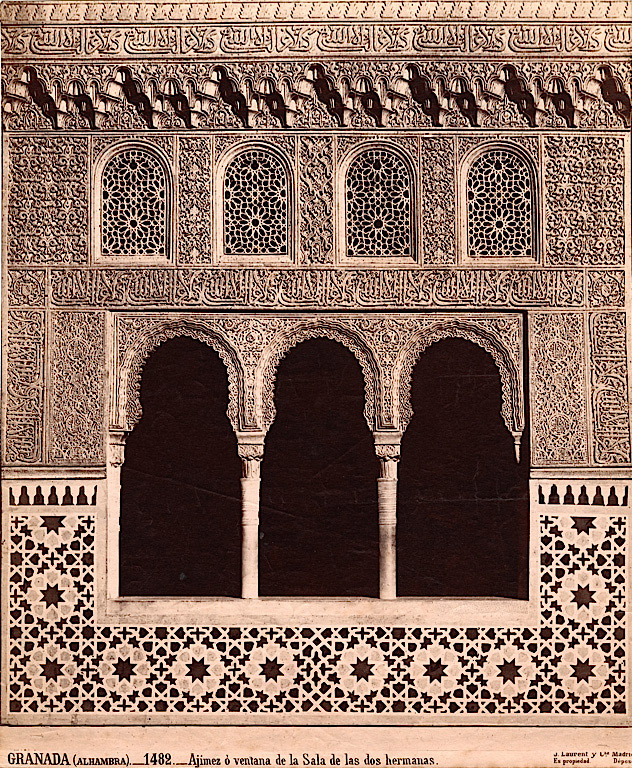
Mullioned windows of the Hall of the Two Sisters, Alhambra, Granada by Juan Laurent, c. 1874, Department of Image Collections, National Gallery of Art Library, Washington, DC

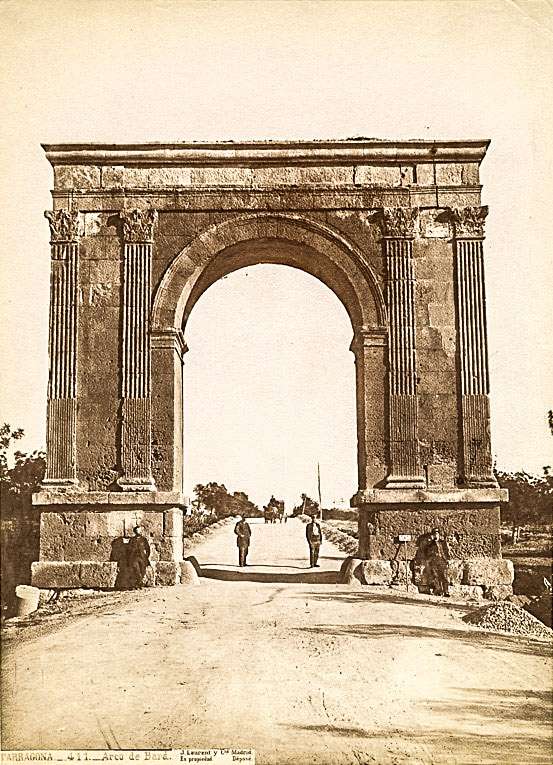
Arc de Berà, Tarragona, Spain, photograph by Juan Laurent, 1866-1867, Department of Image Collections, National Gallery of Art Library, Washington, DC

== Exhibition Catalogues ==
- Las fotografías valencianas de J. Laurent. Valencia, Ayuntamiento de Valencia, 2003. ISBN 84-8484-069-7
- Jean Laurent en el Museo Municipal de Madrid. Retratos. Artistas plásticos, cat. Purificación Nájera Colino. Madrid, Museo Municipal de Madrid, 2005. Tomo I. ISBN 84-7812-591-4.
- La Casa Laurent y Guadalajara. Fotografías, 1862–1902. Guadalajara, Diputación Provincial, 2007. ISBN 978-84-87791-90-1
- La Andalucía del siglo XIX en las fotografías de J. Laurent y Cía.. Almería, Junta de Andalucía, 1999. ISBN 84-8266-024-1
- Un fotógrafo francés en la España del siglo XIX: J. Laurent: Un photographe français dans l'Espagne du XIXème siècle. Madrid, Ministerio de Educación y Cultura, Caja de Madrid, 1996. ISBN 84-922135-0-7
- J. Laurent y Cía en Aragón. Fotografías, 1861–1877. Zaragoza, Diputación Provincial de Zaragoza, 1997. ISBN 84-89721-13-0
- Obras Públicas de España. Fotografías de J. Laurent, 1858–1870. Ciudad Real, Universidad de Castilla-La Mancha, 2003. ISBN 84-8427-286-9

== Collections ==
- The Solemnity of Shadows: Juan Laurent’s Vision of Spain Honoring Juan Laurent on His 200th Birthday (2016)
- Laurent & Co. a history @ the Museo del Prado
- Works by Laurent @ the Institut Nationale d'Histoire de l'Art. (INHA)
- Works by Laurent @ the Biblioteca Digital Hispánica
- Works by Laurent @ the Instituto del Patrimonio Cultural de España (IPCE)
- Toledo en las Fotografías de J.Laurent by Carlos Magariños Laguía (Masters Thesis)
- Álbum de Toledo (1865), Archivo Municipal
