= Saturn Devouring His Son =

Painting by Francisco Goya (c. 1820–1823)

- Saturno devorando a su hijo (Spanish)
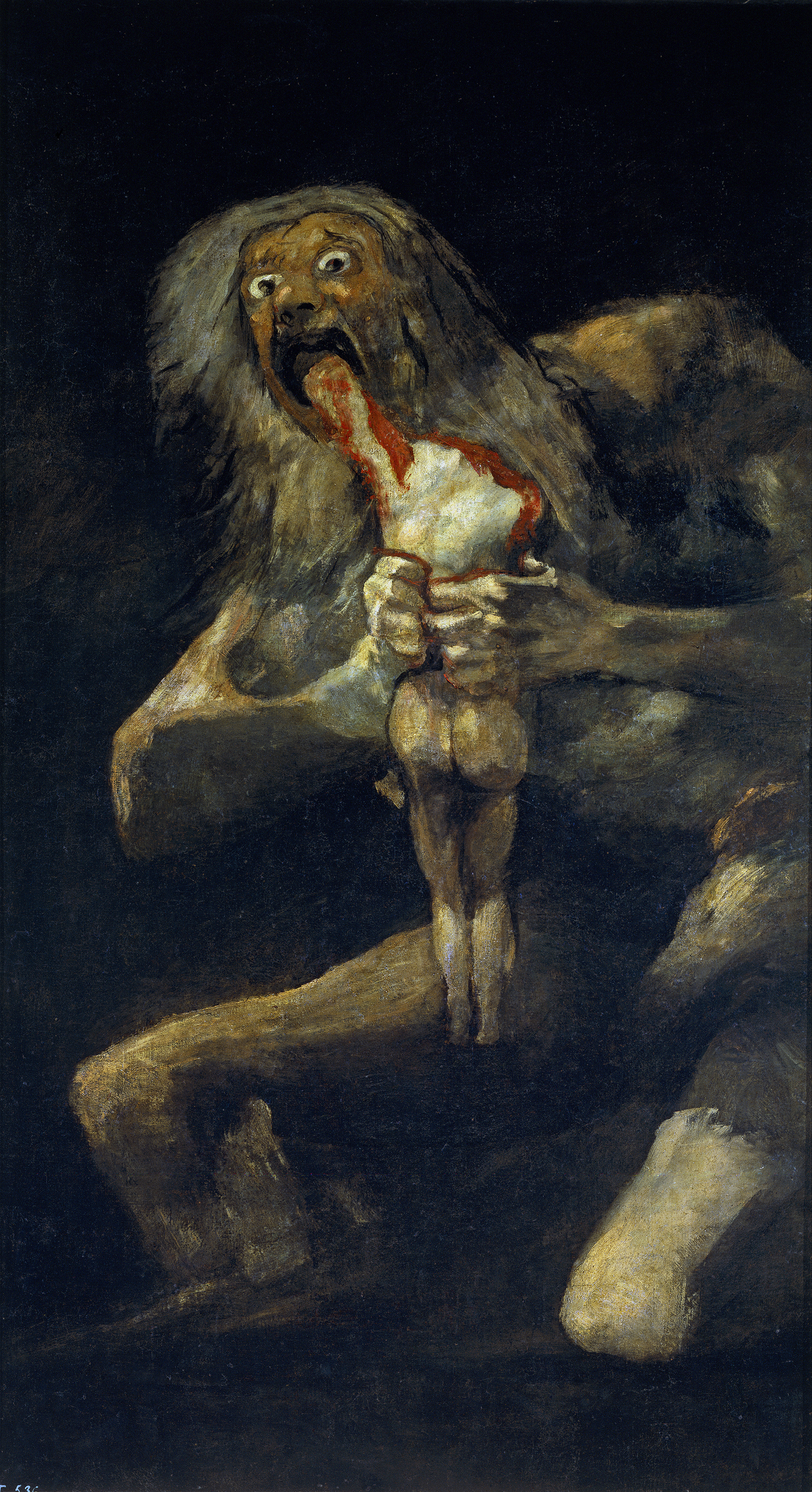
- Artist: Francisco Goya
- Year: c. 1820–1823
- Medium: Mixed media mural transferred to canvas
- Movement: Romanticism
- Dimensions: 143.5 cm × 81.4 cm (56.5 in × 32.0 in)
- Location: Museo del Prado, Madrid

Saturn Devouring His Son (Spanish: Saturno devorando a su hijo; also known as Saturn) is a painting by Spanish artist Francisco Goya. The work is one of the 14 so-called Black Paintings that Goya painted directly on the walls of his house some time between 1820 and 1823. It was transferred to canvas after Goya's death and is now in the Museo del Prado in Madrid.

The painting is traditionally considered a depiction of the Greek myth of the Titan Cronus, whom the Romans called Saturn, eating one of his children out of fear of a prophecy by Terra (Gaia) that one of his children would overthrow him. (Note: "These great Cronos swallowed as each came forth from the womb to his mother's knees with this intent, that no other of the proud sons of Heaven should hold the kingly office amongst the deathless gods. For he learned from Earth and starry Heaven that he was destined to be overcome by his own son, strong though he was, through the contriving of great Zeus.") Like all of the Black Paintings, it was not originally intended for public consumption and Goya did not provide a title or notes. Thus, its interpretation is disputed.

== Background ==
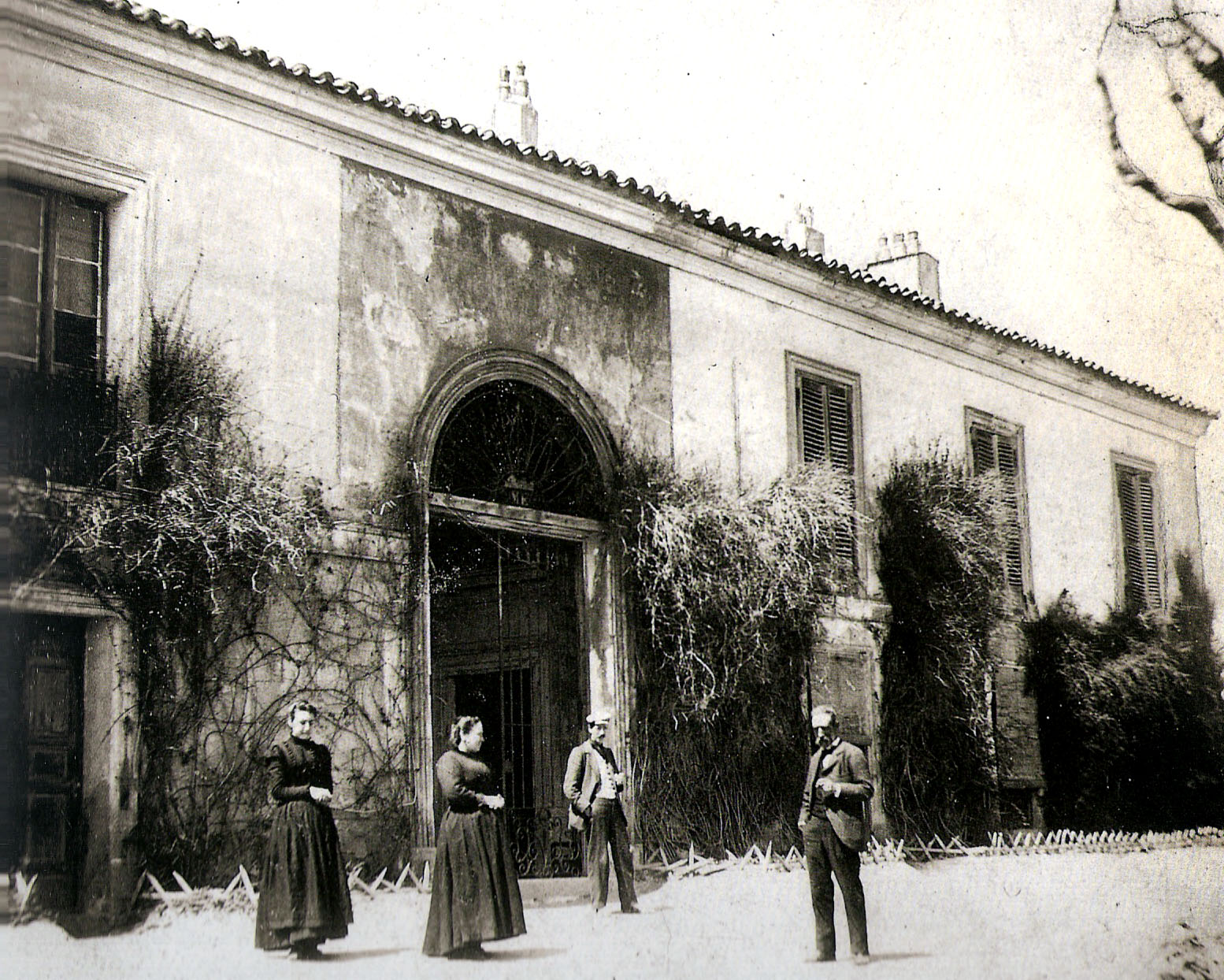
Quinta del Sordo, c. 1900

In 1819, Goya purchased a house on the banks of Manzanares near Madrid called Quinta del Sordo (Villa of the Deaf Man). It was a two-story house which was named after a previous occupant who had been deaf, although the name was fitting for Goya too, who had been left deaf after contracting a fever in 1792. Between 1819 and 1823, when he left the house to move to Bordeaux, Goya produced a series of 14 paintings using mixed technique on the walls of the house.

Although he initially decorated the rooms of the house with more inspiring images, in time he painted over them all with the intensely haunting pictures known today as the Black Paintings. Created without commission for private display, these paintings have been theorized to reflect the artist's state of mind late in a life that witnessed the violence of war and terror stoked by the Spanish Inquisition. (Note: "But never before and never since, as far as we know, has a major, ambitious cycle of paintings been painted with the intention of keeping the pictures an entirely private affair.")

Saturn Devouring His Son was one of six works Goya painted in the dining room. Goya never named the works he produced at Quinta del Sordo; the names were assigned by others after his death. This interpretation of the painting sees it as a reference to the Roman myth (inspired by the original Greek myth), in which Terra (Gaia) foretold that one of the sons of Saturn (Cronus) would overthrow him, just as he had overthrown his father, Caelus (Uranus). To prevent this, Saturn ate his children moments after each was born, eating the gods Vesta (Hestia), Ceres (Demeter), Juno (Hera), Pluto (Hades), and Neptune (Poseidon). His wife Ops (Rhea) eventually hid his sixth child and third son, Jupiter (Zeus), on the island of Crete, deceiving Saturn by offering a stone wrapped in swaddling in his place. Unlike the painting, the myths usually portray Saturn/Cronus swallowing his children whole, and later vomiting them up alive after swallowing the stone, rather than violently tearing them apart as in the painting. (Note: "After that, the strength and glorious limbs of the prince increased quickly, and as the years rolled on, great Cronos the wily was beguiled by the deep suggestions of Earth, and brought up again his offspring, vanquished by the arts and might of his own son, and he vomited up first the stone which he had swallowed last.") Jupiter eventually supplanted his father just as the prophecy had predicted.

== Composition and interpretations ==
Goya depicts a large figure feasting on a human form. The human head and part of the left arm have already been consumed. The right arm has probably been eaten too, though it could be folded in front of the body and held in place by the larger figure's thumbs. The larger figure is on the point of taking another bite from the left arm; as he looms from the darkness, his mouth gapes and his eyes bulge widely. The only other brightness in the picture comes from the white flesh, the red blood of the corpse, and the white knuckles of the larger figure as he digs his fingers into the back of the body.

Various interpretations of the meaning of the picture have been offered: the conflict between youth and old age, time as the devourer of all things, the wrath of God and an allegory of the situation in Spain, where the fatherland consumed its children in wars and revolution. There have been explanations rooted in Goya's relationships with his son Javier, the only of his six children to survive to adulthood, or with his live-in housekeeper and possible mistress, Leocadia Zorrilla; the sex of the body being consumed cannot be determined with certainty. If Goya made any notes on the picture, they did not survive, as he never intended the picture for public exhibition.

The mood of the painting is in stark contrast to Rubens' Saturn, as the central figure is acting out of madness rather than calculating reason, and the consumed figure is completely lifeless rather than in clear pain. Goya had likely seen Rubens' Saturn in his life, but the degree to which inspiration was taken (if any) is unknown.

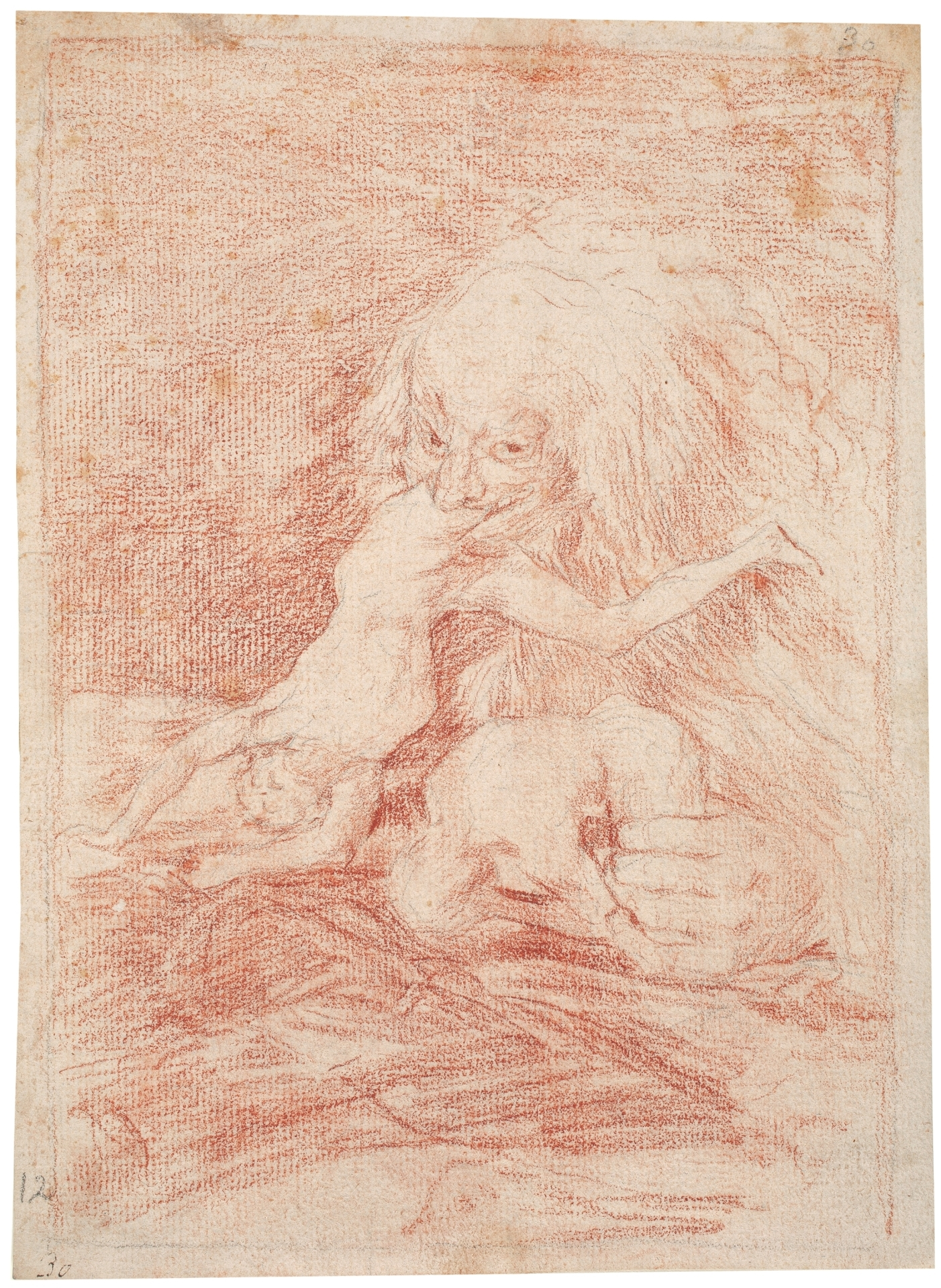
Saturn devouring his sons, Goya, c. 1797, red chalk on laid paper

Goya made a chalk drawing of the same subject in 1796–97: it showed a figure biting on the leg of one person while he holds another to eat, with none of the gore or madness of the later work.

Goya scholar Fred Licht has raised doubts regarding the traditional title, stating that it may "very well be misleading." He notes that the traditional iconographical attributes associated with Saturn (such as his scythe or hourglass) are absent from the painting, and the body of the smaller figure does not resemble that of an infant, or even truly an anatomically accurate human at all. He states that much like the other Black Paintings, "one must take the title with a grain of salt." Licht offers the alternative explanation that the painting is an inversion of antisemitic artistic depictions of Jewish figures eating children, a reference to the alleged blood libel. In this view, the larger figure represents the fears of Jews manifesting in real violence against them, as "real bestiality is born of imagined bestiality," although he concedes this is impossible to prove, and like the Saturn interpretation, demonstrates the varied intent of Goya in the composition. Additionally, he argues that the very act of naming the Black Paintings is an attempt to impose rationale on pictures which force one to contemplate chaos and nothingness, a primary theme in the Black Paintings.

It has been questioned whether the consumed figure is male. The art historian John J. Ciofalo writes that "the victim appears to be an adult and, given the curvaceous buttocks and legs, a female. Moreover, in other versions, the sons are alive and struggling or at least have heads, so the viewer can identify or sympathize. The victim is not struggling in Saturn's vice-like, blood-oozing grip, which literally cuts into her body, because she is already dead, not to mention headless. She does not, to say the least, encourage identification. The identification here flows toward Saturn. The overwhelming feeling of the image is one of violent and insatiable lust, underscored, to put it mildly, by the livid and enormously engorged penis between his legs. Utter male fury has hardly before or since been captured so vividly."

== Transfer from the Quinta del Sordo ==
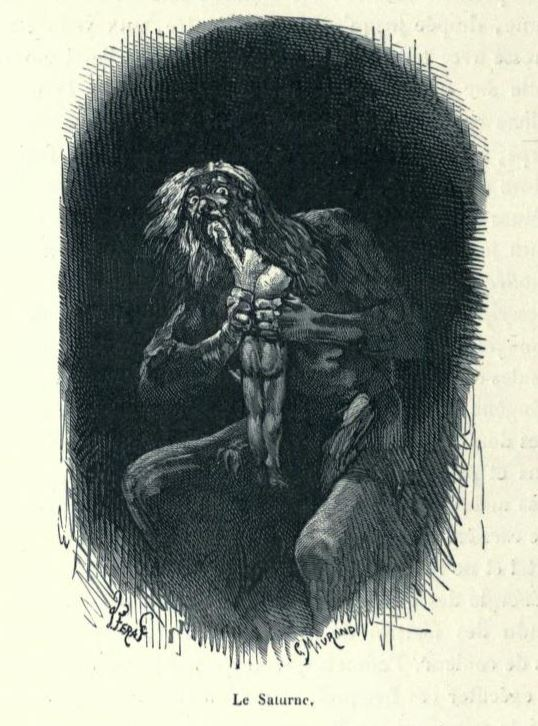
1867 print made of Goya's Saturn prior to restoration and transfer on to canvas. Note that some details not present in the current painting are visible

When Goya went into self-imposed exile in France in 1823, he passed the Quinta del Sordo to his grandson Mariano. After various changes of ownership, the house came into the possession of the French Baron Émile d'Erlanger in 1874. After fifty years on the walls of the Quinta del Sordo, the murals were deteriorating badly, and in order to preserve them, the new owner of the house had them transferred to canvas under the direction of Salvador Martínez Cubells, the chief art restorer at the Museo del Prado. After showing them at the Exposition Universelle of 1878 in Paris, d'Erlanger eventually donated them to the Spanish state. The effects of time on the murals, coupled with the inevitable damage caused by the delicate operation of mounting the crumbling plaster on canvas, meant that most of the murals required restoration work and some detail may have been lost. In particular, it has been claimed that the mural originally depicted Saturn with an erect penis, and that this detail was removed on the request of Cubells' client, Frédéric Émile d'Erlanger.

== See also ==
- Child cannibalism
- Infanticide
- List of works by Francisco Goya

== Bibliography ==
- Boime, Albert (2004). Art in an Age of Counterrevolution, 1815-1848. University of Chicago Press. ISBN 978-0-226-06337-9.
- Ciofalo, John J. (2001). The Self-Portraits of Francisco Goya. Cambridge: Cambridge University Press. ISBN 0-521-77136-6. OCLC 43561897.
- Connell, Evan (2004). Francisco Goya: A Life. Counterpoint. ISBN 978-1-58243-307-3.
- Glendinning, Nigel (1975). "The Strange Translation of Goya's 'Black Paintings.'". The Burlington Magazine. 117 (868): 465–79. JSTOR 878077.
- Hughes, Robert (2004). Goya. Vintage. ISBN 978-0-09-945368-0.
- Licht, Fred (1983). Goya: The Origins of the Modern Temper in Art. Icon. ISBN 0-06-430123-0.
- Morden, Karen & Pulimood, Stephen (2006). Stephen Farthing (ed.). 1001 Paintings You Must See Before You Die. London: Quintet Publishing Ltd. ISBN 1-84403-563-8.
- Morgan, Jay Scott. "The Mystery of Goya's Saturn". New England Review. Archived from the original on 13 December 2006.
- Olszewski, Edward (2008). "Goya's Ambitious Saturn". In Chu, Petra ten-Doesschate; Dixon, Laurinda (eds.). Twenty-First Century Perspectives on Nineteenth-Century Art. Newark: University of Delaware Press. ISBN 978-0-87413-011-9.
- E. Weems. "The Black Paintings: Saturn".
- "Goya's Black Paintings". theartworlf. 12 June 2006.
