= Quinta del Sordo =

Former estate outside Madrid, Spain

Coordinates: 40.4115°N 3.7260°W

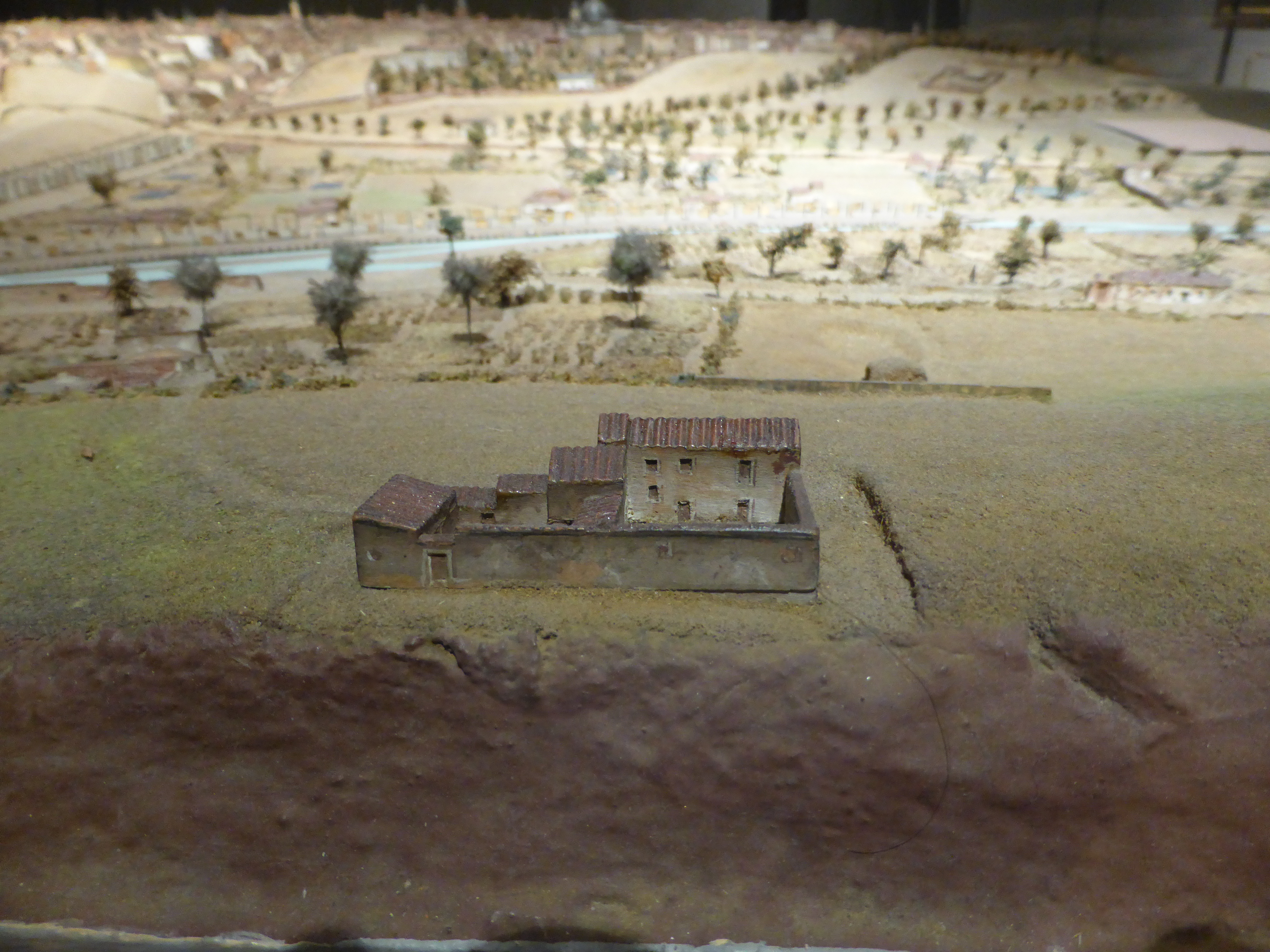
The Quinta del Sordo, in a scale model built between 1828 and 1830, at the Museo de Historia de Madrid (Museum of History).

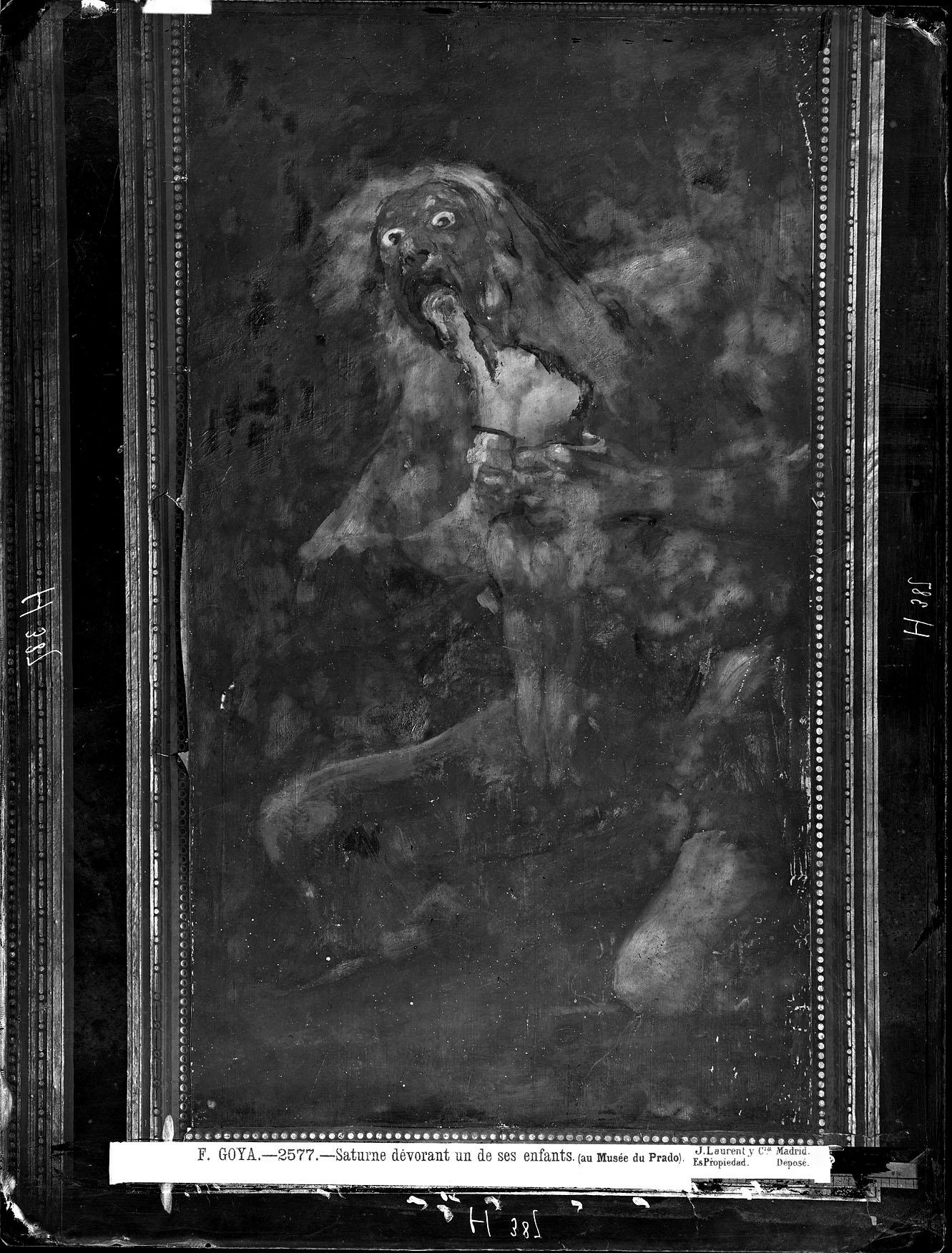
Saturn Devouring His Son in the Quinta de Goya, in 1874. Photograph by Jean Laurent. This painting was surrounded by a paper framework.

Quinta del Sordo (Spanish pronunciation: [ˈkinta ðel ˈsoɾðo]; lit. 'Estate of the Deaf One'), or Quinta de Goya, (Spanish: [ˈkinta ðe ˈɣoʝa]; lit. 'Goya's Estate') was an extensive estate and country house situated on a hill in the old municipality of Carabanchel on the outskirts of Madrid. The house is best known as the home of Francisco de Goya, where he painted 14 murals known as the Black Paintings. Contrary to popular belief, the estate was given its name due to the deafness of a prior owner, not Goya himself, who was deafened by illness in 1792. The house was demolished in 1909.

== Goya's ownership ==
Part of Madrid's city plan circa 1900 showing the location of the Quinta del Sordo

Francisco de Goya purchased the home on February 27, 1819 from a prior owner who was deaf. The house was initially composed of just two main rooms, each measuring 9 by 4.5 meters, and was decorated with rural motifs before Goya purchased it. Goya added a new wing for the kitchen. Goya lived in the home until his exile to Bordeaux in 1824, when he left his 17-year-old grandson Mariano in charge of the estate. During the brief periods when he would return to Madrid, Goya would stay at the home. Several reasons have been suggested for Goya's purchase of the estate. Given Goya's liberalism, it would have been somewhat important to him to distance himself from the totalitarian court of Fernando VII. After the fall of Rafael del Riego in 1823, Goya felt it necessary to leave the country and move to Bordeaux.

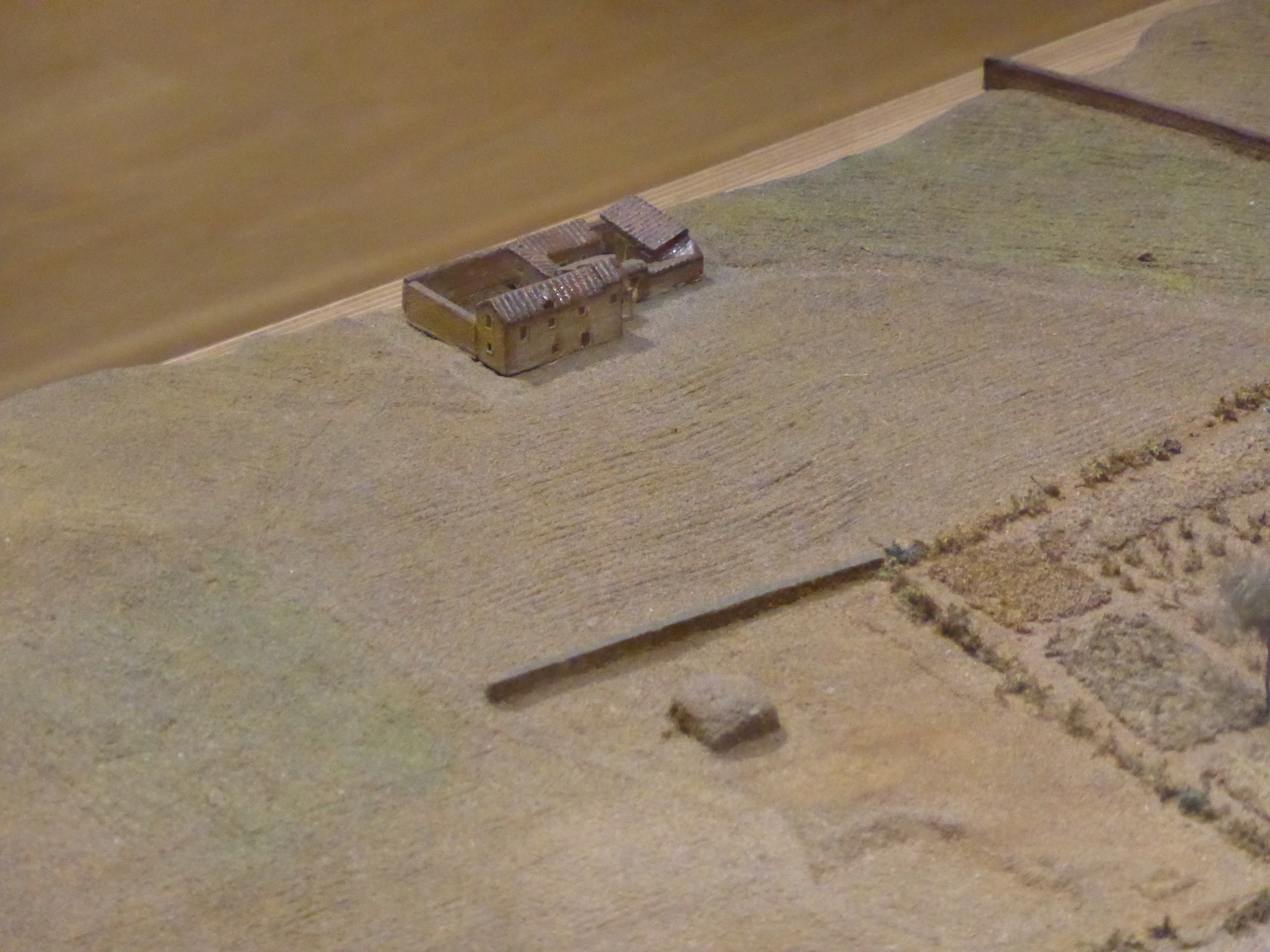
The Quinta de Goya, or Quinta del Sordo, in a scale model built between 1828 and 1830. Museum of History. Madrid

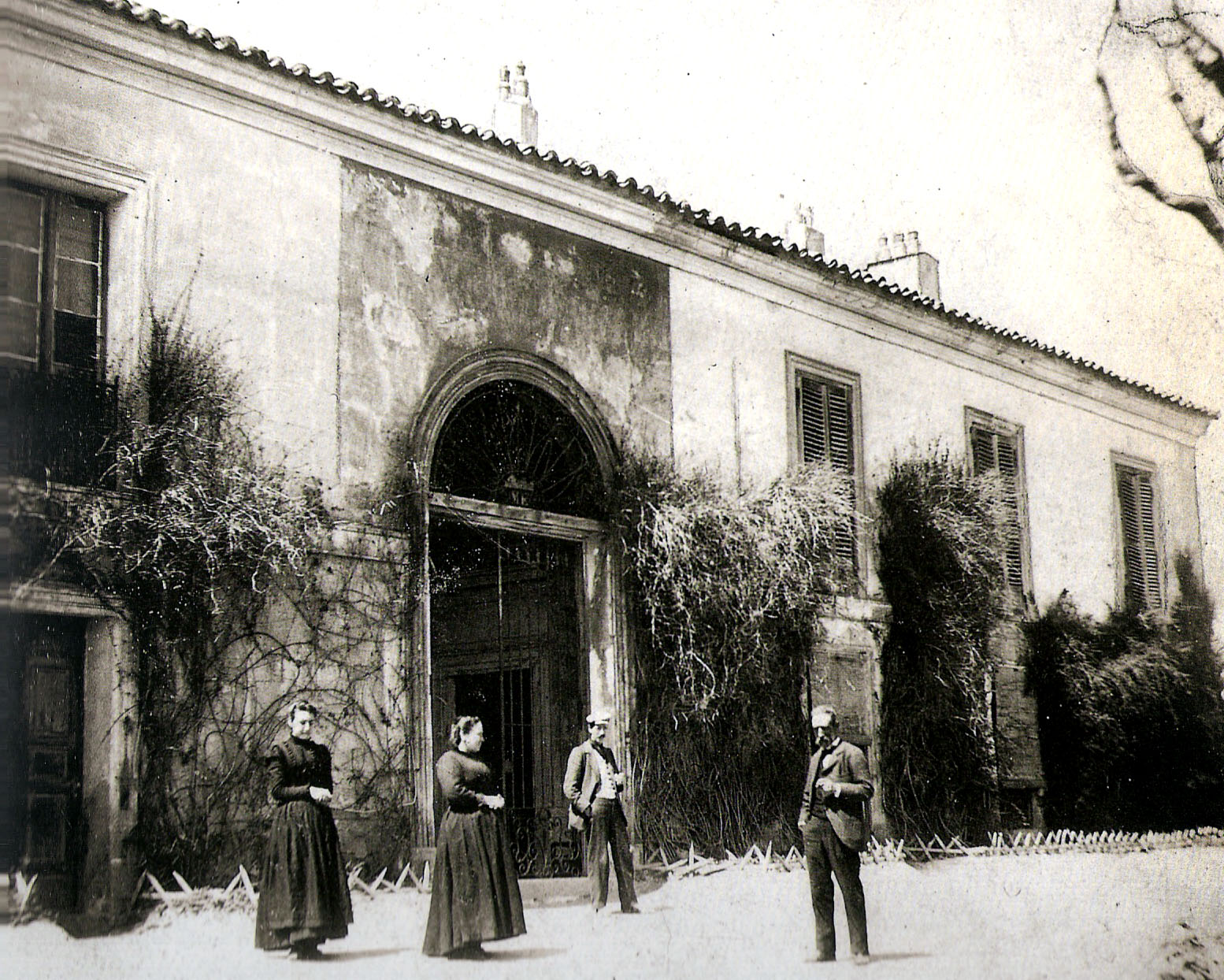
Mansion of the heirs of Goya, in the Quinta del Sordo, c. 1900. Magazine La Ilustración Española y Americana on July 15, 1909

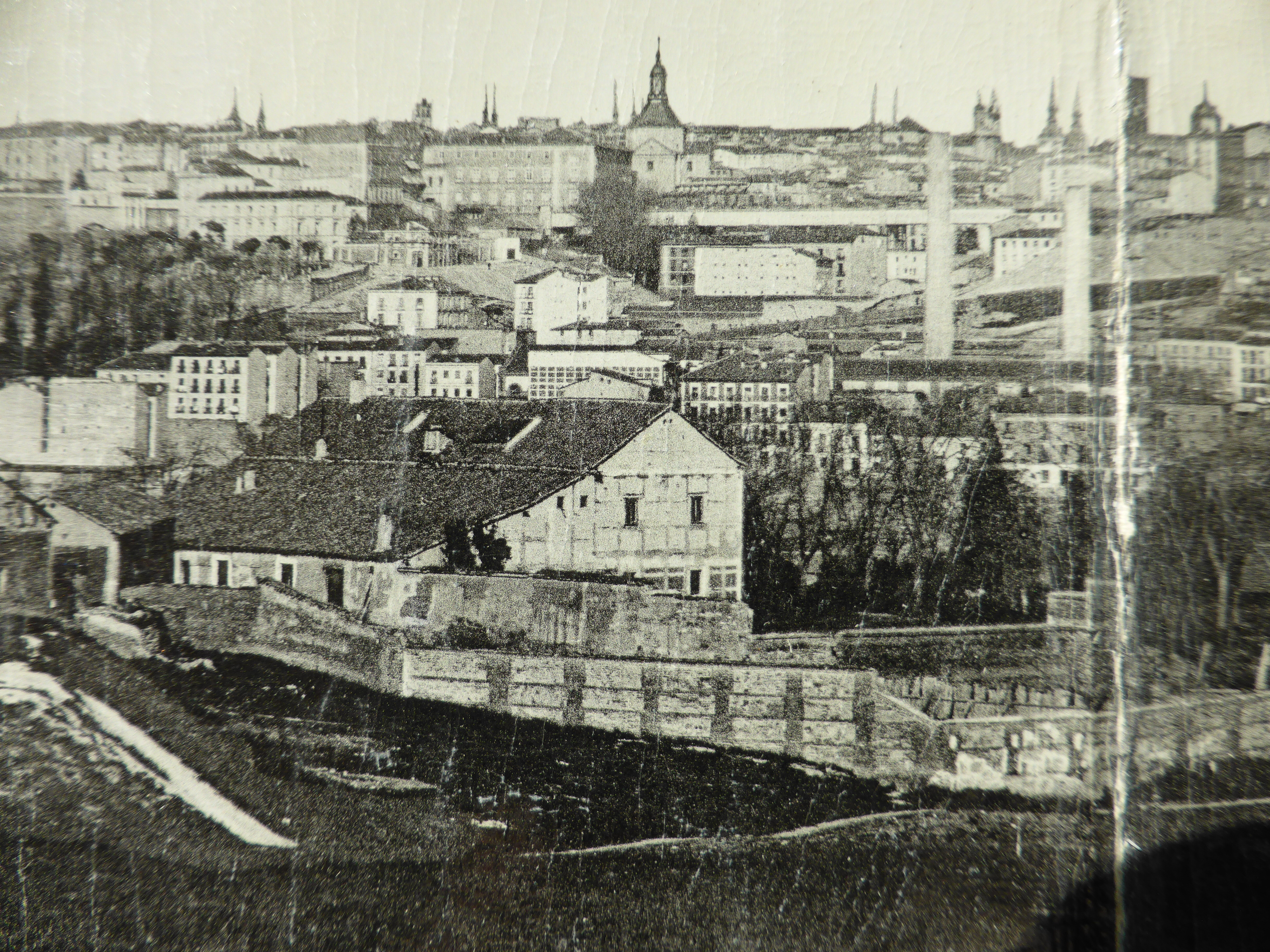
Mansion of the successors of Goya. Postcard, c. 1907

== See also ==
- Black Paintings
- Goya's birthhouse and the Museum of Engraving
