= Pilgrimage to the Fountain of San Isidro =

Painting by Francisco de Goya

- Peregrinación a la fuente de San Isidro (Spanish)
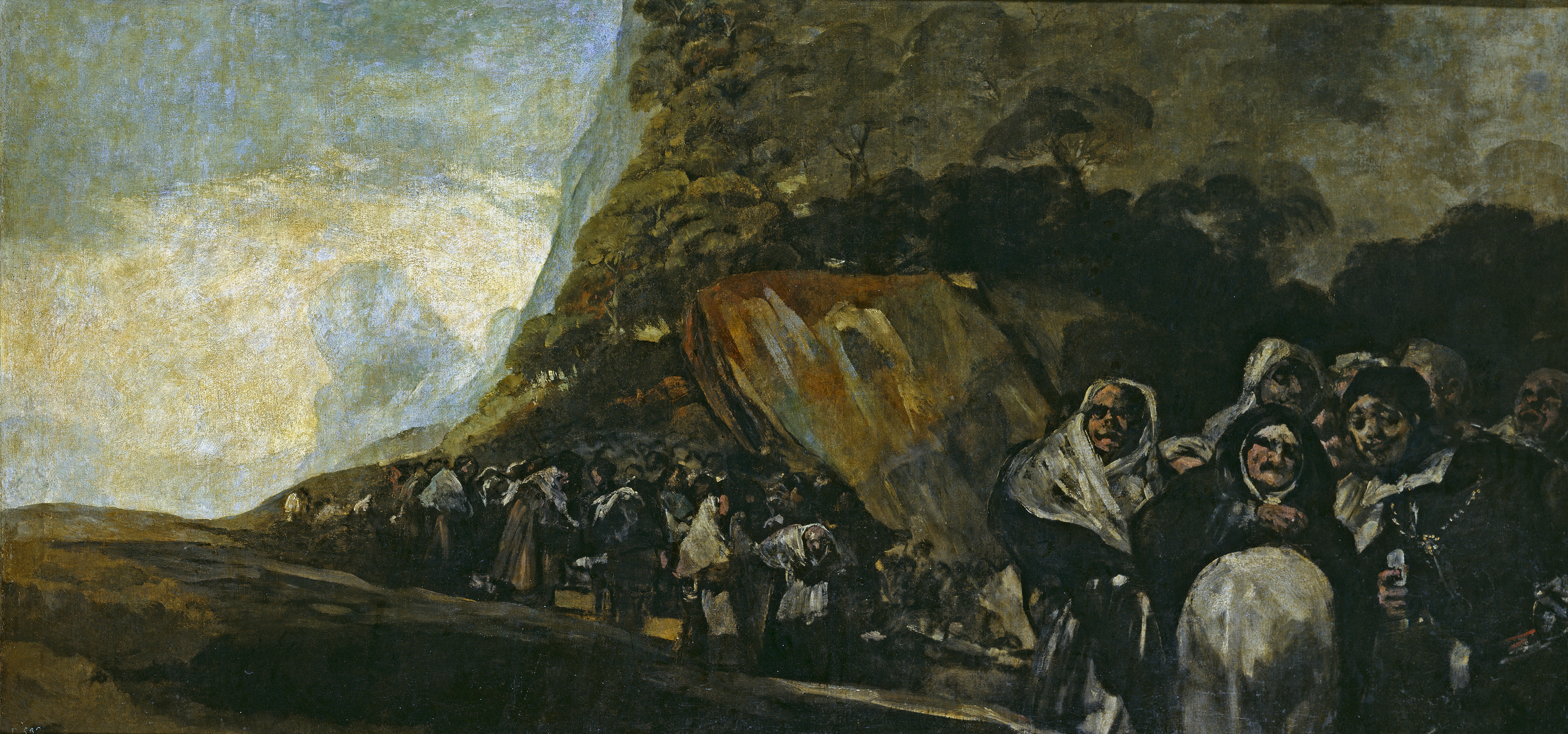
- Artist: Francisco Goya
- Year: c. 1821–1823
- Medium: Oil on plaster wall transferred to canvas
- Dimensions: 127 cm × 266 cm (50 in × 105 in)
- Location: Museo del Prado, Madrid

Pilgrimage to the Fountain of San Isidro or The Holy Office (Spanish: Peregrinación a la fuente de San Isidro or El Santo Official) are names given to an oil mural by the Spanish artist Francisco Goya (1746–1828), probably completed between 1821 and 1823. The mural is one of the fourteen Black Paintings that Goya applied in oil on the plaster walls of his house. Between 1874 and 1878 the paintings were transferred to canvas supports under the direction of the art restorer of the Museo del Prado, Salvador Martinez Cubells.

Pilgrimage depicts a procession headed by a group of eight more discernible people. One man wears clothing from the 17th century and carries a glass; another is a monk or a nun. The left half of the painting with its bright sky is among the lighter passages of the Black Paintings, which are dominated by browns, greys, and blacks. Another Black Painting, A Pilgrimage to San Isidro, seems of a piece with Pilgrimage except for its darker tone. Both may depict processions to the shrine of San Isidro—a thought reflected in their titles (none given by Goya)—which was close to his home, Quinta del Sordo.

== See also ==
- List of works by Francisco Goya

== Notes ==
- Dowling, John. "Buero Vallejo's Interpretation of Goya's Black Paintings". Hispania, Volume 56, No. 2, May 1973
- Glendinning, Nigel. "The Strange Translation of Goya's Black Paintings". The Burlington Magazine, Volume 117, No. 868, 1975
