= Two Old Ones Eating Soup =

Painting by Francisco de Goya

- Dos viejos comiendo sopa (Spanish)
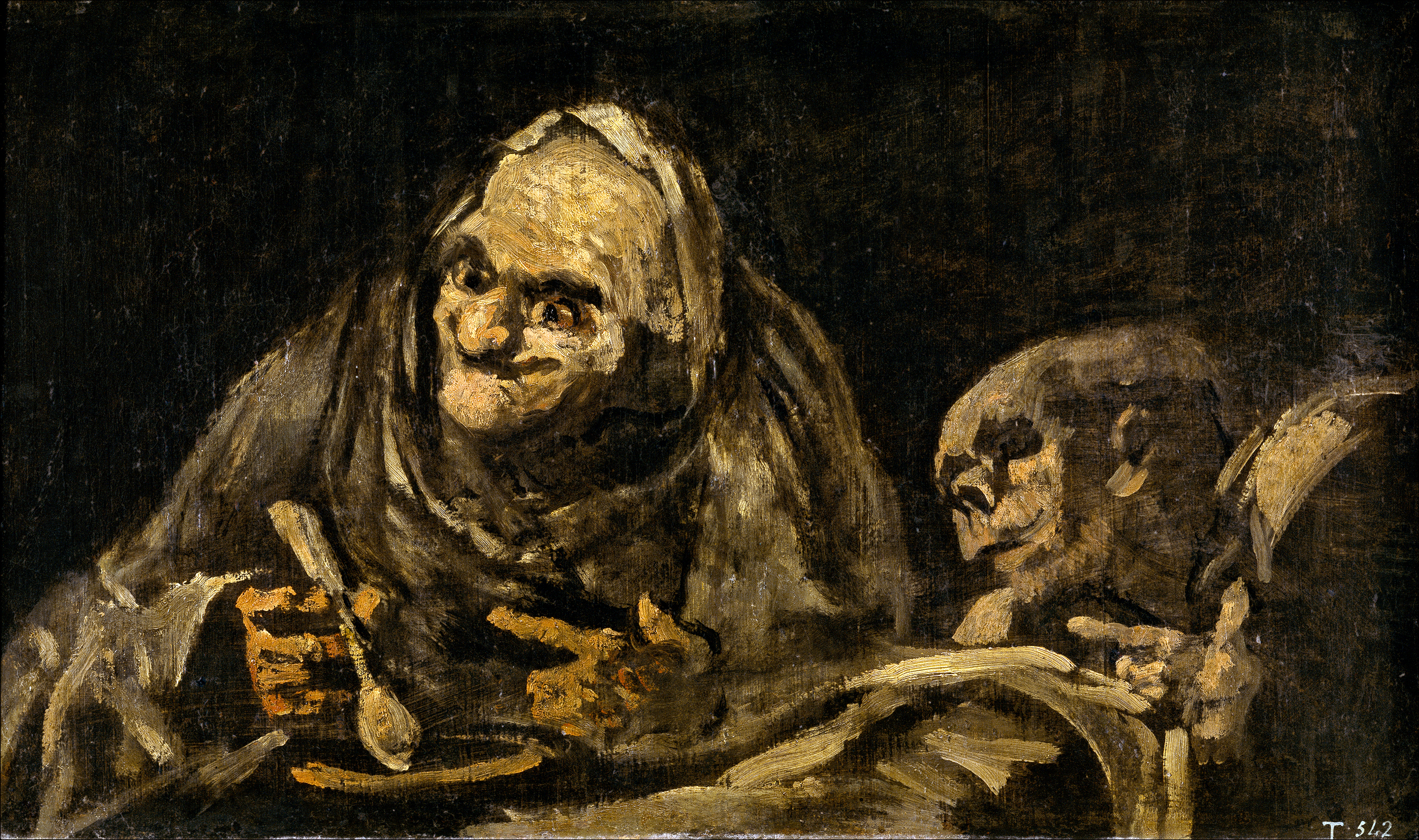
- Artist: Francisco Goya
- Year: c. 1819–1823
- Medium: Oil mural transferred to canvas
- Dimensions: 49.3 cm × 83.4 cm (19.4 in × 32.8 in)
- Location: Museo del Prado, Madrid

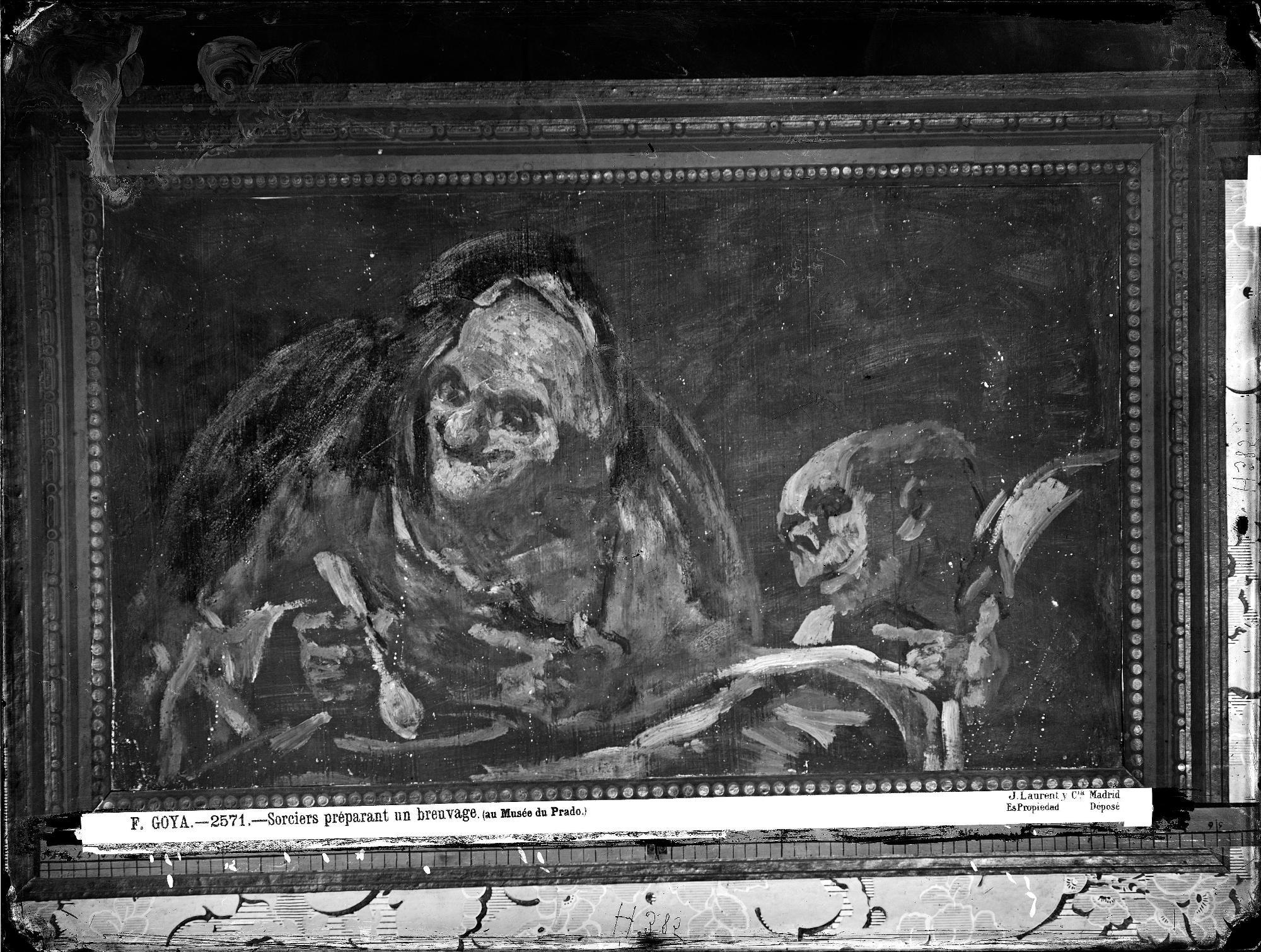
The original painting on the wall of the Quinta de Goya, photographed in 1874 by Jean Laurent. The sign indicating "Museo del Prado" was added in the original glass negative, circa 1890.

Two Old Ones Eating Soup (Spanish: Dos viejos comiendo sopa) or Two Witches (Spanish: Dos Brujas) is one of the fourteen Black Paintings created by Francisco Goya between 1819 and 1823. By this time, Goya was in his mid-70s and deeply disillusioned. He painted the works on the interior walls of the house known as the Quinta del Sordo ("House of the Deaf Man"). They were not intended for public display. Two Old Ones Eating Soup likely occupied a position above the main door to the house, between La Leocadia and Two Old Men.

Like the other Black Paintings, it was transferred to canvas in 1874–1878 under the supervision of Salvador Martínez Cubells, a curator at the Museo del Prado, Madrid. The owner, Baron Émile d'Erlanger, donated the canvases to the Spanish state in 1881, and they are now on display at the Prado.

In the image, two elderly figures loom forward from a black background; although they are assumed to be men, their gender is not readily apparent. The mouth of the left figure is drawn into a grimace, possibly from lack of teeth. In stark contrast to this animated expression, the face of the other figure hardly seems alive at all. Its eyes are black hollows and the head in general bears the aspect of a skull.

As in the rest of the Black Paintings, Goya's use of his medium displays remarkable assurance. Paint is handled freely and rapidly yet with great decisiveness. The palette knife is also used to apply paint in some areas. Blacks, ochres, earth tones and grays are the only colors used, as in the rest of the Black Paintings.

== See also ==
- List of works by Francisco Goya

== Bibliography ==
- Hughes, Robert. Goya. New York: Alfred A. Knopf, 2004. ISBN 0-394-58028-1
- Junquera, Juan José. The Black Paintings of Goya. London: Scala Publishers, 2008. ISBN 1-85759-273-5
