= Heads in a landscape =

Francisco Goya painting

Heads in a Landscape
- Cabezas en un paisaje (Spanish)
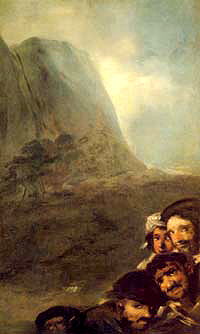
- Artist: Francisco Goya
- Year: c. 1820-1823
- Medium: Oil mural on plaster transferred to canvas
- Dimensions: 112 cm × 67 cm (44.1 in × 26.4 in)
- Owner: Stanley Moss & Company

Heads In a Landscape (Spanish: Cabezas en un paisaje) is the name usually given to a painting generally attributed to the Spanish artist Francisco Goya. It was completed sometime between 1820 and 1823, and is possibly the 15th in Goya's series of Black Paintings that were painted directly on the walls of the Quinta del Sordo, or villa of the deaf man.

== Background ==
In 1819, Goya moved into the Quinta del Sordo, a two-story country house with a large estate on the outskirts of Madrid. Although the Quinta del Sordo (villa of the deaf man) was so named because of its previous owner, at this point in his life Goya was deaf himself due to a severe, unknown illness that likely contributed to his isolation and mental strain, as reflected in the black paintings.

diagram of where each painting was most probably located in the Quinta del Sordo, where Heads in a Landscape was possibly painted on the blank space adjacent to The Dog.

Heads in a landscape most likely made a pair with The Dog, positioned on the first story beside the entrance to the room.

The painting was transferred to canvas sometime before 1846. Some detail may have been lost during the transfer and restoration of the image.

Vicente López took note of the painting in an 1846 inventory of artworks at the Vista Alegre Palace, where it belonged to Maria Cristina de Borbon. Her daughter, Infanta Luisa Fernanda, inherited it. it was then inherited by her son, Infante Antonio. It was later sold to Contini Bonacossi by the Countess of Paris. Stanley Moss purchased it from Contini Bonacossi.

== Analysis ==
The painting shows five figures in the lower right-hand corner with all but their heads outside of the frame. In the background is a stark cliff with some trees at its base. It uses mostly shades of ochre and muted colours in its composition. The figures are described as having mischievous expressions and also as peering outside of the image.

The picture may remind modern viewers of a selfie image due to its angle and how the subjects are looking at the viewpoint.

== Authenticity ==
In his 1828 inventory of the paintings at the Quinta del Sordo, Antonio Brugada mentions seven murals on the ground floor and eight on the second floor, but only 14 noted by Charles Yriarte in 1867, who said that one had already been removed from the walls. The painting already removed by the time Yriate visited the house is suspected to be Heads in a landscape. This is suspected because Heads in a landscape is of a similar size and dimensions to that of The Dog that it is said to be a pair with, and the landscape is found to match up with that of The Dog and Fight With Cudgels. The age, style, and subject matter also factor into why it is a highly likely candidate for being a part of the Black Paintings.

Heads in a landscape as well as all of the black paintings have been called into question for authenticity due to a lack of clear information on whether there was an additional story about the Quinta del Sordo and whether certain sources can be trusted. Most art historians attribute Heads in a landscape, if not to Francisco Goya, to his son Javier.
