= A Pilgrimage to San Isidro =

Painting by Francisco de Goya

- La romería de San Isidro (Spanish)
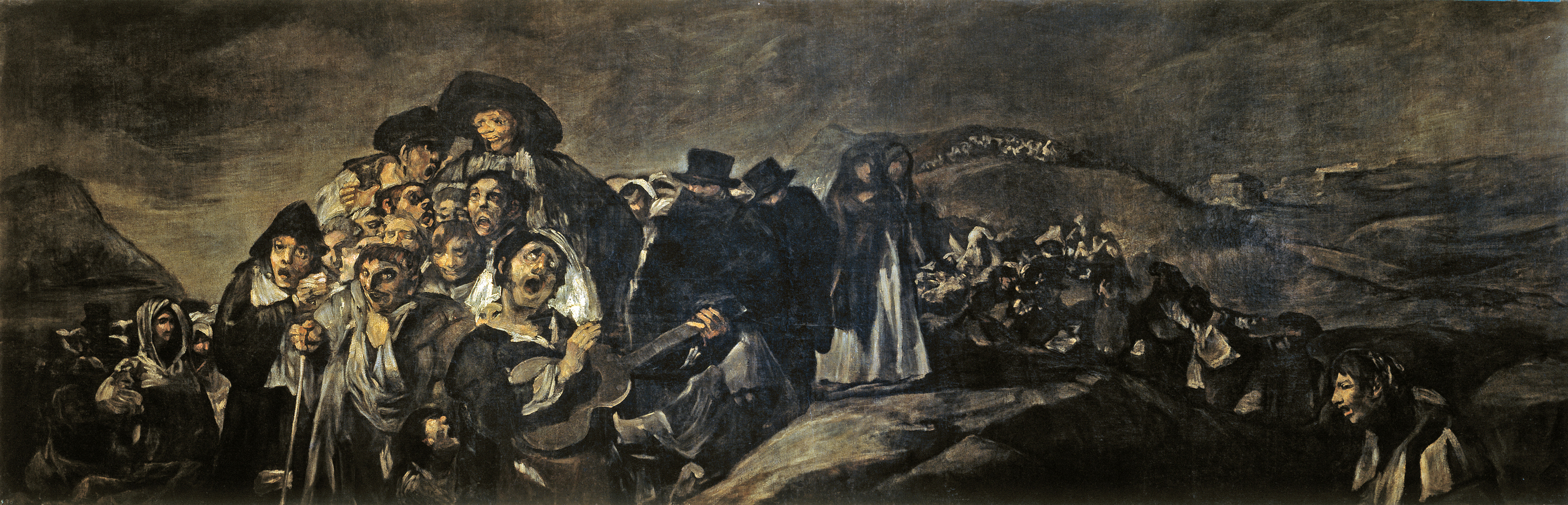
- Artist: Francisco Goya
- Year: 1819–1823
- Medium: Oil mural transferred to canvas
- Dimensions: 140 cm × 438 cm (55 in × 172 in)
- Location: Museo del Prado, Madrid

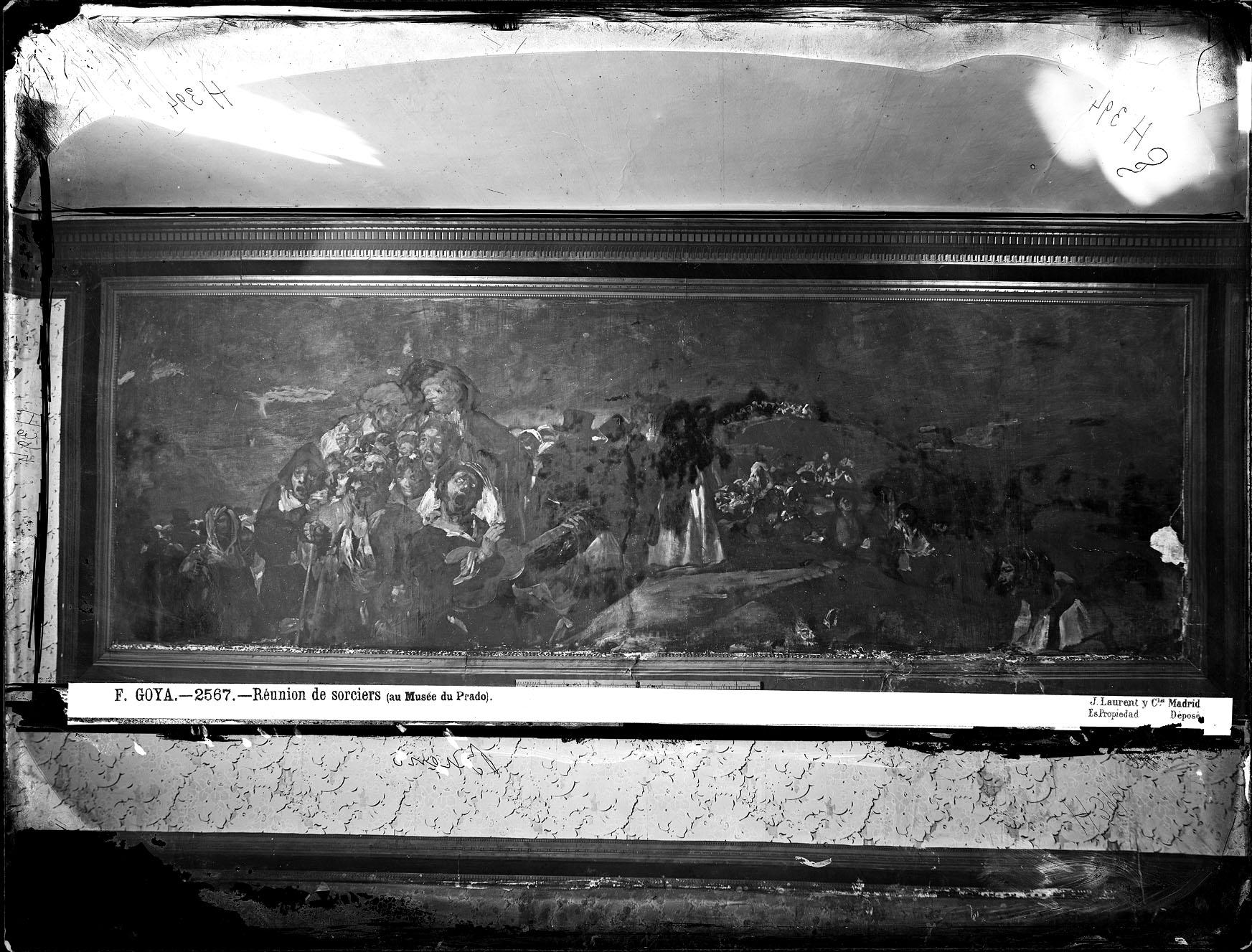
Photo of the wall of the old house of Goya, done by J. Laurent in 1874.

A Pilgrimage to San Isidro (Spanish: La romería de San Isidro) is one of the Black Paintings painted by Francisco de Goya between 1819–23 on the interior walls of the house known as Quinta del Sordo ("The House of the Deaf Man") that he purchased in 1819. It probably occupied a wall on the first floor of the house, opposite The Great He-Goat.

Like the other Black Paintings, it was transferred to canvas in 1873–74 under the supervision of Salvador Martínez Cubells, a curator at the Museo del Prado. The owner, Baron Emile d'Erlanger, donated the canvases to the Spanish state in 1881, and they are now on display at the Museo del Prado.

A Pilgrimage to San Isidro shows a view of the pilgrimage towards San Isidro's Hermitage of Madrid that is totally opposite to Goya's treatment of the same subject thirty years earlier in The Meadow of San Isidro. If the earlier work was a question of depicting the customs of a traditional holiday in Madrid and providing a reasonably accurate view of the city, the present painting depicts a group of prominent figures in the night, apparently intoxicated and singing with distorted faces. Figures from diverse social strata also figure in the painting. In the foreground a group of humble extraction appears, while farther into the background top hats and nuns' habits can be seen.

The topic of the procession was used to emphasize theatrical or satirical aspects; in this respect the picture has parallels to The Burial of the Sardine, painted between 1812 and 1819. The locale of Goya's house, which was the repository for his Black Paintings, had approximately the same vantage point in which we view the pilgrims in his earlier tapestry cartoon. Now, in this darker painting, the procession may be leading up to this very house and into Goya's haunted imagination. "It is Goya whom they have come to see. And to serenade: for what does it matter to a deaf man that the guitar has no strings?"

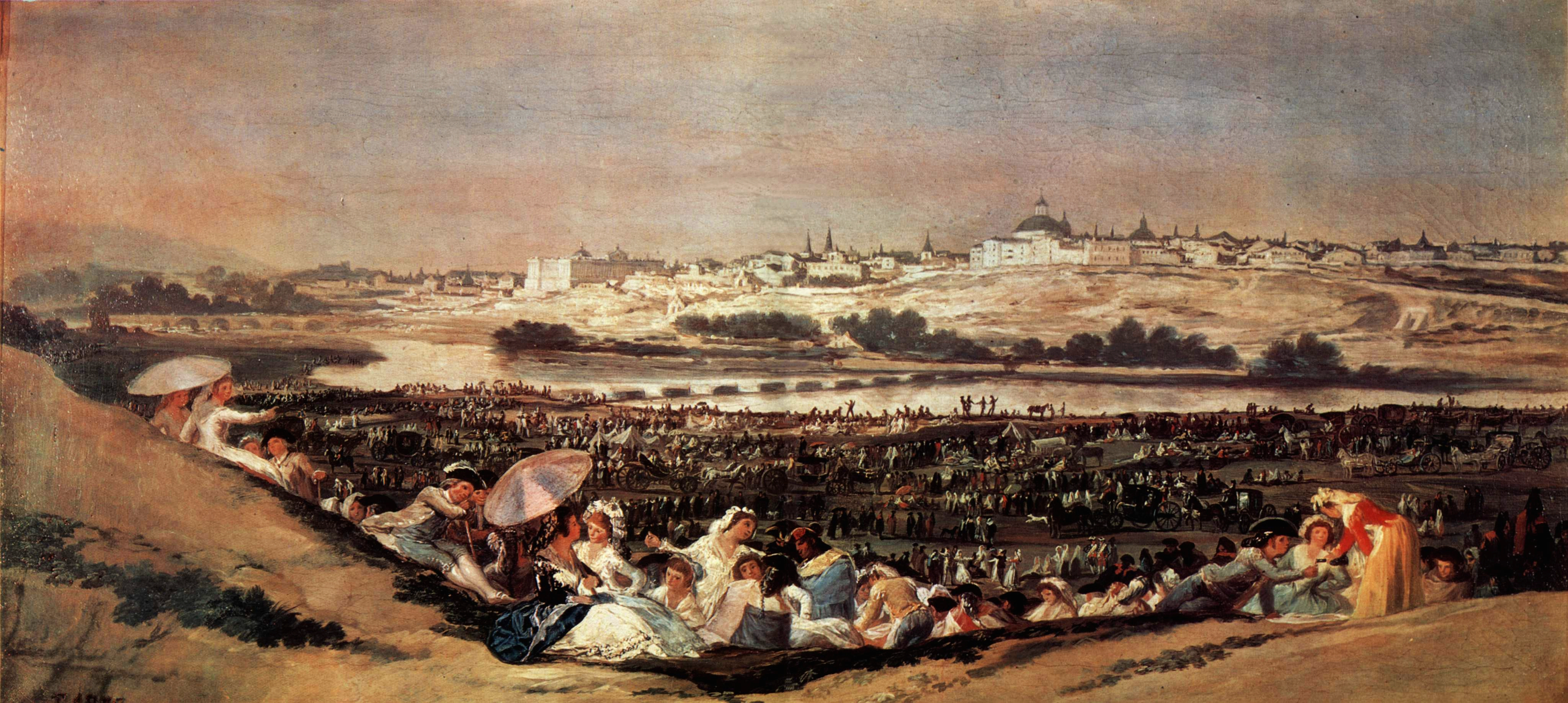
The Meadow of San Isidro, 44 × 94 cm (1788). Museo del Prado

It is a recurring theme in Goya's paintings to present a crowd that fades little by little into the distance. Already it was present in San Isidro's Meadow and it was later used frequently in The Disasters of War. At the very edge of this painting the silhouette of the rocky outcroppings and that of the parading multitude coincide; this way, the open space emphasizes the whole rest of the solid and compact mass, dehumanizing the individuals into a formless group. The exception is a figure to the right whose face can be seen in profile and seems to moan or sing.

Like the other works in this series, the painting's palette is very diminished. In this case, blacks, ochres, grays and earth tones are applied with very free, energetic brushstrokes. The theme of the loss of identity in crowds in this painting can be seen as a precursor to expressionist painting, particularly the work of James Ensor.

== See also ==
- List of works by Francisco Goya

== Bibliography ==
- Benito Oterino, Agustín, La luz en la quinta del sordo: estudio de las formas y cotidianidad, Madrid, Universidad Complutense, 2002, p. 33. Edición digital ISBN 84-669-1890-6.
- Bozal, Valeriano, Francisco Goya, vida y obra, (2 vols.) Madrid, Tf. Editores, 2005. ISBN 84-96209-39-3.
- Bozal, Valeriano, Pinturas Negras de Goya, Tf. Editores, Madrid, 1997.
- Glendinning, Nigel, Francisco de Goya, Madrid, Cuadernos de Historia 16 (col. «El arte y sus creadores», nº 30), 1993.
- Hagen, Rose-Marie and Hagen, Rainer, Francisco de Goya, Cologne, Taschen, 2003. ISBN 3-8228-2296-5.
- Hughes, Robert. Goya. New York: Alfred A. Knopf, 2004. ISBN 0-394-58028-1
