= The Colossus (painting) =

Painting by Francisco de Goya

- El Coloso (Spanish)
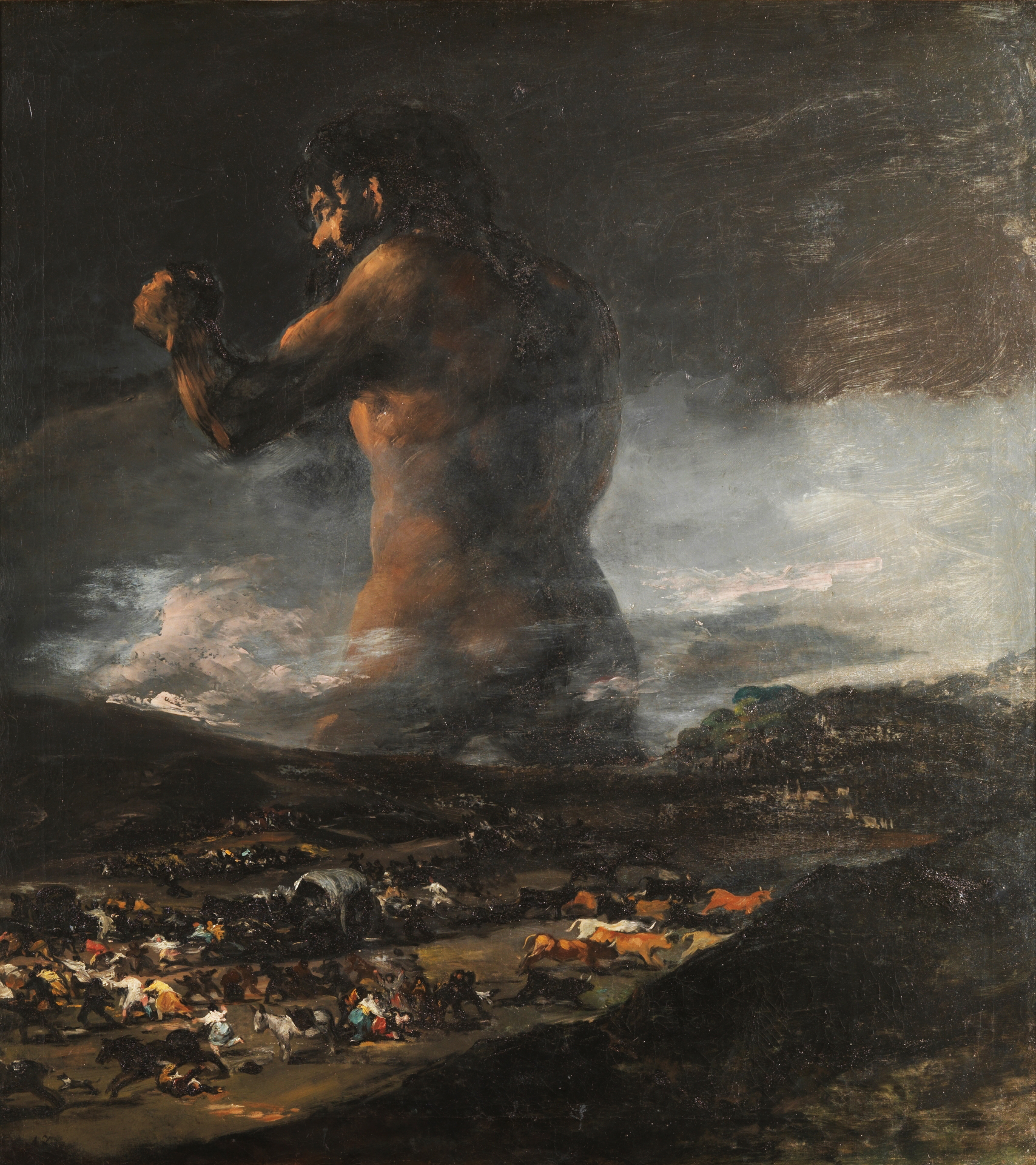
- Artist: attributed to Francisco de Goya
- Year: after 1808
- Medium: Oil on canvas
- Dimensions: 116 cm × 105 cm (46 in × 41 in)
- Location: Museo del Prado, Madrid

The Colossus (also known as The Giant), is known in Spanish as El Coloso and also El Gigante (The Giant), El Pánico (The Panic) and La Tormenta (The Storm). It is a painting traditionally attributed to Francisco de Goya that shows a giant in the centre of the canvas walking towards the left hand side of the picture. Mountains obscure his legs up to his thighs and clouds surround his body; the giant appears to be adopting an aggressive posture as he is holding one of his fists up at shoulder height. A dark valley containing a crowd of people and herds of cattle fleeing in all directions occupies the lower third of the painting.

The painting became the property of Goya's son, Javier Goya, in 1812. The painting was later owned by Pedro Fernández Durán, who bequeathed his collection to Madrid's Museo del Prado, where it has been kept since 1931.

== History of the painting ==
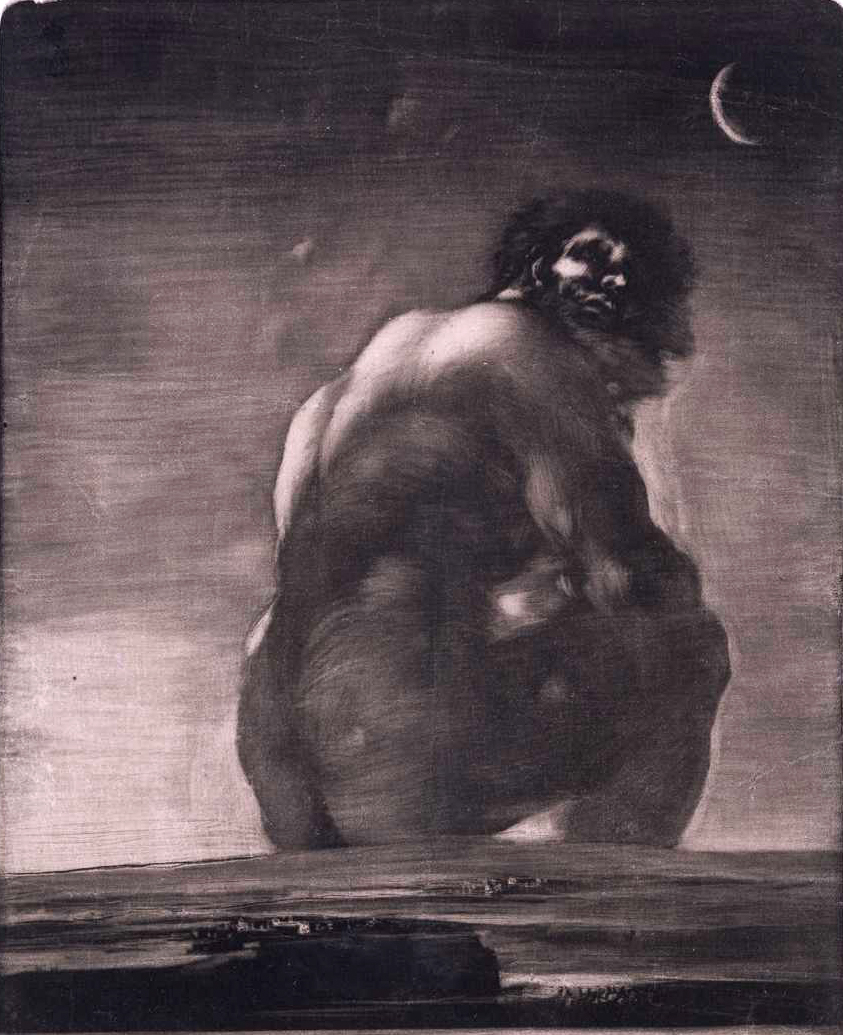
The Giant, also called The Colossus (unnumbered print, 1814–1818). Burnished aquatint etching by Francisco de Goya, the bottom part of the print, where the title would have been inserted, has been cropped.

The painting became part of the Museo del Prado's collection in 1931, when it was donated by the estate of Pedro Fernández Durán. The first documented attribution of the painting to Goya dates from 1946 when Francisco Javier Sánchez Cantón published the inventory of the estate of Josefa Bayeu, Goya's wife, on her death in 1812. The inventory describes a painting of "a giant" with the same measurements as The Colossus, which was identified with an X (Xavier Goya) and the number 18.

The painting was passed into the ownership of Miguel Fernández Durán Fernández de Pinedo y Bizarrón, Marquis of Perales, as he left it to his great-grandson, Pedro Fernández Durán upon his death in 1833. The painting is listed in the notarised estate of Paula Bernaldo de Quirós (Marchioness of Perales and Tolosa and mother of Pedro Fernández Durán) upon her death in 1877. At this time the painting was described as "A prophetic allegory of the misfortunes that took place during the War of Independence, Goya original, measuring 1.15 by 1.[0]3 (global measurement units) having a value of one thousand five hundred pesetas".

More recently, the questions raised regarding the authorship of The Colossus and its absence from the Prado's exhibition Goya in wartime have focussed attention on, among other matters, Goya's etching of the same theme, which was included in the same exhibition (exhibition catalogue number 28). In an article titled "Artistic technique as a research method relating to Goya's 'The Colossus'" (in the journal Goya No. 324) Jesusa Vega established the relationship between the etching known as The Giant (of which there is a duplicate copy in the Spanish National Library in Madrid) and The Colossus in these words: "the giant, moves from resistance / defence, proud and erect, to slumped melancholy, reflecting the mood of many Spaniards, a collective feeling shared by its creator". If the painting is attributed as being painted between 1808—the start of the Peninsular War—and 1812—when the painting is recorded as being among the goods divided between Goya and his son Javier—then the print should be dated as originating after the end of the war due to the technique and materials used in the series of etchings The Disasters of War.

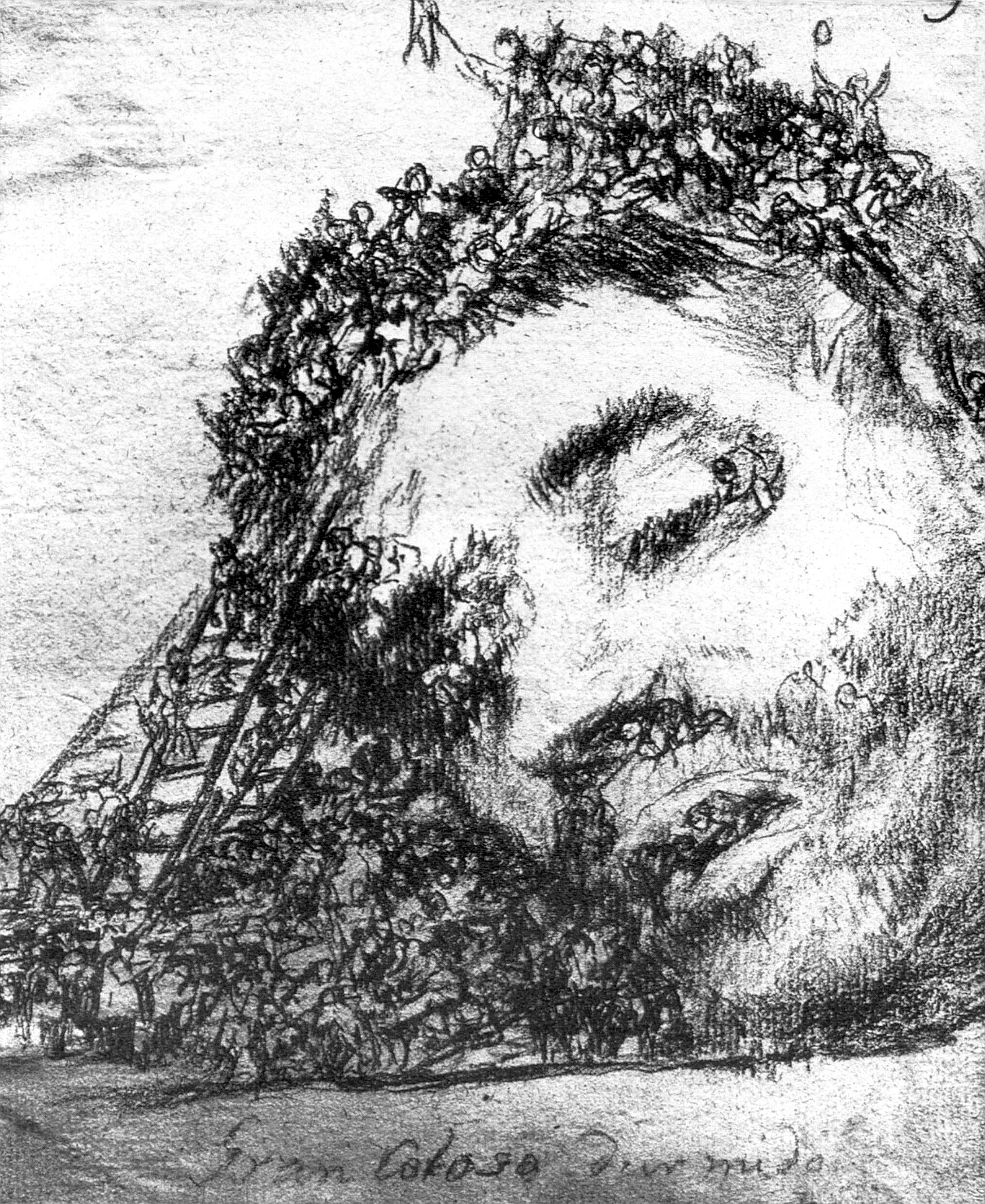
Drawing with the title Gran Coloso dormido (Large sleeping Giant) in Goya's handwriting. Lithographic pencil, Album G-3 or First Burdeos Album (1824–1828), former Gerstenberg collection, Berlin, and Hermitage Museum (Saint Petersburg).

== Analysis ==
The large body of the giant occupies the centre of the composition. It appears to be adopting a fighting pose due to the position of its one visible arm and its clenched fist. The picture was painted during the Peninsular War so it could be a symbolic representation of that war. Nigel Glendinning states that the picture is based on a patriotic poem written by Juan Bautista Arriaza called Pyrenean Prophecy published in 1810. The poem represents the Spanish people as a giant arising from the Pyrenees in order to oppose the Napoleonic invasion. Goya's painting The Eagle, which was found in the possession of Goya's son in 1836, is similar in size and allegorical character to The Colossus. Nigel Glendinning considers this proof that Goya conceived of paintings with a similar concept to The Colossus.

The giant's posture has been the object of a number of interpretations. It is unknown if it is walking or firmly planted with legs spread apart. The giant's position is also ambiguous, it could be behind the mountains or buried up to above its knees. The subject's legs are also obscured in Saturn Devouring His Son and the subject is even buried up to its neck—or possibly it is behind an embankment—in The Dog, which in Spanish is sometimes referred to as Perro Semihundido (Semi-submerged Dog). Some experts have suggested that the giant appears to have his eyes shut, which could represent the idea of blind violence.

In contrast to the erect figure of the giant are the tiny figures in the valley that are fleeing in all directions. The only exception is a donkey that is standing still, Juan J. Luna has suggested that this figure could represent an incomprehension of the horrors of war.

The technique used in this painting is similar to that used in Goya's Black Paintings, which were originally painted on the walls of Goya's house, Quinta del Sordo. A later date for the painting of the picture has even been suggested, which would mean that The Colossus mentioned in the inventory of 1812 is a different painting. However, Nigel Glendinning has refuted this later dating with arguments solely based on stylistic features of the painting. Glendinning argues that all the stylistic features found in The Colossus are already present (although not to the same degree) in Goya's previous paintings from The Meadow of San Isidro in 1788, which contains small figures painted with quick strokes; to Los Caprichos (1799) numbers 3 (Here comes the bogeyman) and 52 (What a tailor can do) for the theme of an oversized figure that is frightening. As well as some drawings found in Goya's sketchbooks such as A giant figure on a balcony, A hooded giant and Proclamation Dream of the Witches (Gassier and Wilson No.s. 625, 633 and 638).

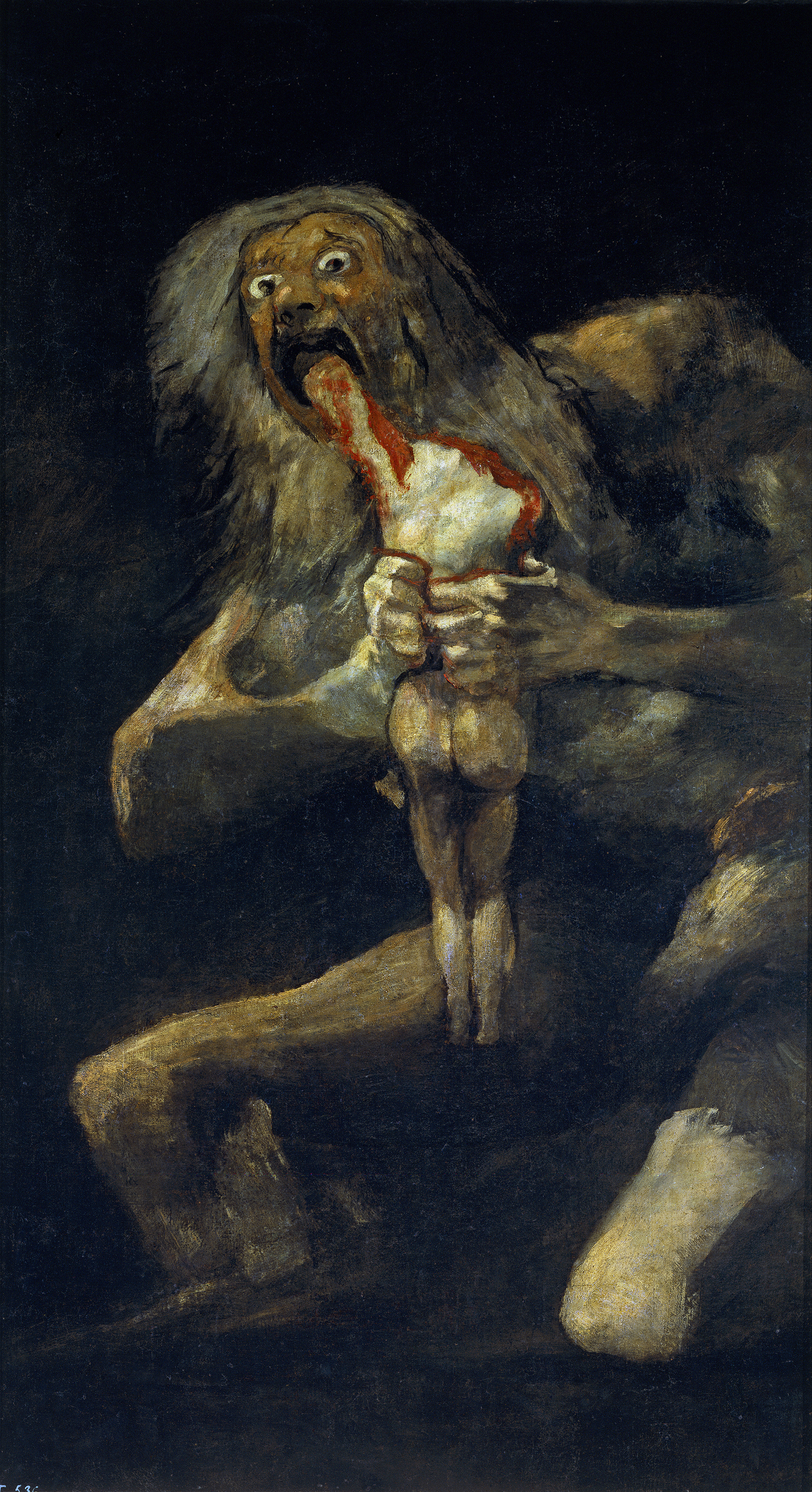
Saturn Devouring His Son, one of the Black Paintings by Goya (1819–1823).

A series of parallel themes also exist in Disasters of War and the eponymous unnumbered print The Giant or Colossus, dating from between 1814 and 1818, which shows a giant seated in a dark and desolate landscape with a crescent moon in the top corner. However, the giant's posture and the darkness of the night express a solitude that is different from the aggression shown in the painting and the print is not obviously related to war. It is not possible to ascertain if the giant's eyes are shut in the print, but it appears to be listening out for something. That is, the giant is doing something that perhaps Goya, who had been deaf since 1793, longed to be able to do. Or perhaps the giant's posture reflects the alert attentiveness of someone who is deaf or blind or both.

What is certain is that the oil painting is stylistically similar to the Black Paintings. The colour black predominates, the touches of colour are minimalistic and applied with a spatula and the theme appears to be related to certain German works belonging to the Storm and Stress (Sturm und Drang) movement of early Romanticism. Goya's emphasis on the emotional element of the panic that has caused the chaotic flight of the populace also reflects this early Romanticist aesthetic. As does the symbolism of the giant as the incarnation of ideas of identity in the collective consciousness or Volkgeist. Especially when this consciousness is linked with aggression that was seen as coming from outside forces. These ideas arose with idealist German romanticism and they were widespread in the Europe of the early 19th century. The era's patriotic poetry, such as Pyrenean Prophecy, was known by heart by many Spaniards, including Goya, who was also friends with well-known Enlightenment writers and pre-Romantic thinkers.

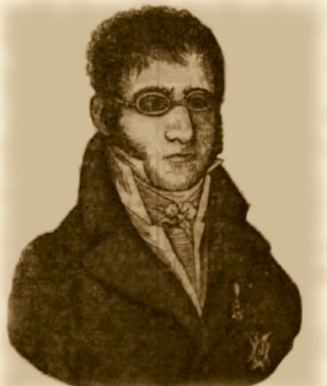
Juan Bautista Arriaza, author of the Pyrenean Prophecy (in Poesías patrióticas Patriotic Poems, 1810), probably the source of inspiration for the iconography of The Colossus.

Other interpretations regarding the meaning of this painting have also been offered. Regarding the emblems, it has been suggested that the giant may represent an incompetent and arrogant Fernando VII of Spain where the mountains act to emphasise his arrogance. In addition, it has been suggested that the stationary donkey represents an ossified aristocracy that is beholden to an absolute monarchy. Studies of representations of giants in satirical cartoons of this period or of the mythical figure Hercules have suggested that the giant in the painting represents the Spanish monarchy opposing the Napoleonic regime. Investigations that have used X-ray analysis of the giant's posture have suggested that the figure is similar to the Farnese Hercules represented in etchings by Hendrick Goltzius or the Spanish Hercules painted by Francisco de Zurbarán in his The Labours of Hercules series, which is found among the great paintings of battles found in the Salón de Reinos in the Buen Retiro Palace in Madrid.

However, Glendinning has insisted that the idea of a giant is common in the patriotic poetry of the Peninsular War. The idea is prefigured in the Spanish Golden Age by the allegorical figures of the baroque theatre (The Siege of Numantia by Miguel de Cervantes contains a passage in which Spain is represented in a dialogue with the River Duero) and many of these figures are apparitions blessed by God (such as Saint James or Saint George in important battles against the Moors) in order to motivate the soldiers involved in battle. There are similar giants in Manuel José Quintana's patriotic poem To Spain, After the March Revolution, in which the giant shadows cast by such Spanish heroes as Ferdinand III of Castile, Gonzalo Fernández de Córdoba (El Gran Capitán) and Rodrigo Díaz de Vivar (El Cid) urge on the resistance. In a poem by Cristóbal de Beña the shadow of James I of Aragon (Jaime I el Conquistador) is invoked for similar purposes. In the poem Zaragoza by Francisco Martínez de la Rosa, General Palafox commander of the Siege of Zaragoza (1808) is encouraged by his predecessor Rodrigo de Rebolledo. Finally, the victor in the Battle of Las Navas de Tolosa, the king Alfonso VIII of Castile is mentioned in the hymn celebrating the Battle of Bailén written by Juan Bautista Arriaza.

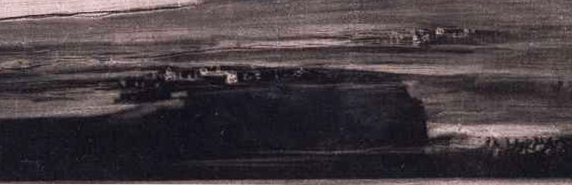
Detail of the urban landscape from the print called A Giant or The Colossus

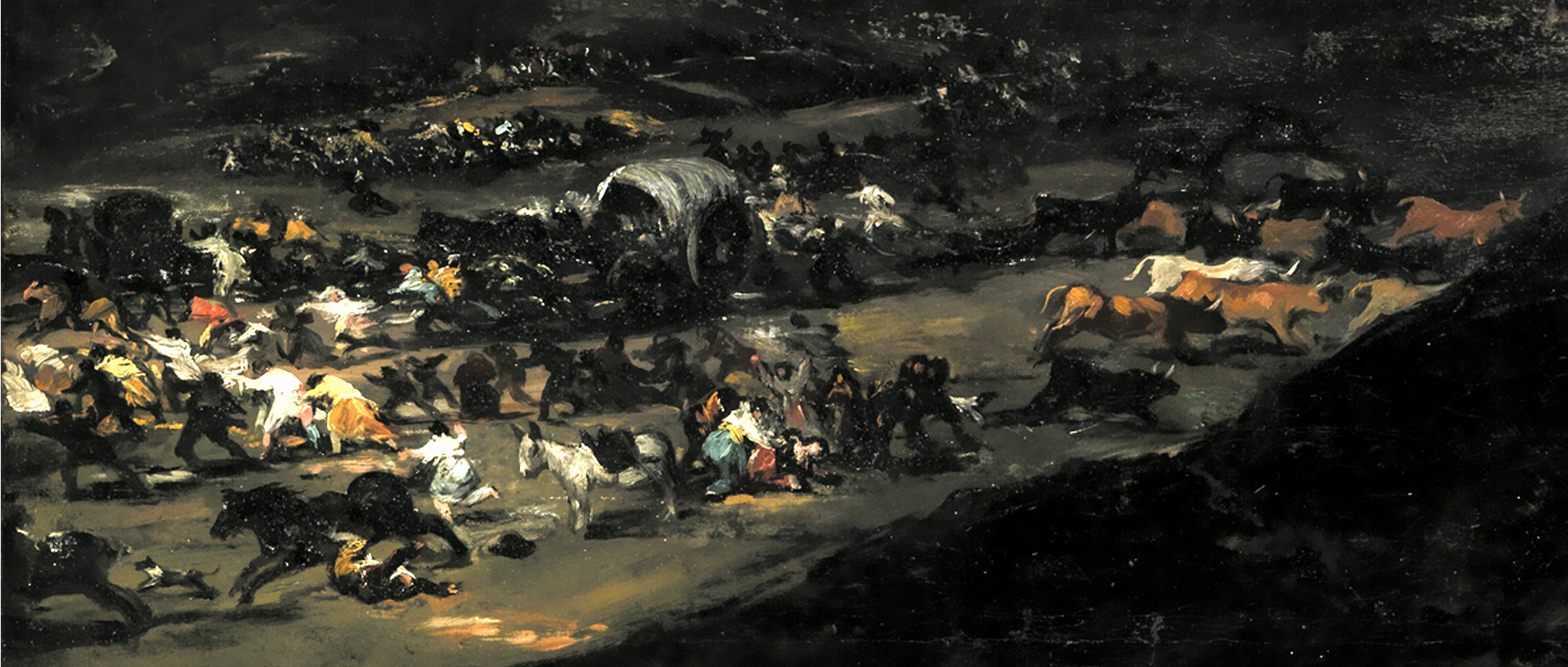
Detail of the lower part of the painting. People and animals flee in various directions, forming a dynamic composition with centrifugal lines.

Despite all the aforementioned, there are still unknown elements in the painting. There is no convincing argument regarding the direction that the giant is moving in (if it is moving at all), and it is impossible to see the enemy that it is opposing. However, on the latter point some authors consider it highly likely that the mountainous terrain hides the enemy army on the other side of the valley that the civilians are fleeing along. It has therefore been proposed that the painting most probably shows a confrontation between an invading French army and the giant, representing the defending Spanish forces, as described in Ariaza's poem. The giant's willingness to fight with his bare hands and without weapons is also described by Arriaza in his poem Memories of the Second of May, which stresses the heroic nature of the Spanish nation. The giant's heroism contrasts with the fear of the rest of the population, who are fleeing and dispersing in many different directions, only pausing occasionally to help someone who has collapsed or due to the legendary stubbornness of a mule.

In terms of the axis of the composition, there are a number of signals that dynamically represent the directions in which the multitude is fleeing, which is mainly towards and beyond the painting's lower left hand corner. There is another opposing axis shown by the stampede of the bulls to the right. Amongst all this movement there are some figures that are attending to a fallen person or someone in difficulty, which provides a counterpoint to the movement and emphasizes the impression of chaos. The giant is separated from the foreground by the mountains, thereby providing a feeling of depth. It is turned away and facing to the left creating a perspective further removed from the viewer and forming a diagonal opposition to the direction of the fleeing crowd.

The effect of the light, which possibly indicates sunset, surrounds and highlights the clouds that encircle the giant's waist as described in Arriaza's poem:

Encircling its waist / clouds painted red by the western sun

— Juan Bautista Arriaza, Pyrenean Prophecy vv. 31–32.

This slanting light is fractured and interrupted by the mountain peaks increasing the sensation of disequilibrium and disorder. The effect is similar to Luis de Góngora's famous "dubious daylight" (Fable of Polyphemus and Galatea v. 72.). Instead of a centripetal composition where all the indications point towards a central nucleus, in this painting all the lines of movement shatter the unity of the image into multiple paths towards its margins. The painting can be considered to be an example of the many Romanticist paintings with an organic composition (in this case centrifugal), in relation to the movements and actions of the figures within the painting. This can be contrasted with the mechanical compositions found in Neoclassicism, where angular axes are formed by a painting's contents and imposed by the rational will of the painter.

== Attribution ==
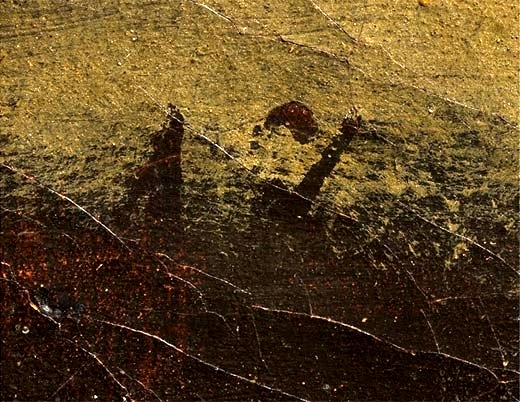
Brush strokes from the bottom left hand corner of The Colossus, which Nigel Glendinning identified as two numbers (17 or 18) from an inventory (that Jesusa Vega states in "The Colossus is by Francisco de Goya" 2012, is an 18) and Manuela Mena, at first identified, as the initials of Asensio Juliá (A. J.), even though in January 2009 she refused to state definitively that these strokes were the signature of the Valencian painter.

In June 2008 the Museo del Prado issued a press release in which Manuela Mena, Chief Curator of 18th-Century Painting and Goya, stated that the painting was "with almost complete certainty" the work of the painter Asensio Juliá who was a friend and collaborator of Goya. The analysis undertaken in January 2009 concluded that the painting was the work of one of Goya's disciples without being able to state for certain that this person was Juliá.

The Goya expert Nigel Glendinning rejects the idea that the picture was painted by Asensio Juliá, stating that the arguments supporting Mena's views are "totally subjective" and that the brush strokes that Mena claims are the signature "A. J." are actually the first digits of the inventory number 176 that is visible in old photographs of the painting. It is also possible to see other numbers in these old photographs such as the number 18 that is alluded to in the sentence "A giant with the number eighteen" used in a description of the painting A Giant which was the name used for the painting in the inventory of Goya's works carried out in 1812 after the death of the painter's wife Josefa Bayeu. In 2012 Jesusa Vega published an article entitled "The Colossus is by Francisco de Goya" in which she shows how the strokes of various figure eights drawn by Goya correspond to those visible on The Colossus. Vega rejects the basic premise that initially threw doubt on Goya's authorship of the painting. In addition, she shows that the other findings of the study carried out by the Prado have all indicated that the picture was painted by Goya; these included the analysis of pigments and binders, assessment of the artistic techniques used and the theme and composition of the painting along with its similarity to Goya's other Black Paintings. In 2009 the art historian Valeriano Bozal, after seeing Mena's press release, stated that "the report is not conclusive". He later unsuccessfully tried to hold a congress of international experts with the objective of arriving at a consensus, declaring in June 2010 that "Goya's authorship has been removed on the basis of weak irrelevant evidence. The heritage of the painting has been mutilated without conclusive evidence". Other scholars, restorers and former directors of the Prado have indicated that they disagree with Mena's hypothesis.

On the other side of the argument Manuela Mena refused to definitively conclude that the letters A. J. were the signature of Asensio Juliá, one of the main arguments supporting the attribution of the painting to the Valencian painter. In March 2009, Nigel Glendinning and Jesusa Vega published an article in the academic journal Goya entitled "A failed attempt to delist The Colossus by the Prado Museum?" in which they question the methodology and arguments of Mena's report:

In summary, the arguments in favour of delisting The Colossus put forward in the report are not only unconvincing but ultimately they are scandalous due to the errors made and the sophistry used. To publish a document of this type under the protection of the Prado, as if that institution had already accepted its conclusions, is a seriously misguided move that calls into question the trust that society places in the Museum.

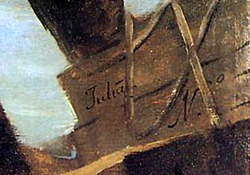
Signature of Asensio Juliá on El Náufrago (The Shipwreck)

Ever since 2001, Juliet Bareau-Wilson and Manuela Mena have questioned Goya's authorship of the painting, postulating that Goya's son, Javier, painted it. In addition, they attribute The Milkmaid of Bordeaux to the goddaughter of painter Rosarito Weiss. However, in an article entitled The problem of the allocations from the 1900 Goya Exposition Nigel Glendinning and the then-director of the Museo del Prado, Fernando Checa, reject these claims. In 2004 Nigel Glendinning also published an article entitled Goya's The Colossus and the patriotic poetry of its time, establishing the relationship between Goya's ideas regarding the giant represented in the picture and the literature that aroused patriotic fervour in a population that had survived the war provoked by Napoleon's invasion of Spain. This conjunction of ideas would not have existed if The Colossus had been painted later, which is an argument that Glendinning uses to refute Bareau-Wilson and Mena's hypothesis. This hypothesis tries to distance the painting from the inventory of the estate of Goya's wife, Josefa Bayeu, on her death in 1812. The inventory lists a painting with the same dimensions as The Colossus, which is called A Giant and which has traditionally been identified as the same painting.

In July 2009 Spanish universities and numerous Goya experts signed a declaration in support of Nigel Glendinning, defending the use of the scientific method in the study of art history and attributing The Colossus to Goya.

In 2021, the Prado Museum changed its position and declared that the painting is attributed back to Goya.

== See also ==
- List of works by Francisco Goya
- 100 Great Paintings, 1980 BBC series

== Notes and sources ==
Notes

Sources

- ABC (Madrid), "El Prado anuncia pruebas de que "El Coloso" no es de Goya, sino de Asensio Juliá", 24-06-2008.
- ARRIAZA, Juan Bautista, "Profecía del Pirineo", en Poesías patrióticas, London, T. Bensley, 1810, pages 27-40.
- BBC NEWS World Edition, "Museum rejects Goya claims", 05-04-2001.
- GLENDINNING, Nigel, Francisco de Goya, Madrid, Cuadernos de Historia 16 (col. "El arte y sus creadores", nº 30), 1993, pages 88–89 and details of the painting on page 140.
- — "El problema de las atribuciones desde la Exposición Goya de 1900", Goya 1900, Madrid, Dirección General de Bellas Artes y Bienes Culturales-Instituto de Patrimonio Histórico Español, 2002, pages 15–37. Catálogo ilustrado y estudio de la exposición en el Ministerio de Instrucción Pública y Bellas Artes I.
- — "El Coloso de Goya y la poesía patriótica de su tiempo", Dieciocho: Hispanic Enlightenment, 22-03-2004.
- LUNA, Juan J., "El coloso" [en línea], in Catálogo de la exposición celebrada en el Museo de Zaragoza del 3 de octubre al 1 de diciembre de 1996, nº 43: El coloso. Quoted on the webpage Realidad e imagen: Goya 1746 - 1828 (url <http://www.almendron.com/arte/pintura/goya/obras_goya/obras_goya.htm>) [Consulta: 15-06-2007].
- HAGEN, Rose-Marie and HAGEN, Rainer, Francisco de Goya, Colonia, Taschen, 2003. ISBN 3-8228-2296-5
- VEGA, Jesusa, "La técnica artística como método de conocimiento, a propósito de El Coloso de Goya", en Goya: Revista de arte, No. 324, 2008, pages 229-244. ISSN 0017-2715.
- — "El Coloso es de Francisco de Goya", Artes y Letras, suplemento de Heraldo de Aragón, 19 January 2012.
