= Peckover =

Peckover is a surname. Notable people with the surname include:

- Alexander Peckover, 1st Baron Peckover (1830–1919), British Quaker banker, philanthropist and collector of ancient manuscripts
- Gerald Peckover (born 1955), Zimbabwean cricketer
- Priscilla Hannah Peckover (1833–1931), English Quaker, pacifist and linguist
- Richard Peckover (1942–2005), British nuclear physicists

== See also ==
- Peckover House & Garden, is a National Trust property located in North Brink, Wisbech, Cambridgeshire, England.
