= Asensio Julià =

Spanish painter

Portraits of Julià by Goya

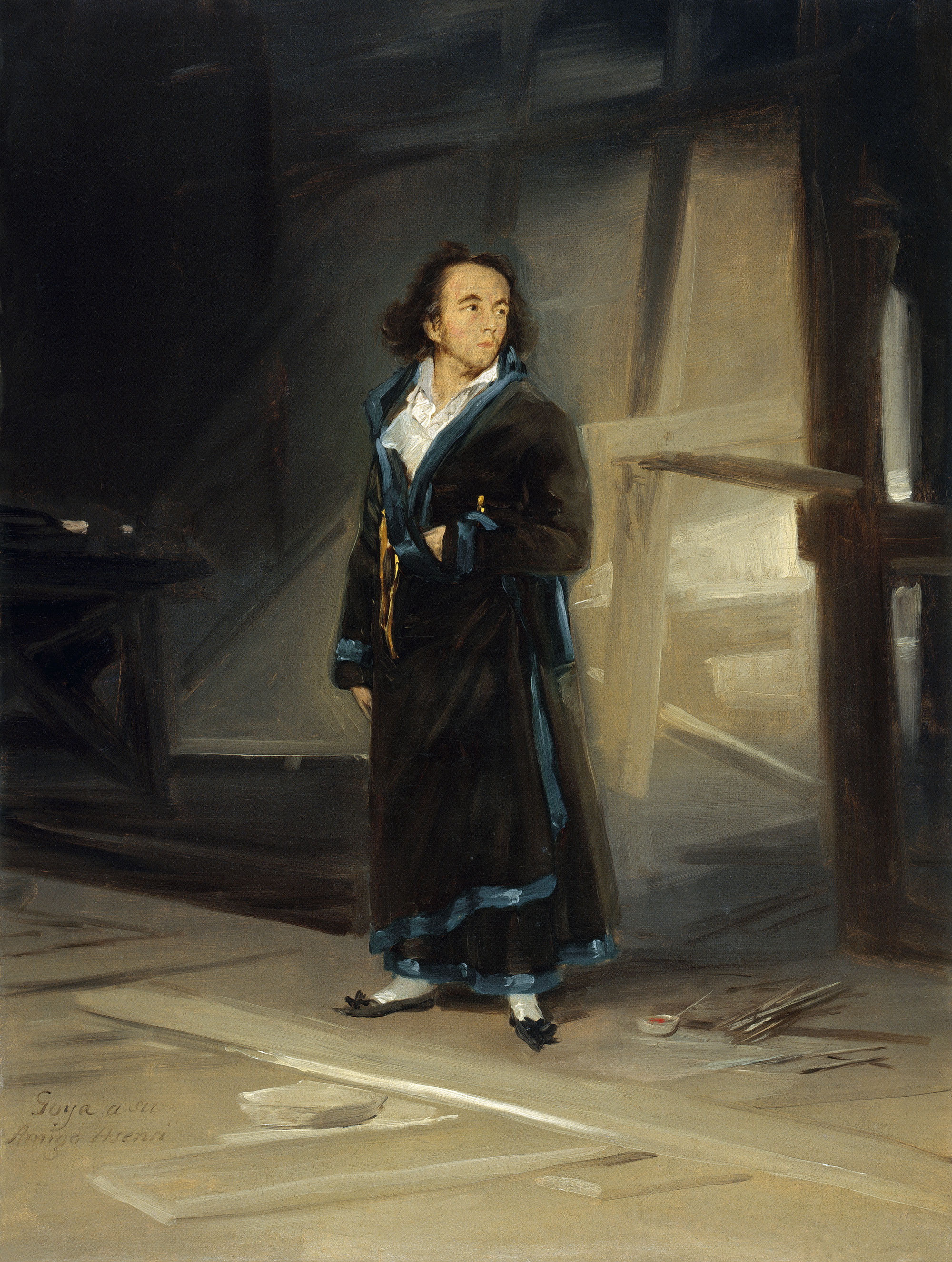
1798

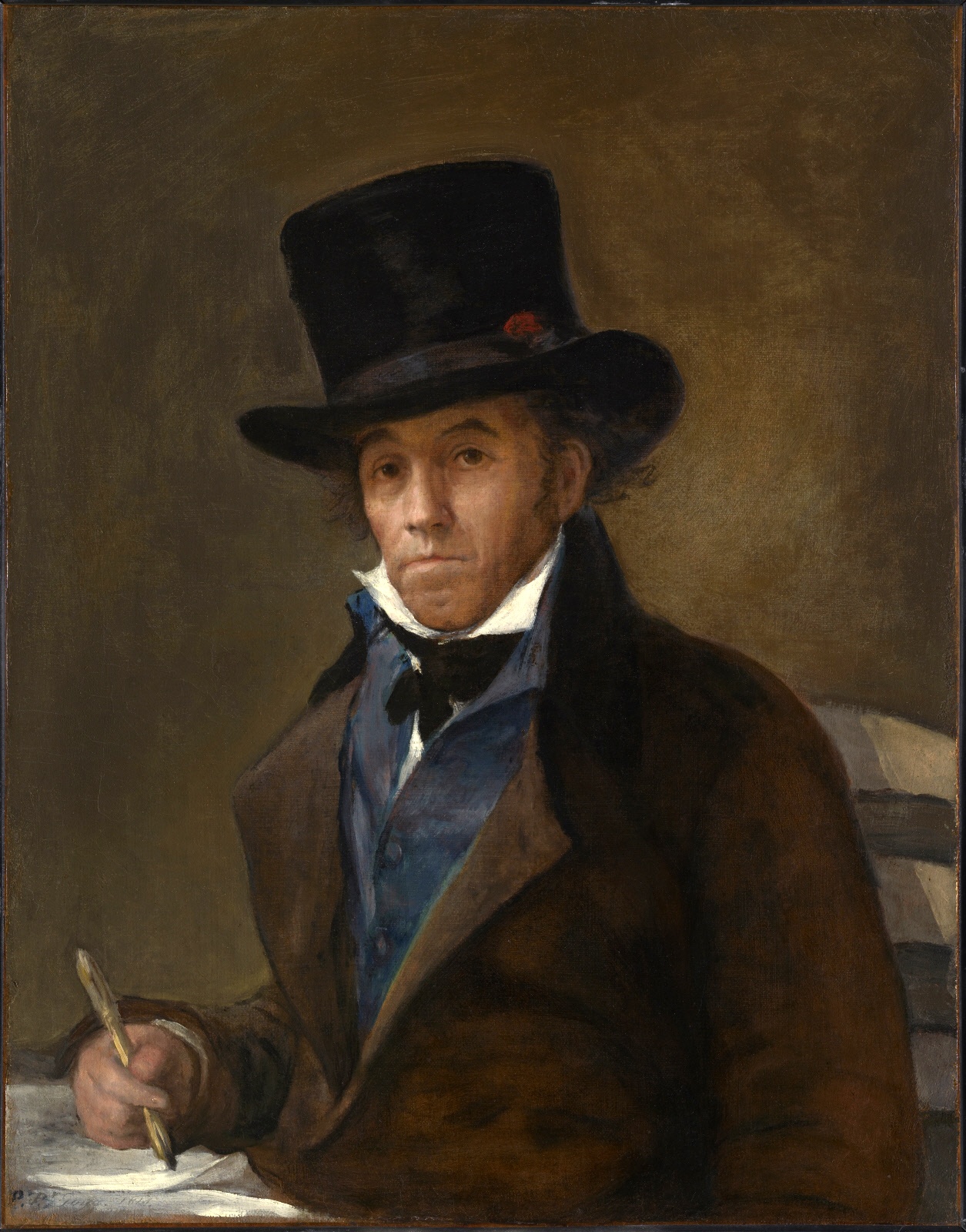
1814

Asensio Julià i Alvarracín, nicknamed El Pescadoret, the Little Fisherman (c.1759/60 – 22 February or 25 October 1832) was a Spanish painter and engraver who was closely associated with Francisco de Goya.

== Biography ==
He was born in the seaside barrio of Cañamelar and was apparently the son of a fisherman, so he was given the nickname "El Pescadoret"; although this has been brought into question by later research.

In 1771, at the age of eleven, he entered the Real Academia de San Carlos and studied there until 1775. When he turned 19, he spent almost two years fighting the Barbary Pirates along the coast of North Africa until he had to return to Spain because an illness had left him deaf.

Later, he moved to Madrid, where he worked with Mariano Salvador Maella and was briefly introduced to Goya. In 1783, he became a teacher at the Escuela Real de la Merced, a satellite school of the Real Academia de Bellas Artes de San Fernando, and applied to continue his studies at the Academia. (In 1818, he became Director of the Escuela.)

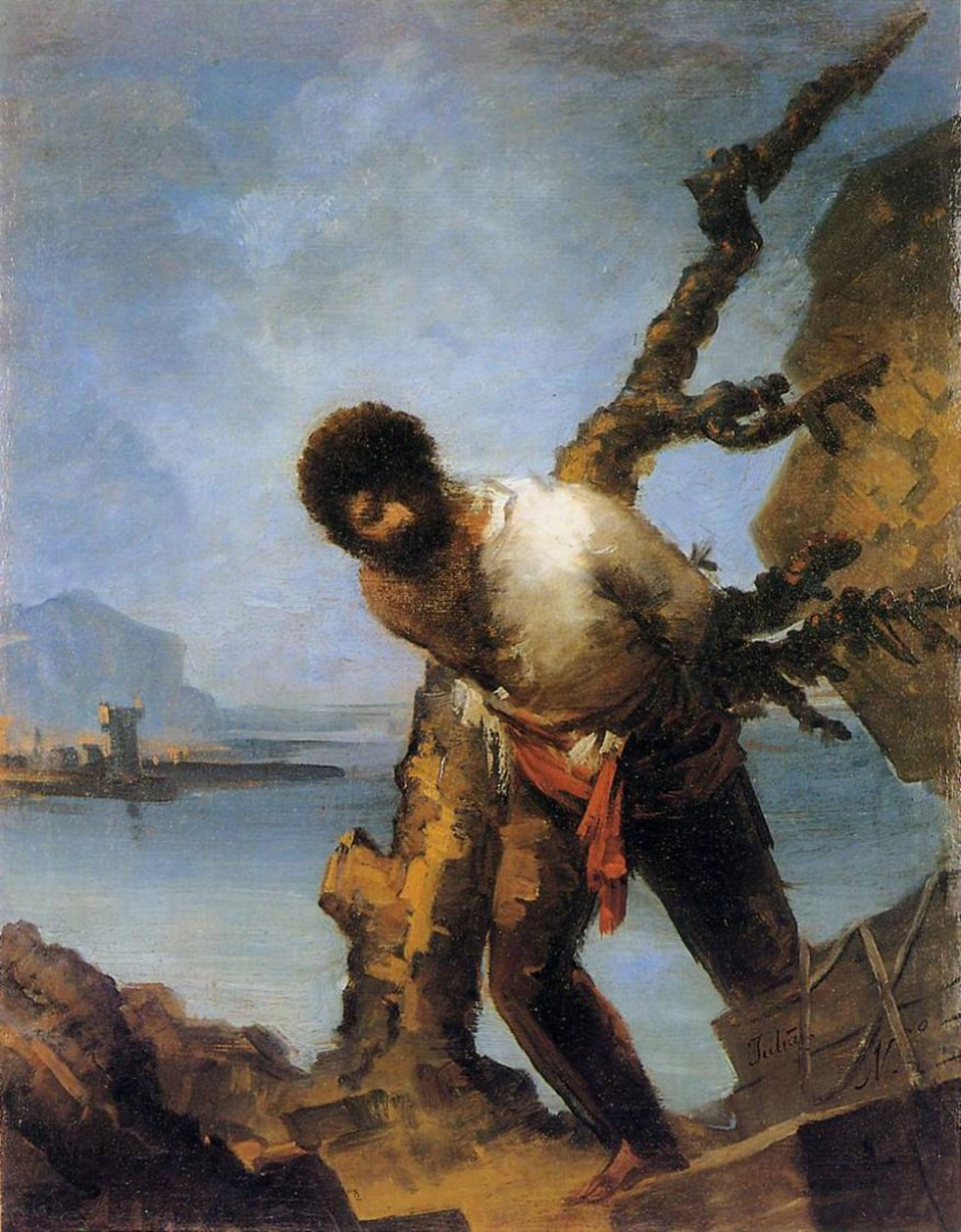
The Castaway, once attributed to Goya

Little more is known of personal life at that time, except that, in 1790, he was living in his old neighborhood in Valencia, near the home of the Marqués de La Romana, to whom he had offered his services, and where Goya had come to recover from a spell of ill health. According to a letter from Goya to his friend Martín Zapater, this is where they first became acquainted when Julià sought Goya's recommendation as a mutual friend of Maella. At this time, Goya was becoming deaf, so this may have helped form a sympathetic bond between them.

In 1798, Goya received a major commission to create frescoes in the Royal Chapel of St. Anthony of La Florida, but his health continued to be unstable and he sometimes employed Julià as an assistant. A portrait by Goya indicates that the two were in contact until at least 1814.

Apparently, he was a man of little ambition; satisfied with whatever orders he received from the local bourgeoisie. The number of his confirmed paintings is rather small; mostly of a military or allegorical nature. His painting, The Castaway (also called The Smuggler) was attributed to Goya until the early twentieth century; complicated by the fact that he was known to have made copies of Goya's works. Some of his paintings were made into engravings by Rafael Esteve, who had also worked with Goya.

Apparently, he was never married and had no children. Online sources give his birth year as early as 1746, or as late as 1767. His place of death is generally given as Madrid, although this is not firmly established. A few sources give his year of death as 1816.

In 2008, Manuela Mena, Chief Curator at the Museo del Prado issued a press release asserting that The Colossus, an iconic work by Goya, was actually the work of Julià. After a year's worth of international controversy, the issue was decided in favor of Goya. (For an exhaustive discussion of the subject, with references, see "Attribution" in the painting's article). A major retrospective of his work was presented by the Ministry of Culture of Valencia in 2010.

== Selected works ==
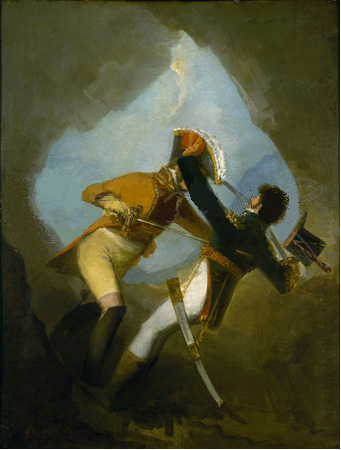
The Duel

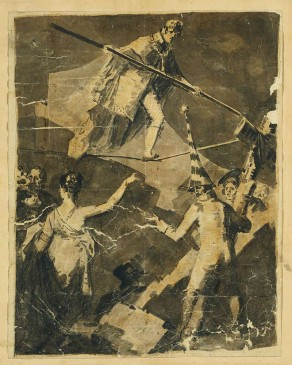
King Fernando VII on a Tightrope

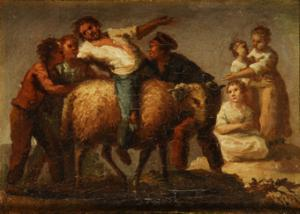
Children Playing with a Ram

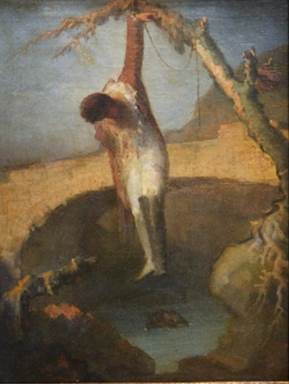
The Executed One

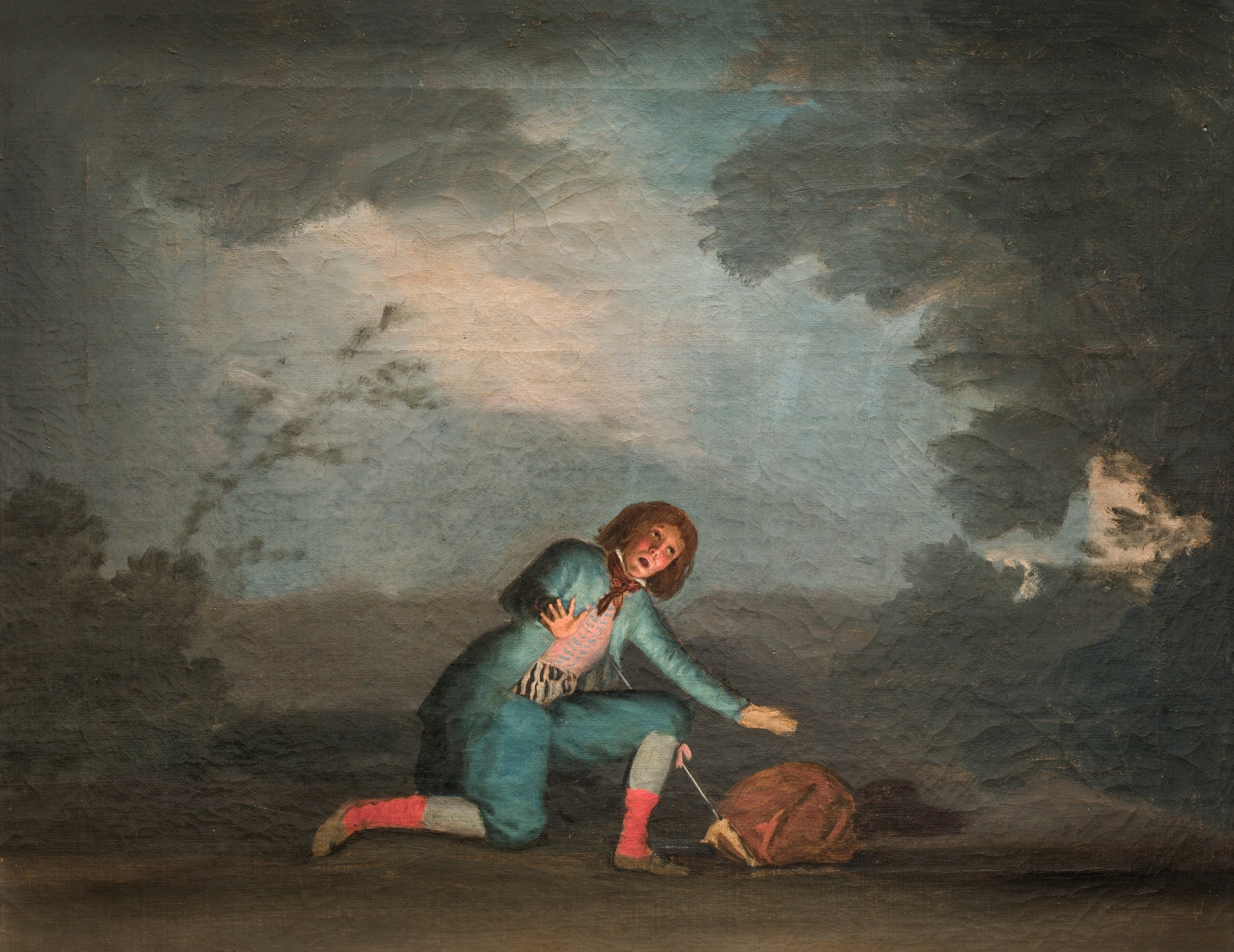
Scene from a Comedy
