= Nigel Weiss =

Professor of mathematics and astronomy (1936–2020)

- Born: Nigel Oscar Weiss; 16 December 1936; South Africa
- Died: 24 June 2020 (aged 83)
- Education: Clare College, Cambridge
- Known for: flux expulsion
- Awards: FRS (1992); Gold Medal of the Royal Astronomical Society (2007)
- Scientific career
- Workplaces: University of Cambridge
- Thesis: Variable Hydromagnetic Motions (1961)
- Doctoral advisor: Edward Bullard
- Doctoral students: Paul Glendinning; Vivien Kirk; Richard Peckover; Mike Tildesley
- Website: Nigel Weiss's home page

Nigel Oscar Weiss FRS (16 December 1936 – 24 June 2020) was an astronomer and mathematician, and leader in the field of astrophysical and geophysical fluid dynamics. He was emeritus professor of mathematical astrophysics at the University of Cambridge.

== Education ==
Born in South Africa, Weiss studied at Hilton College, Natal, Rugby School and Clare College, Cambridge, and had been a fellow of Clare College since 1965. He read for his PhD in 1961 with a thesis on Variable Hydromagnetic Motions.

== Career ==
In 1987 he became Professor of Mathematical Astrophysics at the University of Cambridge.

Between 2000 and 2002 he was President of the Royal Astronomical Society, and in 2007 was awarded the Gold Medal, the society's highest award.

== Research ==
Weiss published extensively in the field of mathematical astrophysics, specialising in solar and stellar magnetic fields, astrophysical and geophysical fluid dynamics and nonlinear dynamical systems.

In 1966 he was the first to demonstrate and describe the process of 'flux expulsion' by which a conducting fluid undergoing rotating motion acts to expel the magnetic flux from the region of motion, a process now known to occur in the photosphere of the Sun and other stars.

== Awards and honours ==
Weiss was elected a Fellow of the Royal Society (FRS) in 1992. His nomination reads

Professor Weiss is distinguished for his work in the theory of convection, for developing appropriate numerical techniques, and for pioneering their use in precise numerical experiments to gain a qualitative and comprehensive understanding of the behaviour of complicated nonlinear systems. Among many notable achievements in this field, he has been instrumental in the identification of a period-doubling route to chaos in a system of partial differential equations describing doubly-diffusive convection. He has made wide-ranging studies of the magneto-convective processes occurring in the Sun and similar stars. In early work of lasting influence, he analysed the process of magnetic flux expulsion and the mechanism of concentration of magnetic field into ropes from which fluid motion is excluded. In recent work, he has initiated a program of research in the field of nonlinear compressible convection, an important step towards realistic modelling of stellar convection zones.

The Weiss Building (2021), comprising accommodation for students of Clare College as part of its St Regis site is named in honour of Weiss and his wife.
