= Royal Chapel of St. Anthony of La Florida =

- Ermita de San Antonio de la Florida (Spanish)
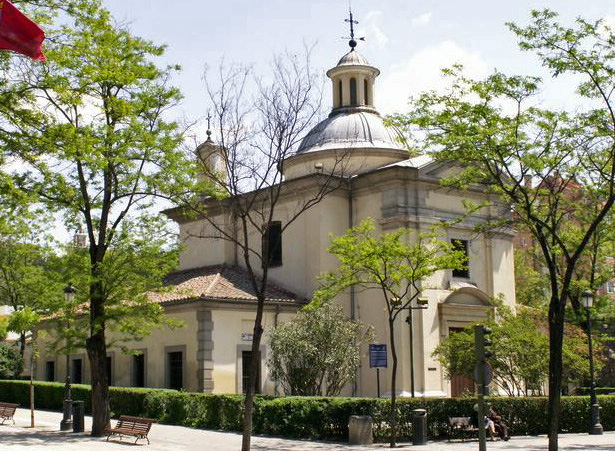

- Location within Spain
- 40.425363°N 3.725597°W
- Location: Madrid, Spain

Site notes
- Governing body: City Council of Madrid
- Owner: Patrimonio Nacional

Spanish Cultural Heritage
- Official name: Ermita de San Antonio de la Florida
- Type: Non-movable
- Criteria: Monument
- Designated: 1905
- Reference no.: RI-51-0000088

The Royal Chapel of St. Anthony of La Florida (Spanish: Real Ermita de San Antonio de la Florida) is a Neoclassical chapel in central Madrid. The chapel is best known for its ceiling and dome frescoes by Francisco Goya. It is also his final burial place.

== History ==
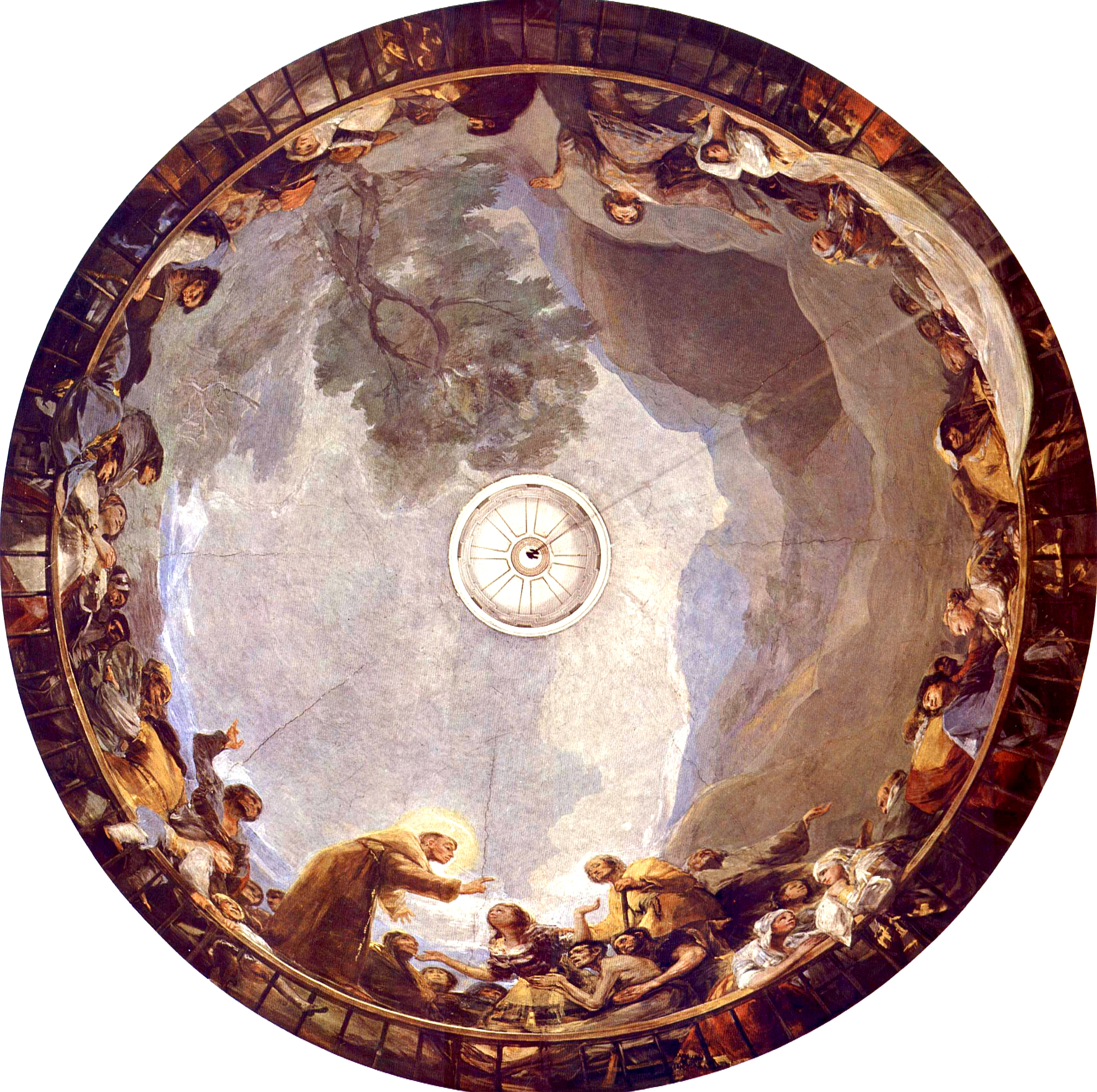
Goya's fresco depicting the legend of Saint Anthony reviving a dead man

The chapel was built in the general location of two prior chapels built in the 1730s, which were on the land of a farm called La Florida. The present structure was built by Felipe Fontana from 1792 to 1798 on the orders of King Carlos IV, who also commissioned the frescoes by Goya and his assistant Asensio Juliá.

The structure was declared a national monument in 1905. In 1919 Goya's remains were transferred here from Bordeaux, where he had died in 1828. Famously, the skull was missing, a detail the Spanish consul had immediately advised to his superiors in Madrid, who wired back, "Send Goya, with or without head." In 1928 an identical chapel was built alongside the original, in order to allow the original to be converted into a museum, and the headless remains were moved again.

On every June 13, the chapel becomes the site of a lively pilgrimage in which young unwed women come to pray to Saint Anthony and to ask for a partner.

== Frescoes ==
The frescoes by Goya were completed over a six-month period in 1798. The frescoes portray miracles by Saint Anthony of Padua. On the main cupola of the chapel Goya depicted Saint Anthony raising a man from the dead and exculpating his father, who had been falsely accused of his murder. Instead of portraying the scene as occurring in thirteenth-century Lisbon, Goya relocated the miracle to contemporary Madrid.

== See also ==
- Catholic Church in Spain
- List of oldest church buildings
- 18th-century Western domes
