= Simon Glendinning =

English philosopher

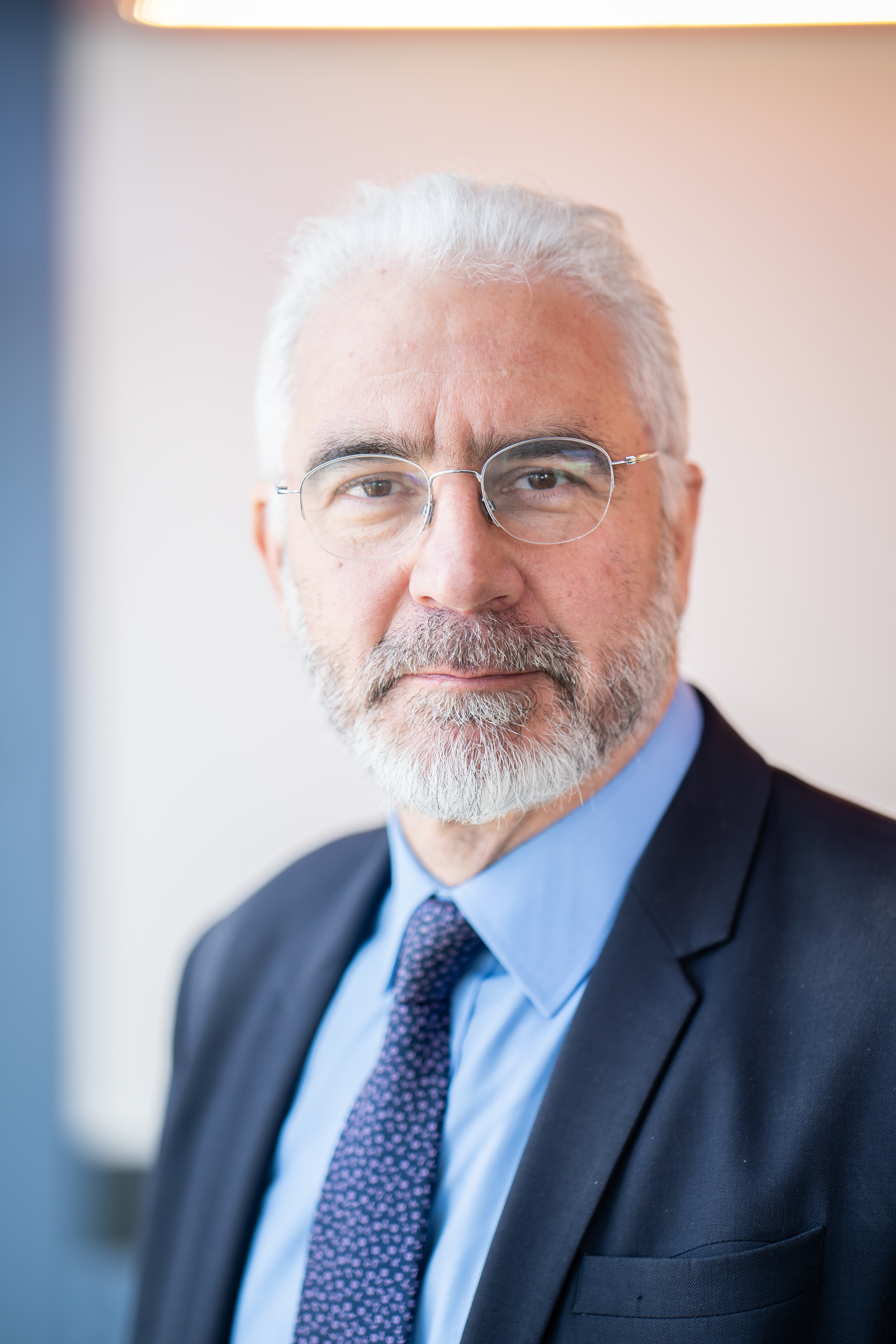
- Born: 13 December 1964 (age 61)

Education
- Education: University of Oxford; University of York

Philosophical work
- Era: 21st-century philosophy
- Region: Western philosophy
- School: "Continental" philosophy, phenomenology, deconstruction
- Institutions: University of Kent; University of Reading; London School of Economics
- Main interests: European philosophy
- Notable ideas: "Philosophy of Europe"

Simon Glendinning (born 1964) is an English philosopher. Glendinning is Professor of European Philosophy and Head of department in the European Institute at the London School of Economics.

== Academic career ==
Glendinning studied philosophy at the University of Oxford and at the University of York, since which he has held a series of positions:

- 1993–1997: Lecturer, Department of Philosophy, University of Kent
- 1997–2004: Senior Lecturer, Department of Philosophy, University of Reading
- 2004–2013: Reader in European Philosophy, European Institute, LSE
- 2014–present: Professor of European Philosophy, European Institute, LSE

== Philosophical work ==
Glendinning's work is characterised by the way in which it engages with thinkers and themes from both the 'analytic' and 'continental' traditions in philosophy. His first book, On Being With Others: Heidegger-Wittgenstein-Derrida, is an analysis of the problem of other minds. His later writings are largely concerned with the phenomenological tradition in philosophy. In the Name of Phenomenology is a detailed study of that tradition. The Idea of Continental Philosophy is a critique of the contemporary division between ‘analytic’ and ‘continental’ philosophy, and argues that phenomenological philosophy, in particular, should not be conceived as an exclusively ‘continental’ tradition. In 2011 he published Derrida: A Very Short Introduction. However, most of his work since 2007 has involved a turn from European Philosophy towards the Philosophy of Europe. In 2021 he published a two-volume study in the Philosophy of Europe, entitled Europe: A Philosophical History.

In January 2015, Glendinning was a guest on BBC Radio 4's In Our Time, which discussed phenomenology.

== Family ==
His father was the Goya specialist, Nigel Glendinning. His mother is the author, Victoria Glendinning. He is the youngest of four brothers. The eldest, Paul Glendinning, is a mathematician at the University of Manchester. The second is the photographer, Hugo Glendinning and the third is a sports journalist, Matthew Glendinning. He lives in Oxford in Oxfordshire with his wife, the writer Anjali Joseph.

== Published books ==
Glendinning has authored and edited the following books:

As author

- 2021: Europe: A Philosophical History, Part 1. The Promise of Modernity, Abingdon: Routledge
- 2021: Europe: A Philosophical History, Part 2. Beyond Modernity, Abingdon: Routledge
- 2011: Derrida: A Very Short Introduction, Oxford: Oxford University Press
- 2007: In the Name of Phenomenology, Abingdon: Routledge
- 2006: Author, The Idea of Continental Philosophy, Edinburgh: Edinburgh University Press
- 1998: On Being with Others: Heidegger-Derrida-Wittgenstein, London: Routledge

As editor

- 2008: Derrida's Legacies: Literature and Philosophy, Abingdon: Routledge, (with Robert Eaglestone, includes essay as "Preface")
- 2001: Arguing with Derrida, Oxford: Blackwell, (including essay: "Inheriting Philosophy: The Case of Austin and Derrida")
- 1999: The Edinburgh Encyclopædia of Continental Philosophy, Edinburgh: EUP, (including introduction: "What is Continental Philosophy")
