= Alona Ben-Tal =

Israeli and New Zealand applied mathematician

- אלונה בן טל
- Education: Technion – Israel Institute of Technology, University of Auckland
- Known for: Mathematical modeling of human and bird breathing, electrical power systems
- Awards: Fellow of the New Zealand Mathematical Society (2016)
- Scientific career
- Fields: Applied Mathematics
- Workplaces: Massey University
- Doctoral advisor: Vivien Kirk, Graeme Wake, Geoff Nicholls

Alona Ben-Tal (Hebrew: אלונה בן טל) is an Israeli and New Zealand applied mathematician who works as an associate professor and deputy head of school in the School of Natural and Computational Sciences at Massey University. Her research concerns dynamical systems and the mathematical modeling of human and bird breathing and of electrical power systems.

== Education and career ==
Ben-Tal originally studied mechanical engineering at the Technion – Israel Institute of Technology, earning a bachelor's degree there in 1991 and a master's degree in 1994. After working in industry for three years, she moved with her family to New Zealand and returned to graduate study in mathematics, completing a Ph.D. in 2001 at the University of Auckland with the dissertation A Study of Symmetric Forced Oscillators supervised by Vivien Kirk, Graeme Wake and Geoff Nicholls.

After she completed her doctorate, she held positions at the University of Auckland as a fixed-term lecturer in mathematics, and then as a NZ Science & Technology post-doctoral fellow in the Bioengineering Institute, before moving to Massey University as a lecturer in 2005.

== Contributions ==
In her work on human breathing, Ben-Tal has studied respiratory sinus arrhythmia, the phenomenon that the heart rate speeds up while inhaling and slows down while exhaling. Initially hypothesising that this variability would improve the rate of gas exchange in the lungs, her research found that instead it saves effort by the heart while maintaining even levels of blood oxygenation.

In birds, Ben-Tal has studied the one-way nature of certain air passages in bird lungs, and the ability of birds to change the speed of airflow through these passages. Her research found that, in some circumstances, birds spend less time inhaling than they do exhaling.

== Recognition ==
Ben-Tal was named a fellow of the New Zealand Mathematical Society in 2016.
