= Terence de Vere White =

Irish writer, literary editor, and lawyer

Terence de Vere White (29 April 1912 – 17 June 1994) was an Irish lawyer, writer and editor.

== Life ==
=== Career ===
Born in Dublin, de Vere White studied at Trinity College, Dublin. He later qualified as a solicitor and became a partner at a leading Dublin law firm. He gave up law when he became the literary editor of The Irish Times, a post he held from 1961 to 1977.

Writing in 1968, he harshly criticized both the Constitution of Ireland and the existing political system, "At the time of this writing, the Constitution of the Republic is under scrutiny, but it is unlikely that any proposed changes therein will radically alter the system established. A Constitution on the United States model might well suit the people better than the present one; but the Irish are too innately Conservative ever to bring about such a change except by gradual and almost imperceptible degrees."

He retired from the newspaper in 1977.

He wrote twelve novels, five biographies, two volumes of short stories and five other books of general interest.

=== Personal life ===
de Vere White married Mary O'Farrell in 1941 and they had two sons and a daughter. He was also the father of Dervla Murphy's daughter, born in 1968.

At the time of his death, he was married to Victoria Glendinning.

== Selected works ==
- The Road of Excess (1945) - biography of Isaac Butt
- Kevin O'Higgins (1948)
- The Story of the Royal Dublin Society (1955)
- A Fretful Midge (1957) - memoirs
- An Affair With the Moon (1959) - novel
- Prenez Garde (1961) - novel
- The Remainder Man (1963) - novel
- Lucifer Falling (1966) - novel
- Tara (1967) - novel
- The Parents of Oscar Wilde: Sir William and Lady Wilde (1967)
- Leinster (1968)
- Ireland (1968) - "New Nations & Peoples" series
- The Lambert Mile (1969) - novel
- The Lambert Revels (1969) - novel
- The March Hare (1970) - novel
- The Minister for Justice (1971) - novel
- Mr. Stephen (1971) - novel
- The Anglo-Irish (1972)
- After Sunset (1973) - play
- The Distance and the Dark (1973) - novel
- The Radish Memoirs (1974) - novel
- The Real Charlotte (1975) - play
- Chimes at Midnight and Other Stories (1977) - fiction
- Tom Moore: The Irish Poet (1977)
- My Name is Norval (1979) - novel
- Birds of Prey: Stories (1980) - fiction
- Johnnie Cross (1983) - novel about George Eliot
- Chat Show (1987) - novel
