= José de Vargas Ponce =

The Most Excellent José de Vargas
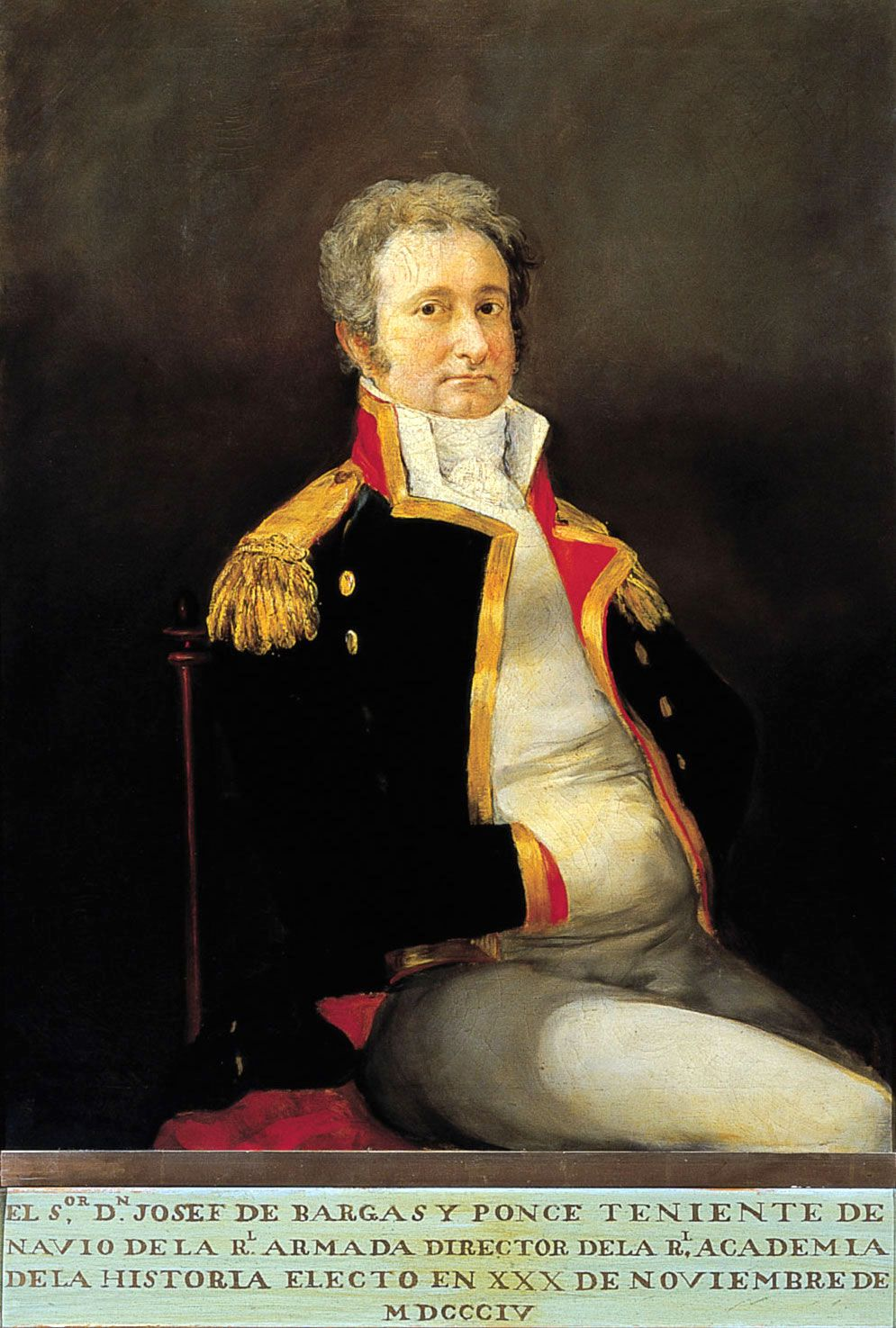
- Portrait by Goya, 1805
- Born: José de Vargas Ponce; 10 June 1760; Cádiz, Spain
- Died: 6 February 1821 (aged 60); Madrid, Spain

Seat K of the Real Academia Española
- In office March 1814 – 6 February 1821
- Preceded by: Antonio de Porlier
- Succeeded by: Juan Bautista Arriaza

José de Vargas Ponce (Cádiz, 10 June 1760 – 6 February 1821) was a Spanish erudite, satirical poet and writer.

He was elected to seat K of the Real Academia Española, he took up his seat in March 1814.

== Works ==
- Praise of Alfonso the Wise, 1782.
- Descriptions of the Islands and Balearic Pithiusas, 1787.
- Relation of the last voyage to the Strait of Magellan, 1788 (and Appendix to the Relation, 1793).
- Declamation on abuses introduced into the Castilian, presented and awarded at the Spanish Academy, 1791.
- Proclamation of a bachelor, 1827, burlesque poem in octaves.
- Dissertation on bullfighting, written in 1807 and published in London, by the Royal Academy of History in 1961.
- Description of Cartagena, Murcia, 1978
- Lucio Marineo Siculus Life
- Abdalaziz and Egilona, neoclassical tragedy.
