= Paul Glendinning =

British mathematician

- Born: Paul Alexander Glendinning
- Education: King's College, Cambridge
- Awards: Adams Prize (1992)
- Scientific career
- Fields: Non-linear dynamics
- Workplaces: University of Warwick; University of Manchester; UMIST; Queen Mary University of London: University of Cambridge
- Thesis: Homoclinic Bifurcations (1985)
- Doctoral advisor: Nigel Weiss
- Website: www.maths.manchester.ac.uk/~pag; www.manchester.ac.uk/research/paul.glendinning

Paul Glendinning is a Beyer professor of applied mathematics, in the Department of Mathematics at the University of Manchester who is known for his work on dynamical systems, specifically models of the time-evolution of complex mathematical or physical processes. His main areas of research are bifurcation theory (particularly global bifurcations); synchronization and blowout bifurcations; low-dimensional maps; and quasi-periodically forced systems.

== Education ==
He gained his PhD from King's College, Cambridge in 1985 with a thesis entitled Homoclinic Bifurcations under the supervision of Nigel Weiss.

== Career and research ==
After postdoctoral research at the University of Warwick, he returned to Cambridge, with a Junior Research Fellowship at King's. In 1987 he moved to Gonville and Caius College, Cambridge as Director of Studies in Applied Mathematics. In 1992 he won the Adams Prize. In 1996 he was appointed to a chair at Queen Mary and Westfield College, London and then to a chair at the University of Manchester Institute of Science and Technology (UMIST) in 2000.

In 2004 the Victoria University of Manchester and UMIST merged and he was appointed as head of the School of Mathematics formed by the merger of the Mathematics Departments in the former institutions. His term of office as head of school expired in August 2008.

He was Scientific Director of the International Centre for Mathematical Sciences in Edinburgh from 2016 to 2021. In 2021 he was elected a Fellow of the Royal Society of Edinburgh.

He is on the editorial board of the European Journal of Applied Mathematics and the journal Dynamical Systems.

Glendinning was appointed president of the Institute of Mathematics and its Applications in January 2022

== Personal life ==
Glendinning lives in Marsden, West Yorkshire as of 2012. He is the son of the academic Nigel Glendinning and the writer and broadcaster Victoria Glendinning. His brother is the philosopher Simon Glendinning.
