= Mike Tildesley =

Researcher

Michael J. Tildesley is professor in infectious disease modelling at the University of Warwick. He is a member of the Scientific Pandemic Influenza Modelling group (SPI-M) of SAGE.

== Education ==
Born in Keighley, West Yorkshire, Tildesley went to school in the city of York and studied mathematics at Clare College, Cambridge. He read for his Ph.D. in 2003 with a thesis on Astrophysical Fluid Dynamics under the supervision of Nigel Weiss. He later moved to the University of Warwick and transitioned into the field of infectious disease modeling, a field he has worked in ever since.

== Research ==
Tildesley's main area of research is the development of mathematical models to simulate the spread of livestock and zoonotic diseases. He has a particular interest in the targeting of control in the event of an outbreak to minimize the spread of disease.

In 2021, he was quoted as the Lead Researcher for research by the University of Warwick. The research found that children returning to the classroom was not a significant driver of outbreaks in the community.
