= Vivien Kirk =

New Zealand mathematician

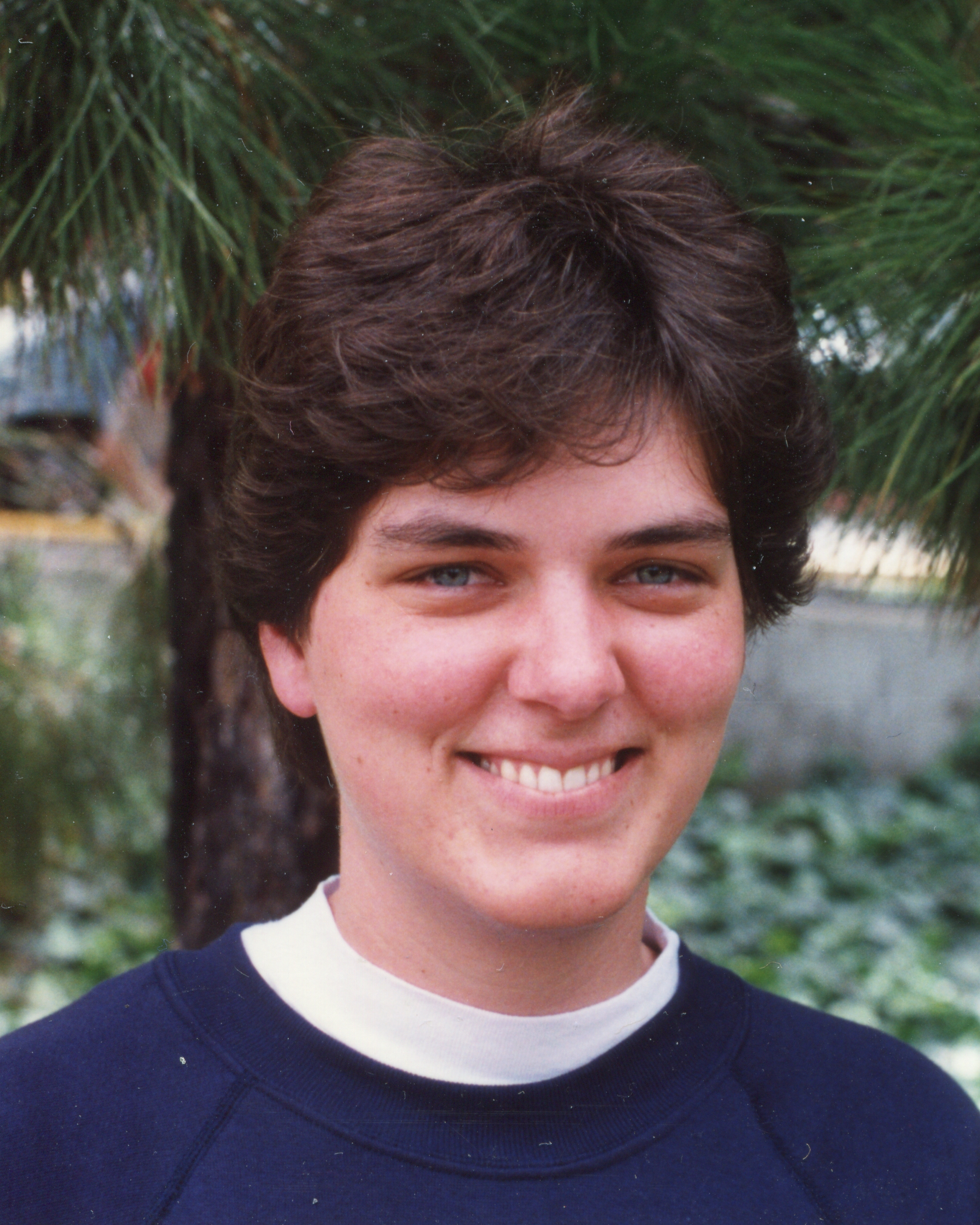
- Vivien Kirk in 1990

Academic background
- Education: University of Auckland; University of Cambridge
- Doctoral advisor: Nigel Weiss

Academic work
- Doctoral students: Alona Ben-Tal

Vivien Kirk is a New Zealand mathematician who studies dynamical systems. She is a professor of mathematics at the University of Auckland, where she also serves as associate pro-vice chancellor graduate research, and was president of the New Zealand Mathematical Society for 2017–2019.

== Education and career ==
After earning bachelor's and master's degrees at the University of Auckland, Kirk went to the University of Cambridge for doctoral studies. She completed her Ph.D. in 1990; her dissertation, Destruction of tori in dissipative flows, was supervised by Nigel Weiss.

She was a postdoctoral researcher at the University of California, Berkeley and at the California Institute of Technology. Kirk's notable students include Alona Ben-Tal.

== Books ==
Kirk is the co-author of the books Mathematical Analysis of Complex Cellular Activity (Springer, 2015) and Models of Calcium Signalling (Springer, 2016).

== Recognition ==
In 2017, Kirk won the Miriam Dell Excellence in Science Mentoring Award of New Zealand's Association for Women in the Sciences, in part for her efforts in founding and running a series of annual workshops for young women in mathematics and physics since 2007.
