= Victoria Glendinning =

British biographer and novelist (born 1937)

Victoria Glendinning (née Seebohm; born 23 April 1937) is a British biographer, critic, broadcaster and novelist. She is an honorary vice-president of English PEN and vice-president of the Royal Society of Literature. She won the James Tait Black Memorial Prize and the Whitbread Prize for biography.

== Early life and education ==
She was born in Sheffield, England, to a Quaker family. Her father was the banker Frederic Seebohm (created a life peer as Baron Seebohm in April 1972), and her great-grandfather was the economic historian, also called Frederic Seebohm. Her mother was clever, "but she never did anything with it, except wait for my father to come home", Glendinning said in a 1999 interview.

Her sister is Caroline Seebohm, an American biographer.

Glendinning grew up near York and, after being privately educated at Millfield School in Somerset, went up to Somerville College, Oxford, to read Modern Languages.

== Awards and honours ==
Glendinning is the only person to have won the Whitbread Prize (now the Costa Book Award) for biography twice, for her works on Vita Sackville-West (1983) and Anthony Trollope (1992). She won the James Tait Black Memorial Prize in 1981 for her biography of Edith Sitwell. She was elected a Fellow of the Royal Society of Literature in 1982.

She was appointed Commander of the Order of the British Empire (CBE) in 1998. She was awarded an honorary doctorate by Trinity College Dublin in 1995 and by the University of York in 2000.

== Marriages and children ==
In the second year of her degree course, in 1958, she married one of her Spanish lecturers, Nigel Glendinning. They divorced in 1981. Her second husband, Terence de Vere White, father of Dervla Murphy's only child, died of Parkinson's disease in 1994. In 1996, she married Kevin O'Sullivan, who had previously been married to Shirley Conran. She had four sons before she was 28: sportswriter Matthew Glendinning, with whom she coauthored the book Sons and Mothers; mathematician Paul Glendinning; philosopher Simon Glendinning; and photographer and artist Hugo Glendinning. She sent her children to the local state school.

== Selected publications ==
- A Suppressed Cry: Life and Death of a Quaker Daughter, 1969, Routledge & Kegan Paul
- Elizabeth Bowen: Portrait of a Writer, 1977, Weidenfeld & Nicolson
- Edith Sitwell: A Unicorn Among Lions, 1981, Weidenfeld & Nicolson
- Vita: The Life of Vita Sackville-West, 1983, Weidenfeld & Nicolson
- Rebecca West: A Life, 1987, Weidenfeld & Nicolson
- The Grown-Ups, 1989, Hutchinson (a novel)
- Trollope, 1992, Hutchinson
- Electricity, 1995, Hutchinson (a novel)
- Sons and Mothers (co-editor with Matthew Glendinning) 1996, Virago, ISBN 1860492541
- Jonathan Swift, 1998, Hutchinson
- The Weekenders (contributor), 2001, Ebury (from a short visit to Sudan)
- Flight, 2002, Scribner
- Leonard Woolf: A Biography, 2006, Simon & Schuster
- Cousin Rosamund by Rebecca West (Victoria Glendinning wrote the Afterword)
- Love's Civil War: Elizabeth Bowen and Charles Ritchie: Letters and Diaries, 1941–1973 (co-editor with Judith Robertson) 2009, Simon & Schuster
- Raffles and the Golden Opportunity, 2012, Profile Books Ltd.
- The Butcher's Daughter, 2018, Duckworth Overlook (a novel centered on the dissolution of Shaftesbury Abbey in the 1530s)
- "John Lewis: How the partnership grew out of poverty, violence and a family feud". Express, August 18, 2021

=== Critical studies and reviews ===
- Madden, Paul (April 2013). "Raffles' prize". Australian Book Review. 350: 46. Review of Raffles and the golden opportunity.
