= Prenez Garde =

1961 novel by Terence de Vere White

First edition (publ. Gollancz)

Prenez Garde is a 1961 novel by Terence de Vere White.

Prenez Garde is about a nine-year-old boy who lives in a middle-class Irish family. However, due to the conflict throughout Ireland, life is not as simple as it once was. He is an only child and has a fetish for older woman. His parents worry about their boy being exposed to the outside world and so he has never been to school and learns from a beautiful, if not fully qualified, governess. Of course, living where they do at the time, makes it difficult for them to protect him from talk of the IRA and the Black and Tans. So, in an effort to avoid this talk whenever they discuss such matters, they lapse into French. Unfortunately, this doesn't quite work and in the boy's desire to learn more, he ends up in relying more and more on unreliable and dangerous sources.
