= Martín Zapater =

Spanish merchant and friend of Goya (1747-1803)

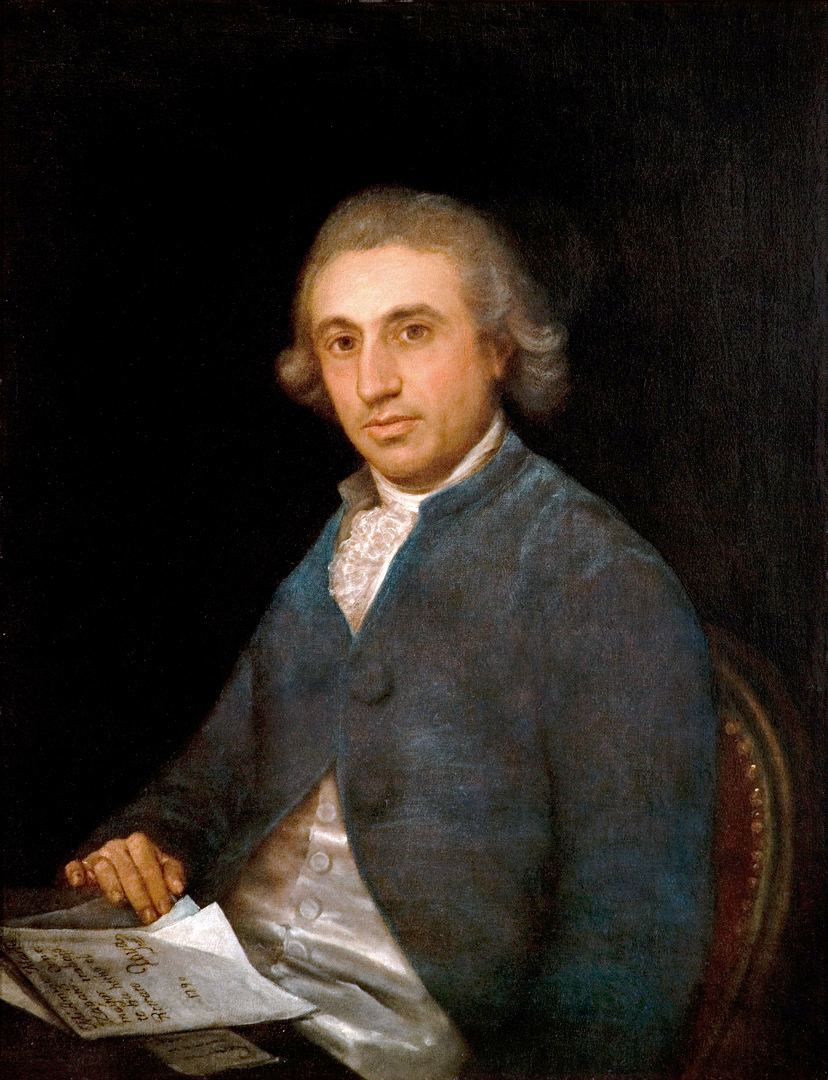
Martín Zapater; portrait by Francisco Goya (1790)

Martín Zapater y Clavería (12 November 1747, Zaragoza - 1803, Zaragoza) was a wealthy Aragonese merchant, with an enlightenment point of view. He is largely known for his close friendship with the artist Francisco Goya. The letters they exchanged constitute one of the primary sources of knowledge about Goya's life.

== Biography ==
He remained unmarried; spending much of his life in a house on the Calle del Coso, across from the Palacio de Sástago. As a member of the growing bourgeoisie of the eighteenth century, he amassed a significant fortune from his land sales and leasing to the City of Zaragoza, other institutions, and the local nobility. In 1778, he was appointed Diputado del Común for the city and, the following year, became a member of the Aragonese nobility himself, by order of King Charles IV.

He was an initiator for many of the Enlightenment-related institutions in Aragon; being a co-founder of the Sociedad Económica de Amigos del País in 1776 and serving as their Treasurer from 1790 to 1800. He also participated in the creation of the Real Academia de Bellas Artes de San Luis; of which he became an honorary Academician in 1793 and served as Counselor from 1797 to 1802. His actions were decisive in establishing the Jardín Botánico de Zaragoza and the Teatro Principal. He also gave grants and stipends to numerous promising students; enabling them to study architecture and engraving in Madrid.

His friendship with Goya apparently dates from their youth, when they studied together, although some historians have questioned this. In any event, they were known to have been close friends at the time of Goya's wedding, in 1773. His collection of letters passed to his grand-nephew, Francisco Zapater y Gómez, who published some of them and wrote a short biography of Goya.
