= Nigel Glendinning =

British historian (1929–2013)

- Nigel Glendinning at the Prado in 2005
- Born: 16 October 1929
- Died: 23 February 2013 (aged 83)
- Education: St John's School, Leatherhead; King's College, Cambridge
- Occupation: Academic

Oliver Nigel Valentine Glendinning (16 October 1929 – 23 February 2013), known as Nigel Glendinning, was a scholar and authority on Goya and 18th Century Spanish literature. He wrote a history of Spanish literature in the age of the Enlightenment and his analytical approach to Goya combined the artist's work with an understanding of its historical context.

Glendinning was an Honorary Fellow of the Hispanic Society of America. King Juan Carlos of Spain made him a Commander of the Order of Isabel La Católica in 1988, and the University of Salamanca awarded him the Elio Antonio de Nebrija prize in 2007. He received honorary doctorates from the Complutense University of Madrid and the University of Southampton.

Glendinning's obituary in The Guardian described him as the 'kindest and most generous of colleagues'.

== Life ==
Oliver Nigel Valentine Glendinning was born in East Sheen on 16 October 1929 into a musical and artistic family. His mother, Olive (née Ledward), was the sister of the sculptor Gilbert Ledward, and sister in law of the painter Percy Jowett. Nigel's father, Alec Glendinning, was a bank manager and keen amateur musician. Glendinning's mother had first been married to Guy Valentine, the son of the actor Sydney Valentine. Guy Valentine died in the First World War.

Glendinning started his early education as a chorister at St Paul's Cathedral School before joining St John's School, Leatherhead. After school he joined the Royal Army Educational Corps as part of his War Service and later read French and Spanish at King's College, Cambridge. He stayed at King's to obtain his doctorate specialising in the work of José Cadalso.

Glendinning went on to lecture at Christ Church, Oxford. His knowledge of Goya led him to contribute to a Royal Academy exhibition of the artist's work in 1963. After Oxford he held a Chair at the University of Southampton and subsequent professorships at Trinity College, Dublin, and Queen Mary's, London, the latter of which he was made Professor Emeritus in 1991.

Glendinning was an Honorary Fellow of the Hispanic Society of America. The University of Salamanca awarded him the Elio Antonio de Nebrija prize in 2007. King Juan Carlos of Spain made him a Commander of the Order of Isabel La Católica, and he was awarded honorary doctorates from the Complutense University of Madrid and the University of Southampton.

As a young lecturer Glendinning married his undergraduate student, the future writer Victoria Glendinning (née Seebohm), whom he divorced in 1981. He is survived by four sons: Simon Glendinning, Paul Glendinning, the photographer Hugo Glendinning and the sport journalist Matthew Glendinning.

== Selected bibliography ==
- Vida y obra de Cadalso (Joseph de Cadalso, 1741-1782, His Life And His Works, Versión castellana de Ángela Figuera), published 1962 OCLC 164088619
- The Eighteenth Century, Literary History of Spain, London, 1972 OCLC 1070574937
- The Interpretation Of Goya's Black Paintings, London, 1975 OCLC 1075644508
- Spanish Painting In The Golden Age, published by the Hispanic and Luso Brazilian Council, London, 1977 OCLC 976582350
- Nineteenth-Century British Envoys In Spain And The Taste For Spanish Art In England, Documents for Collecting published in the Burlington Magazine, London, 1989 OCLC 715698439
- Goya And His Critics, published by Ann Arbor, USA, 1995 OCLC 1132301597
