= Juan Bautista Arriaza =

Spanish poet and writer

The Most Excellent Juan Bautista Arriaza
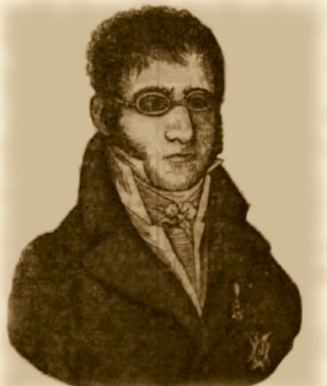
- Born: Juan Bautista Arriaza Superviela; 27 February 1770; Madrid, Spain
- Died: 22 January 1837 (aged 66); Madrid, Spain

Seat K of the Real Academia Española
- In office 1829 – 22 January 1837
- Preceded by: José de Vargas Ponce
- Succeeded by: Mariano Roca de Togores

Juan Bautista Arriaza Superviela (27 February 1770, Madrid – 22 January 1837) was a Spanish poet and writer.

Arriaza was elected to seat K of the Real Academia Española in 1829.

== Works ==
- Firsts, 1796
- Poetic Art, 1807 (L'Art poétique translation (1674) of Nicolas Boileau)
- Patriotic Poems, 1810
- Lyrical Poetry, 1829
- Thank Terpsichore or dancing, modern edition Graces dancing, Madrid, Hero, 1936.
