= Richard Peckover =

Richard Stuart Peckover (5 May 1942 – 15 August 2005) was a British nuclear physicist who was Chief Safety Adviser to the UK Atomic Energy Authority, 2000–2002.

Peckover married Carole Jordan in 1971; they divorced in 1983. In 1996, he married again to Elizabeth Griffiths (née Richardson).
