= Marques del Duero =

Marques del Duero may refer to:

- Spanish gunboat Marques del Duero
- Manuel Gutiérrez de la Concha, 19th-century Spanish military commander and politician
- Marqués del Duero (Madrid), equestrian statue in Madrid, Spain
