= Joaquín Agrasot =

Spanish painter

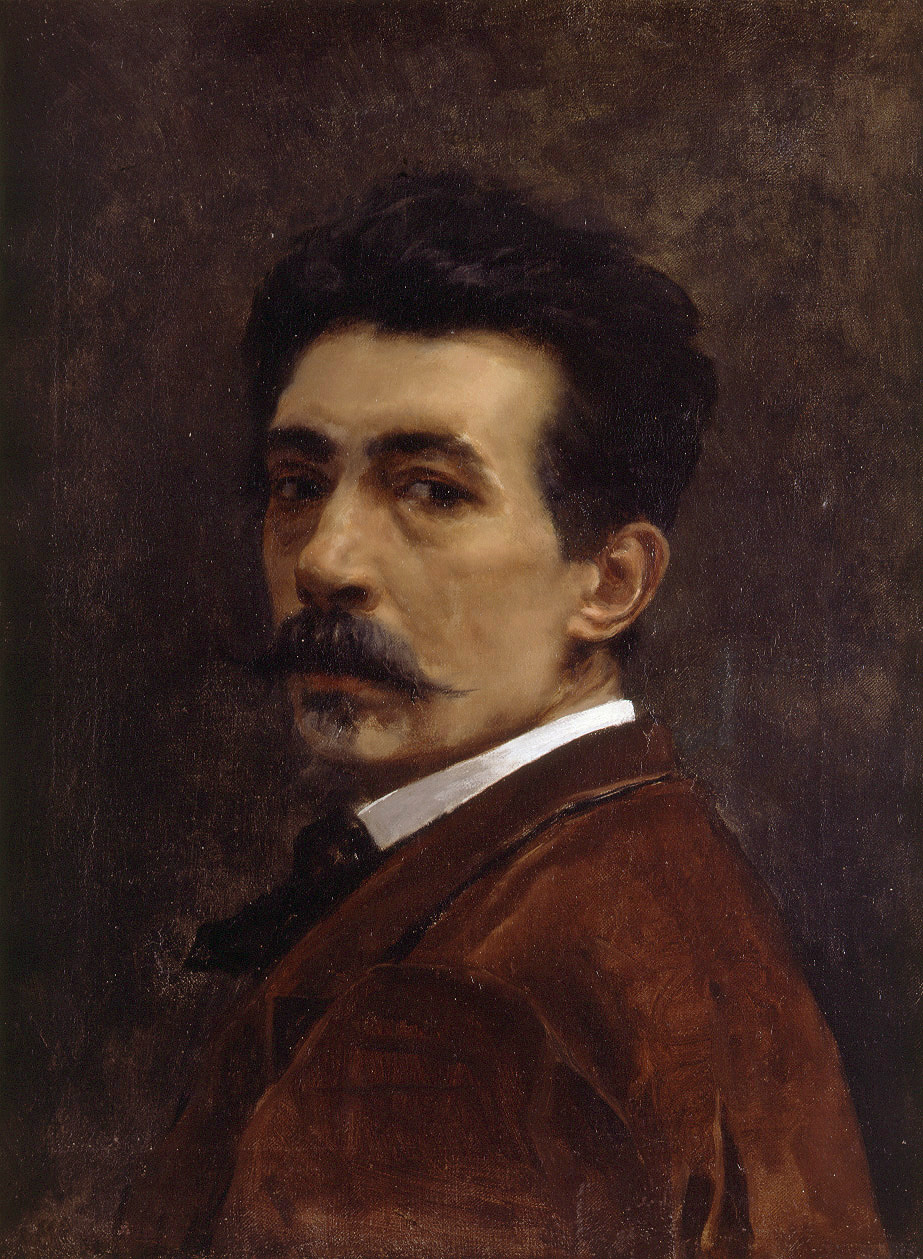
Self-portrait (1867)

Joaquín Agrasot y Juan (24 December 1836 – 8 January 1919) was a Spanish painter of the Realistic style who produced many works in the Costumbrismo genre.

== Biography ==
Agrasot was born in Orihuela. His studies began in his home town and, in 1856, he received a fellowship from the "Diputación Provincial de Alicante", the local government. He then enrolled at the Real Academia de Bellas Artes de San Carlos de Valencia, where he studied with the art restorer Francisco Martínez Yago, the father of Salvador Martínez Cubells. In 1860, he had his first showing at an agricultural fair in Alicante, where he was awarded a gold medal.

The following year, he received another fellowship to study in Rome. While there, he became a member of the artistic circle that congregated at the Antico Caffè Greco; a group that included Eduardo Rosales, José Casado del Alisal and Marià Fortuny. These contacts had a profound influence on his style. He submitted many canvases to the National Exhibition of Fine Arts and received substantial recognition.

After three years, he returned to Orihuela, then lived in Granada at an artists' commune, got married, and went back to Italy, remaining until early 1875, when he returned to Spain upon hearing that his friend, Fortuny, had died. This time, he settled permanently in Valencia. The following year, he received a medal at the Centennial Exposition in Philadelphia. Later, he became a member of both the Real Academia de Bellas Artes de San Fernando and his alma mater, San Carlos. He often served as a jury member for the Academies' exhibitions. He died in Valencia, aged 82.

Although he largely devoted himself to Costumbrismo paintings, which were often criticized as being too commercial, his paintings on historical subjects were very popular. In 1884, the Spanish government bought his painting "The Death of the Marqués del Duero" for display in the Senate.

== Selected paintings ==
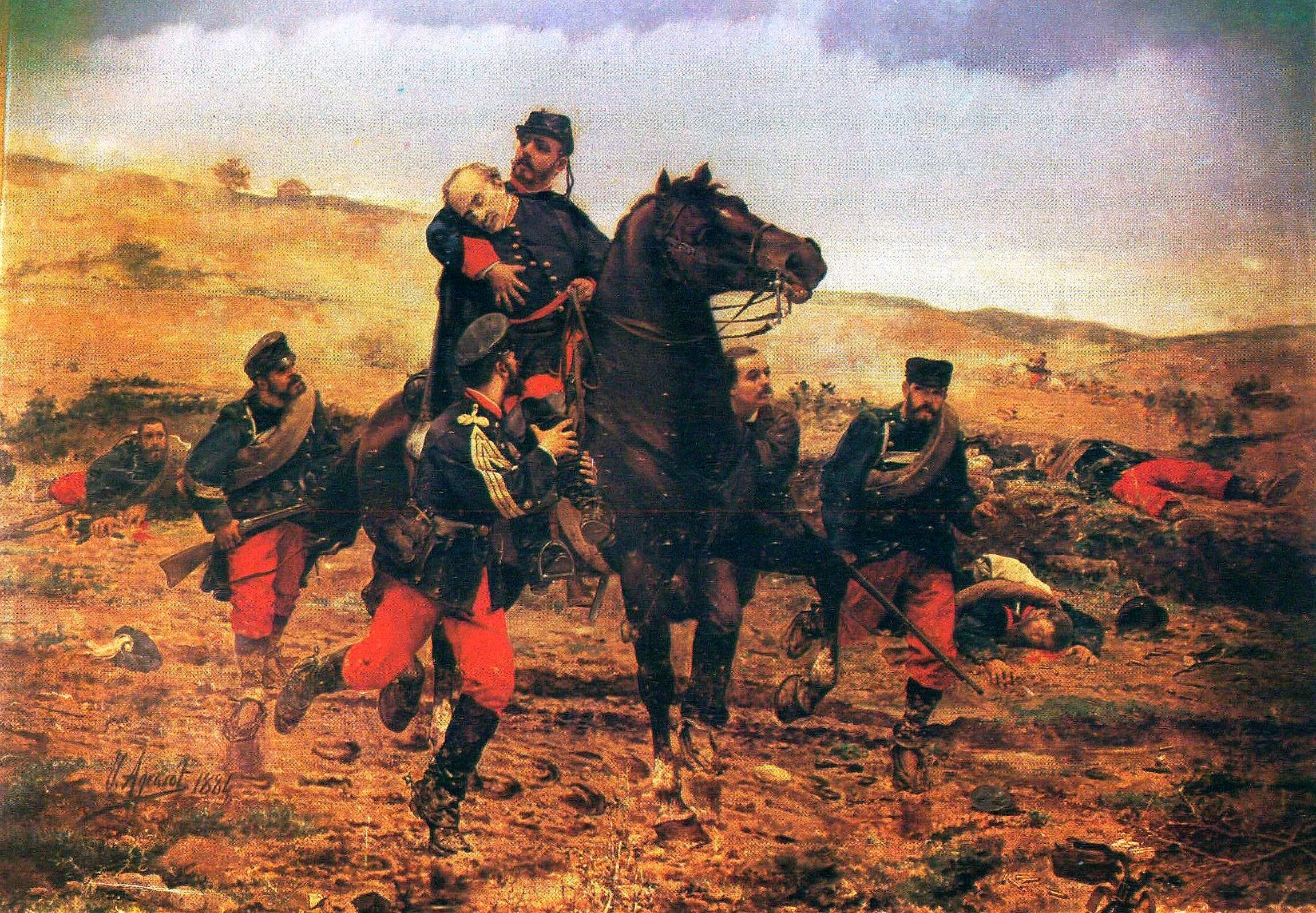
The Death of the Marqués del Duero (1884)

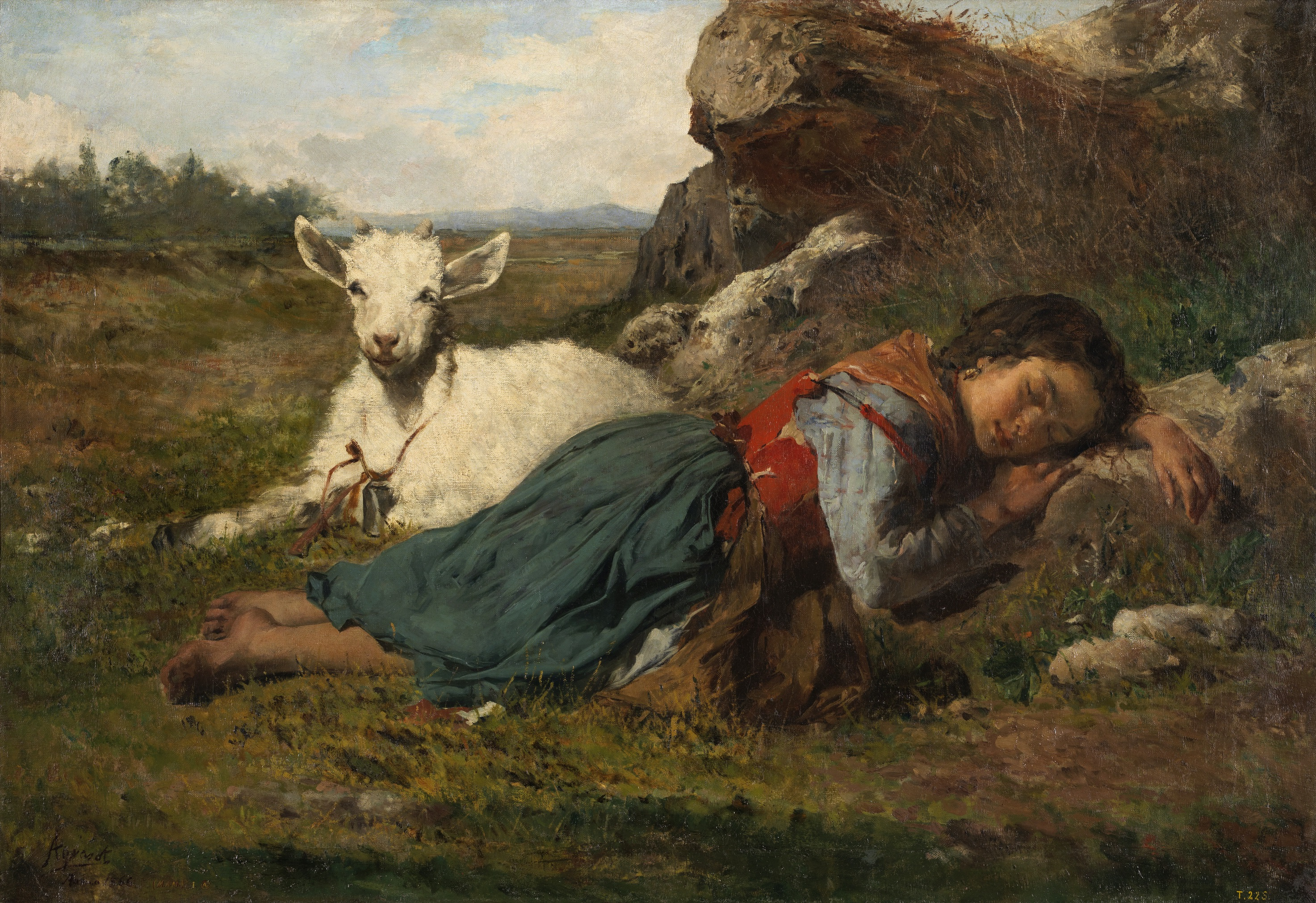
Two Friends (1866)

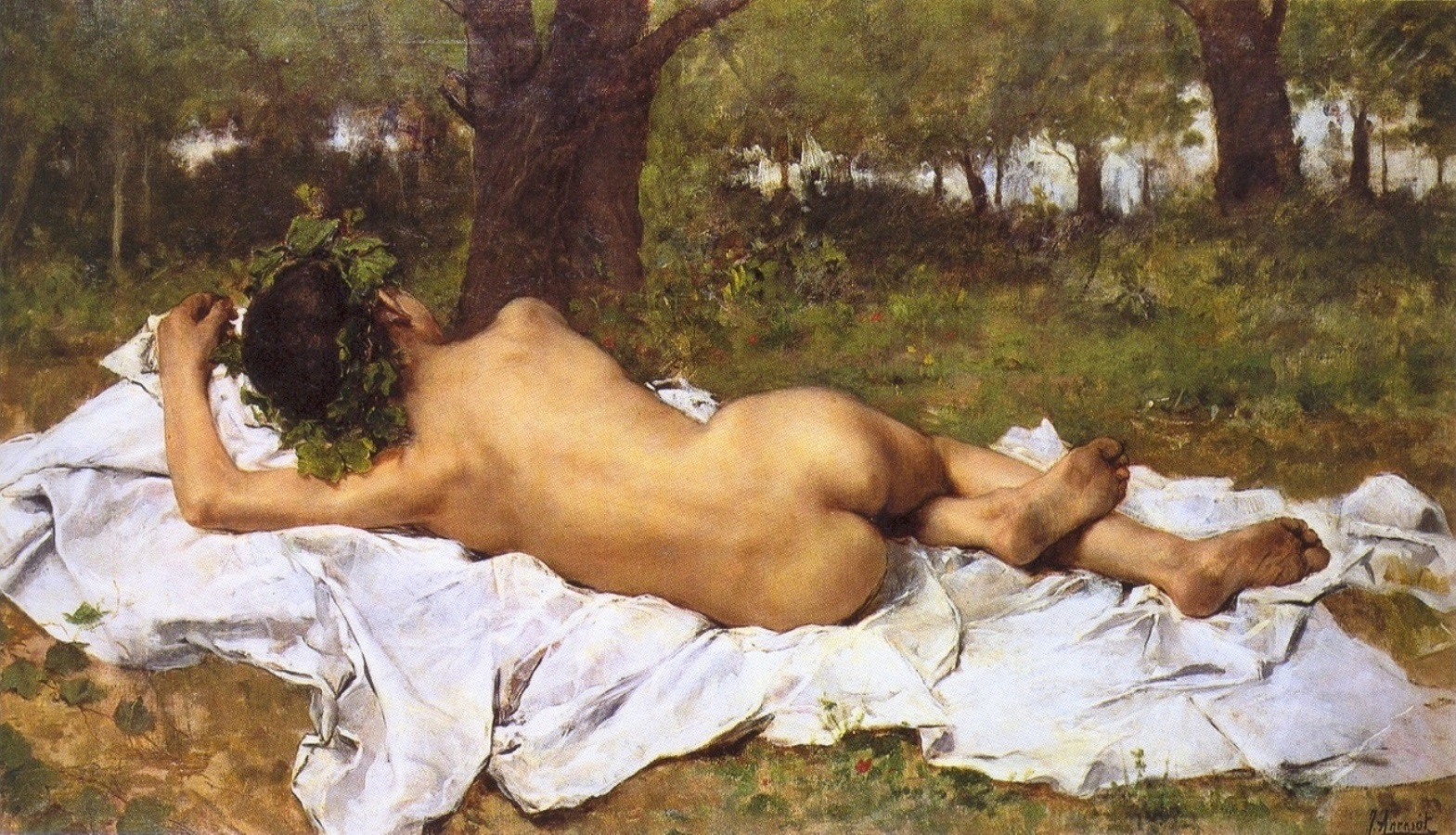
Young Bacchus (1872)

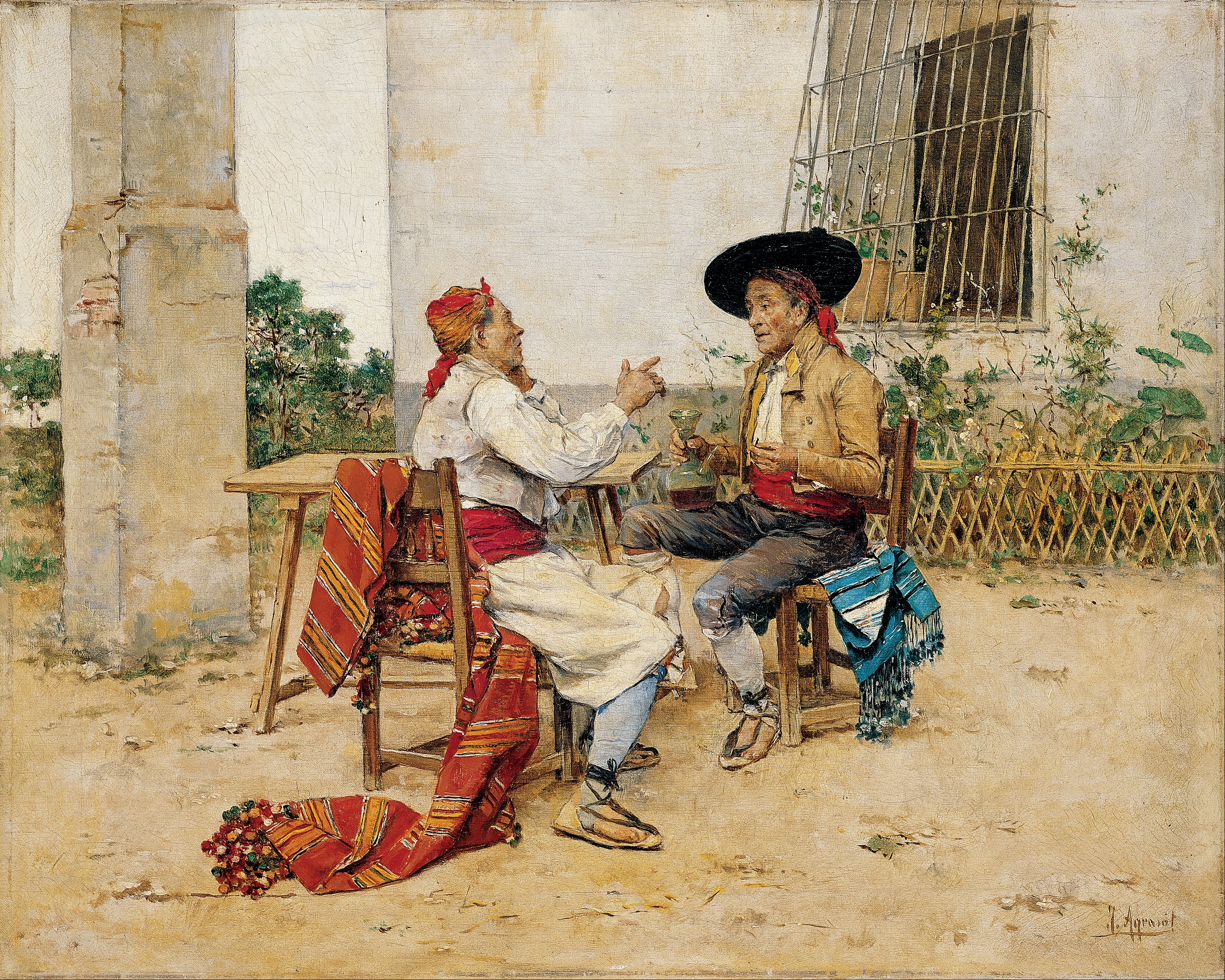
Two Inhabitants of the Valencia Huerta (late 1880s)

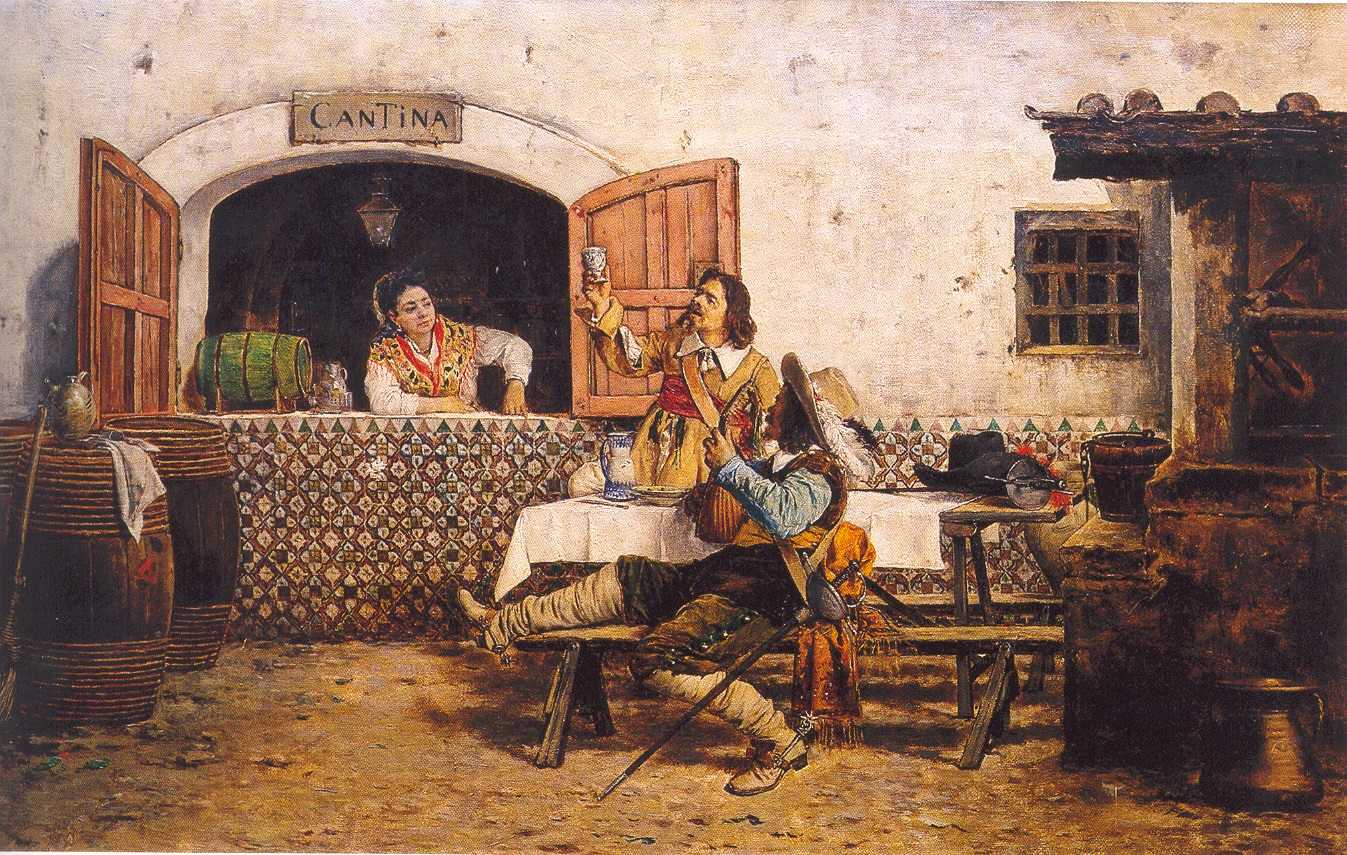
Musketeers Sitting Outside a Cantina (1885 - 1890)
