= Enrique Martínez Cubells =

Spanish painter (1874–1947)

Return from the Catch

Work, Rest and Family

Enrique Martínez Cubells y Ruiz Diosayuda (28 April 1874 in Madrid – 25 February 1947 in Málaga) was a Spanish painter. He specialized in genre scenes of village life, with a focus on the fishing community.

== Biography ==
His father was the painter and art restorer, Salvador Martínez Cubells, who provided him with his first lessons. His grandfather, Francisco Martínez Yago, was also a painter. Later, he attended the Escuela Especial de Pintura, Escultura y Grabado and the Real Academia de Bellas Artes de San Fernando. His teachers included Emilio Sala, Antonio Muñoz Degrain and Carlos de Haes.

In 1899, he moved to Germany, where he settled in Munich; using it as a base for travels throughout Europe. While there, he continued his studies with Heinrich von Zügel and was strongly influenced by the works of Wilhelm Leibl. He also first displayed preferences for marine art, genre scenes and portraits; predilections which came into full focus after 1903, when he visited the Netherlands and was exposed to the Hague School. Upon returning to Spain, he was named a Professor at the Escuela de Artes y Oficios and his alma mater, the Real Academia, where he was later named an Academician.

He participated in numerous exhibitions; including the National Exhibition of Fine Arts, where he received a Third Class prize in 1897, Second Class prizes in 1899 and 1901, and First Class prizes in 1904 and 1912, for "Work, Rest and family", and "Return from the Catch", respectively. He was also awarded a gold medal at the Exposición Internacional de Buenos Aires in 1910 and the Exposición Nacional de Panamá in 1916. These awards encouraged him to visit America. He would participate in over forty international exhibitions altogether.

Following his father's death in 1914, he built upon his existing collection to create one of the most significant private art collections in Spain. He was the recipient of numerous honors, including the Civil Order of Alfonso XII, the Order of Isabella the Catholic and the Order of Merit of the Bavarian Crown. Some of his most familiar works may be seen at the Carmen Thyssen Museum. In 2003, a major retrospective was held by the Centro de Exposiciones y Congresos de Ibercaja, in Zaragoza.
