= Cantina =

Bar

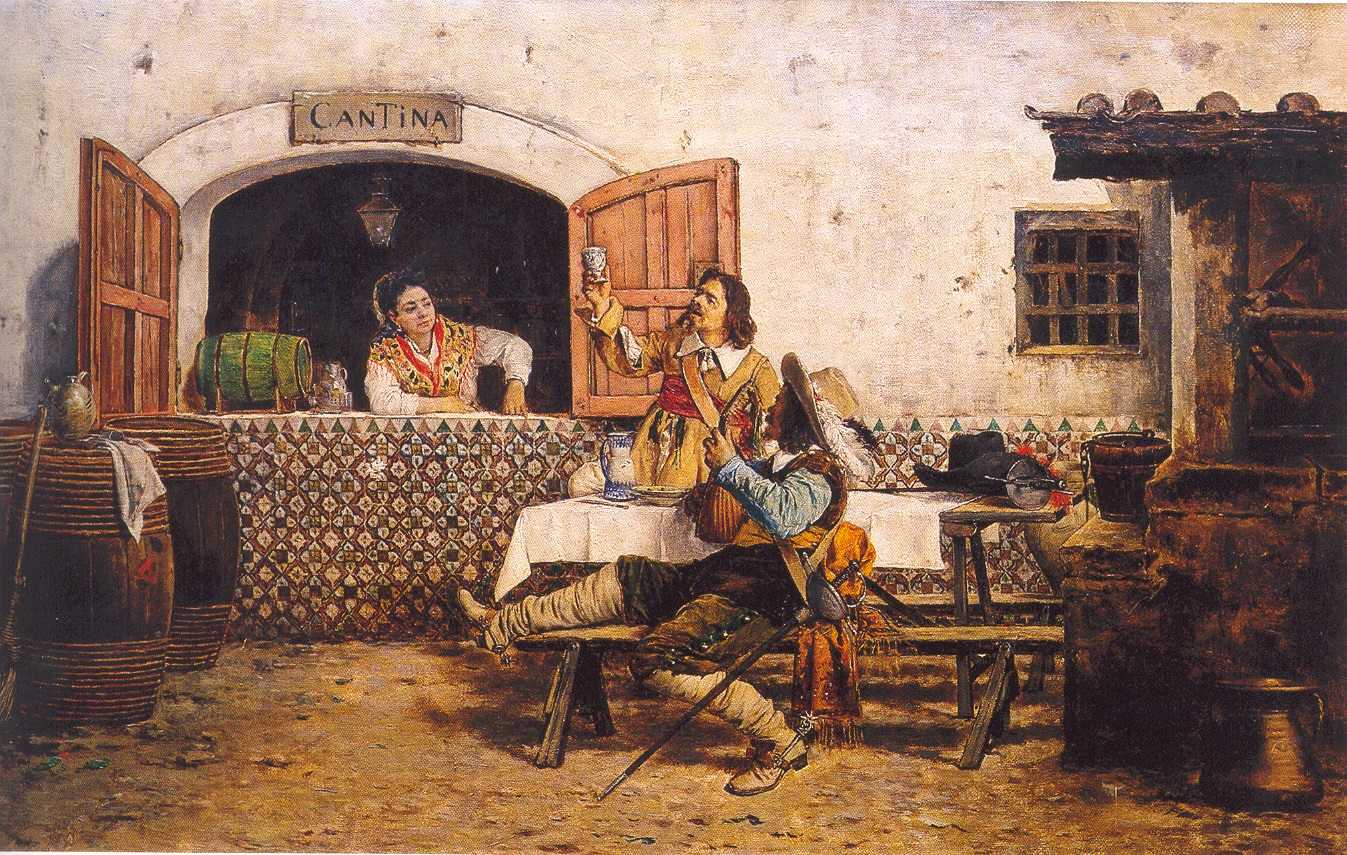
Musketeers sitting outside a cantina, painted by Joaquín Agrasot, 1885–1890

A cantina is a type of bar common in Latin America and Spain. The word is similar in etymology to "canteen", and is derived from the Italian word for a cellar, winery, or vault. In Italy, the word cantina refers to a room below the ground level where wine and other products such as salami are stored.

As cantine it was used to refer to the shop of a sutler, an army camp follower.

== Types of cantinas ==
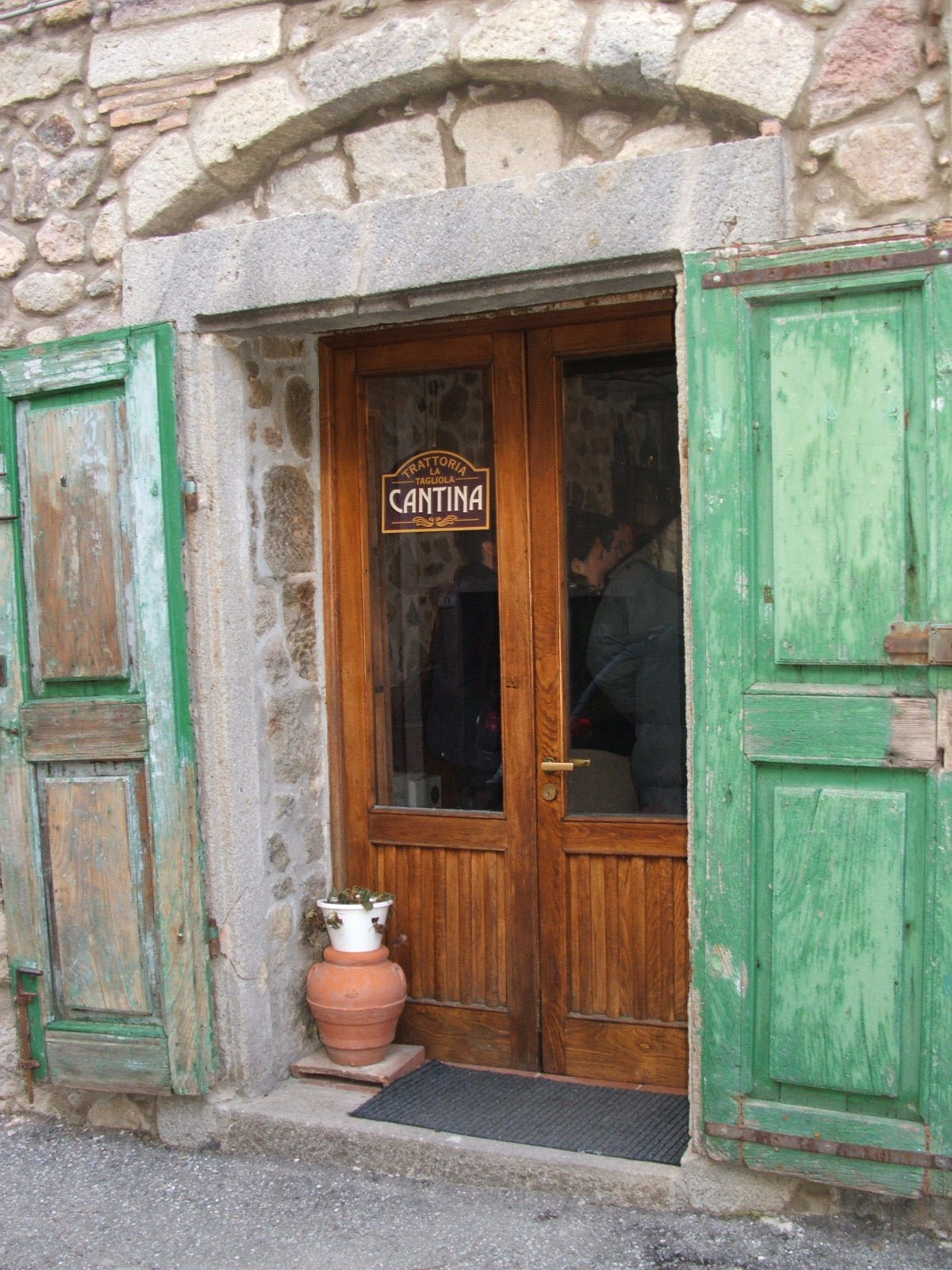
An osteria at Castel del Piano, Tuscany

=== Spain ===
In Spain, a cantina is a bar located in a train station or any establishment located at or near a workplace where food and drinks are served.

Cantina was one of the foreign words that entered in from Renaissance Italy. During the 16th century, the Spanish Empire included large holdings in Italy. Luis de Bávia wrote in his Tercera y Cuarta Parte de la Historia Pontifical y Católica (1621): "Perdiéndose en las cantinas y lugares baxos [sic] gran número de mercaderías..." ("Losing itself in the cantinas and places of ill repute a large quantity of merchandise...").

The cantina features in one of the sonnets of Francisco de Quevedo (1580-1645). This is a quatrain from that sonnet:

Esta cantina revestida en faz;
esta vendimia en hábito soez;
este pellejo, que, con media nuez,'
queda con una cuba taz a taz.

This wine-cellar covered with a face;
This wine-harvest [clad] in filthy habit;
This wine-skin, which, with just a sip,
Is happy to exchange it for a [whole] vat.

=== Mexico ===
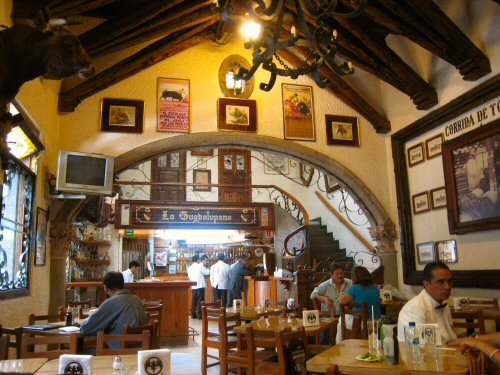
Interior of cantina in Coyoacan, Mexico City

In rural Mexico, a cantina traditionally is a kind of bar frequented by males for drinking alcohol and eating botanas (appetizers). Some cantinas are also known for being places where people gather to play dominoes, cards or other table games. Cantinas can often be distinguished by signs that expressly prohibit entrance to women and minors, as opposed to a club, salon de bailar (dance hall), or salon de mariachi (typified by the Salon Tenampa, at the Plaza Garibaldi in Mexico City) which are intended for socializing between the sexes. Also, some cantinas explicitly prohibit entrance to dogs and men in police or military uniform. Some of the traditional restrictions on entry to cantinas are beginning to fade away. However, in many areas it is still viewed as scandalous for proper ladies to be seen visiting a genuine cantina.

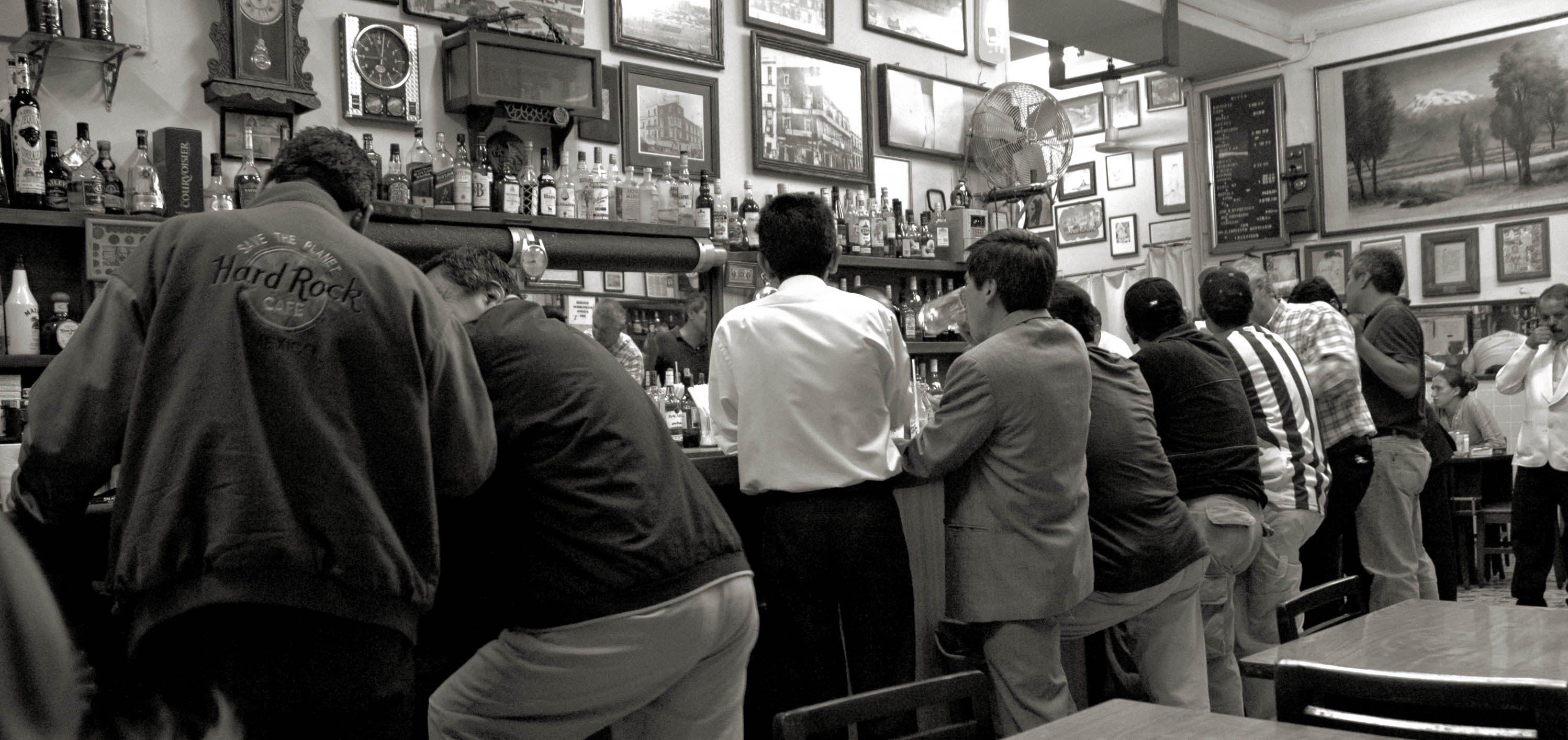
Locals at the El Nivel cantina in Mexico City

=== Angola ===
Specifically In the musseques (Rural Areas) a cantina traditionally is a corner shop or bar frequented by the locals where they drink alcohol and eat petiscos (appetizers). Some cantinas in Angola are places where people gather to dance or play games.

=== United States ===
A cantina in the U.S. is simply a tavern with a Southwestern or Mexican motif that serves traditional alcoholic Mexican drinks. In the 1890s, cantina entered American English from the Spanish language in the Southwest United States with the meaning of "bar room, saloon".

=== Other ===
The term cantina entered the French language circa 1710.

== See also ==
- Bar
- Juke joint
- List of public house topics
- Mos Eisley
- Prison commissary
- Public house
- Tavern
