= Francisco Sans Cabot =

Spanish painter (1828–1881)

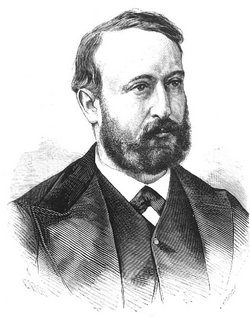
1881 portrait of Cabot

Francisco Sans Cabot (9 April 1828 – 5 May 1881) was a Spanish painter who served as director of the Museo del Prado from 1873 to 1881.

== Biography ==
His father was a navigator in the Royal Spanish Navy. He attending the Escola de la Llotja from 1850 to 1855, where he originally studied silversmithing (following the wishes of his family) but decided to pursue painting instead. The following year, he went to Paris to continue his studies with Thomas Couture and Horace Vernet. In 1858, he won a medal at an exhibition in Rome for his portrayal of Francisco de Quevedo seeing Martin Luther in Hell. After that, he decided to specialize in painting historical scenes. In 1865, he returned to Spain and was commissioned by the Diputació de Barcelona (a local government agency) to portray General Juan Prim in battle during the Hispano-Moroccan War.

After the overthrow of Queen Regent Isabel II, he returned to Girona. However, shortly after the founding of the First Spanish Republic, he was appointed Director of the Museo del Prado, succeeding Antonio Gisbert, who had resigned because of his opposition to the new government. While there, he dedicated himself to overseeing the restoration of its oldest paintings. During his tenure, the museum received as a donation the "Black Paintings" of Francisco de Goya, which had been removed from the walls at Goya's home and transferred to canvas by Salvador Martínez Cubells, a well-known art restorer. After 1875, Sans was an Academician at the Real Academia de Bellas Artes de San Fernando.

Towards the end of his life, he changed his style again, this time trending towards Realism. In 1881, he received what would be his last major commission from the University of Barcelona to portray King Alfonso XII dressed in the uniform of the Order of the Golden Fleece. He also decorated several theaters, including the Teatro Real, Teatro Apolo and the Teatro de la Zarzuela, and created murals at the Alcázar de Toledo.

== Gallery ==
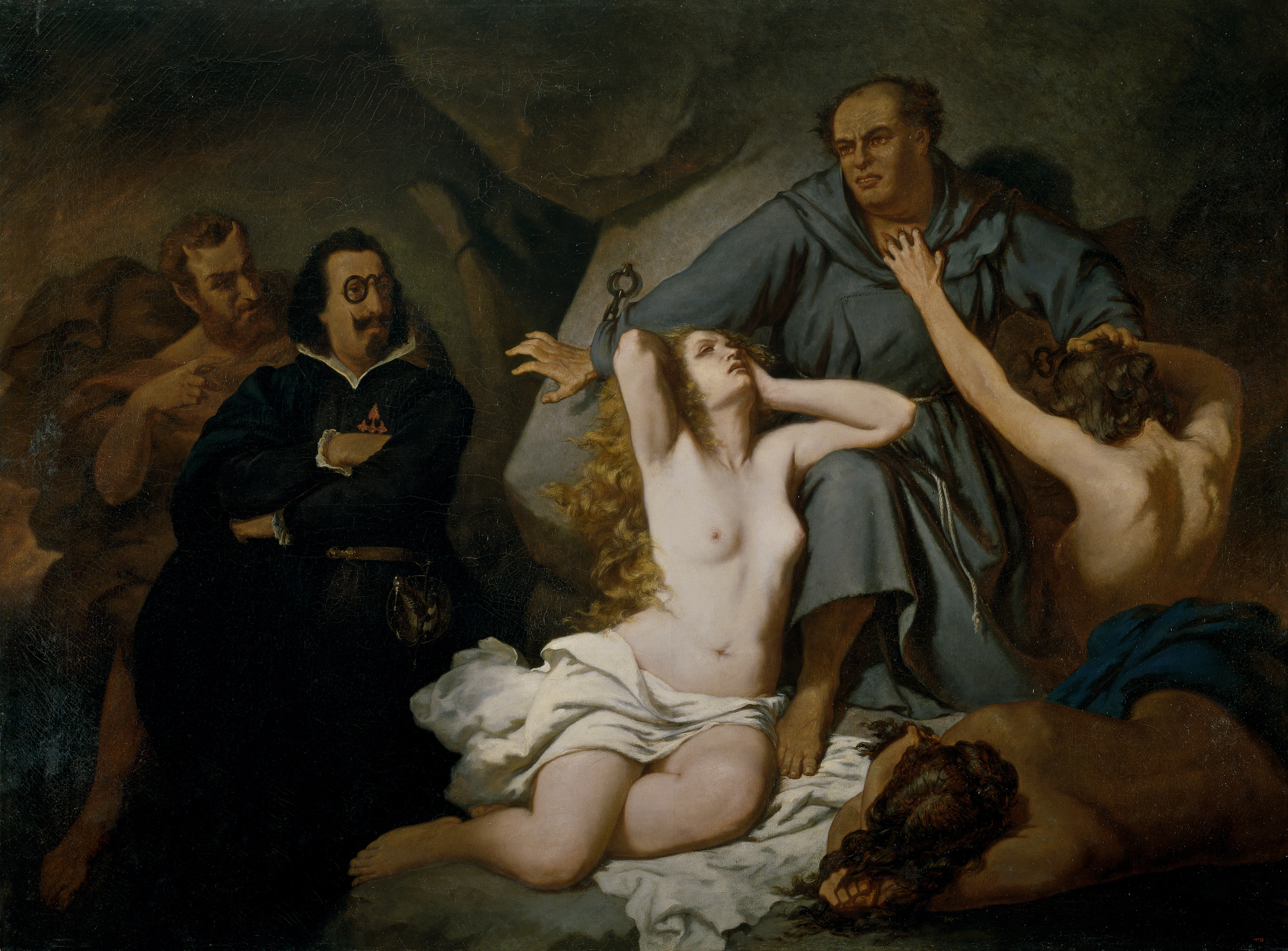
Martin Luther in Hell (1858)

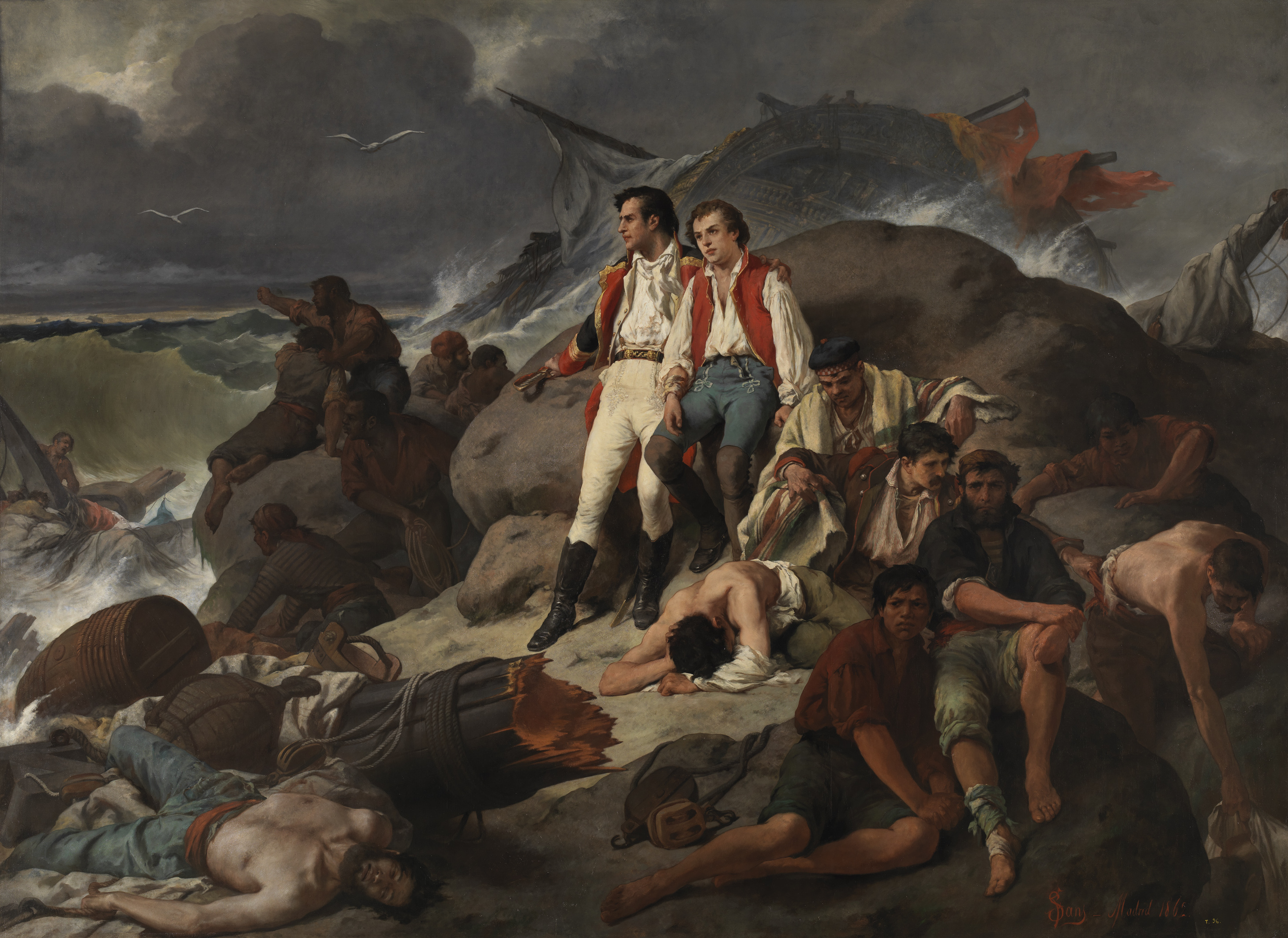
Episode after Trafalgar (1862)
