= Salvador Martínez Cubells =

Spanish painter

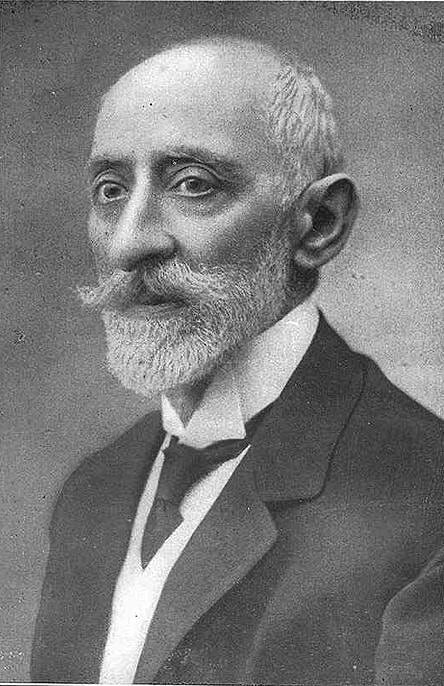
- Born: 9 November 1845; Valencia, Spain
- Died: 21 January 1914 (aged 68); Madrid, Spain
- Education: Francisco Martínez Yago (father)
- Known for: Painter, art restorer
- Movement: Orientalist

Salvador Martínez Cubells (9 November 1845 – 21 January 1914) was a Spanish painter and art restorer (Paintings conservator), who specialized in history painting and Costumbrismo.

== Biography ==
He was born in Valencia, and received his first art lessons from his father, Francisco Martínez Yago, who was also a painter. Among his first works was "Baile de labradores" (Peasants' Dance), which was shown at the National Exhibition of Fine Arts in 1864. Three years later, he exhibited a historical painting that was purchased by the es:Count of Pinohermoso. A year later, the Count bought another of his paintings at the es:Exposición Aragonesa. He would continue to participate in the National Exhibitions until 1889, displaying a total of seventy canvases.

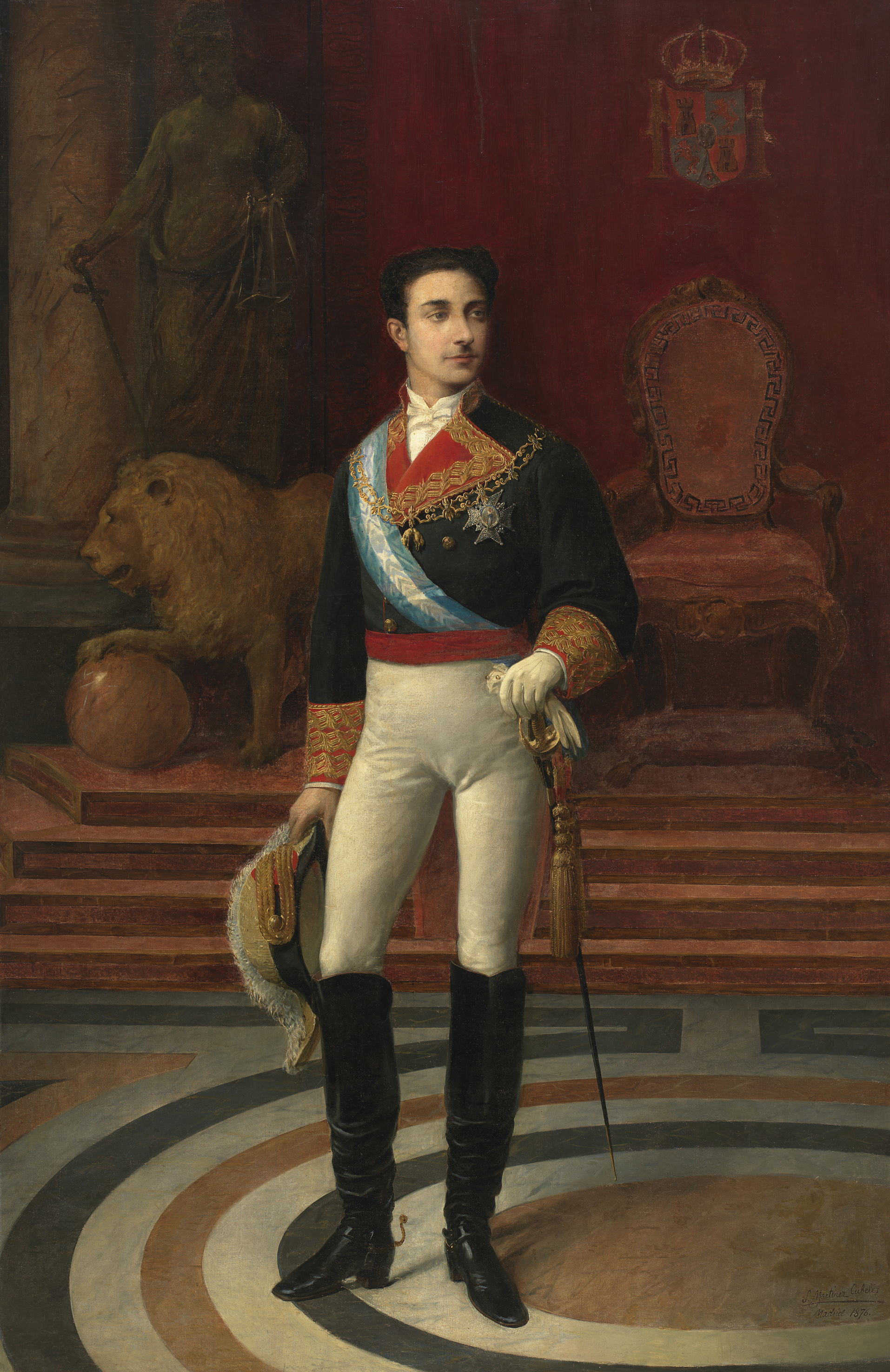
Portrait of King Alfonso XII (1876)

He concentrated on portraits, achieving a reputation among the aristocracy of Madrid, but also dedicated himself to art restoration. He became one of the foremost authorities on the subject at that time and, in 1869, was appointed the primary restorer at the Museo del Prado, initially under the direction of Antonio Gisbert, and continued in that position for twenty-six years, later serving under the direction of Francisco Sans Cabot and Federico de Madrazo. He also created a school for art restorers that he oversaw until his death. Among his most notable restorations were several works by El Greco and San Antonio de Padua by Bartolomé Esteban Murillo.

== The "Black Paintings" ==
Unquestionably though, his most challenging project involved the Black Paintings of Francisco de Goya, which were painted in oil on the walls of Goya's home, the "Quinta del Sordo". The images were transferred from the wall to canvases, using pictures taken by the French photographer Jean Laurent as a guide. Many of the paintings were smudgy, badly cracked, and smeared with plaster, so he took the initiative of restoring them to their original state, as much as possible. The home's owner at that time, Baron Émile d’Erlanger, had planned to sell them at the upcoming Exposition Universelle (1878). By the end of 1875, only four of the fourteen paintings had been transferred. This very slow progress apparently prompted d'Erlanger to change his mind and donate them to the Spanish government instead.

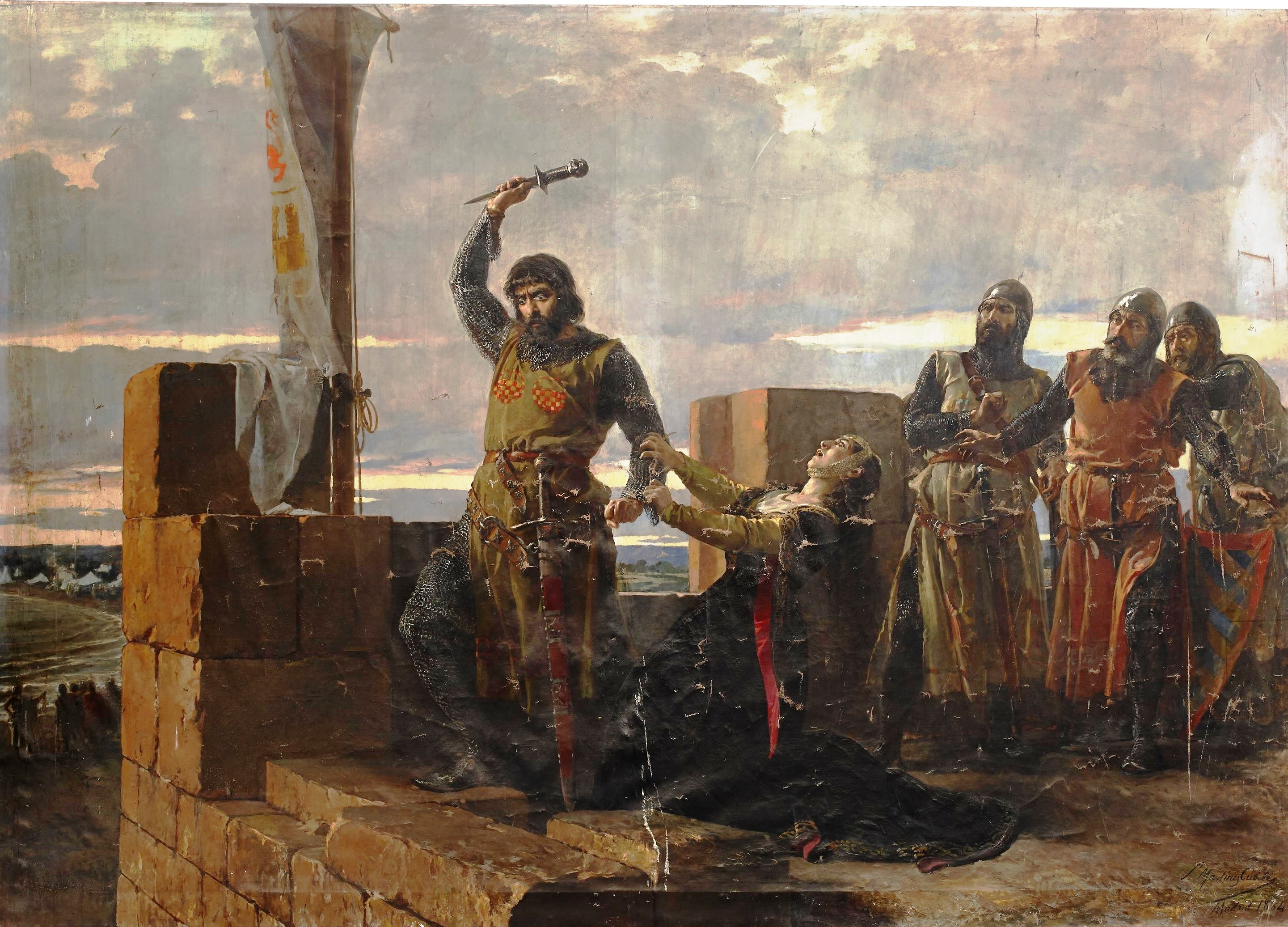
Guzmán el Bueno Throwing the Dagger (1883)

In addition to his painting and restoration, Martínez Cubells assisted Carlos Luis de Ribera in providing ornamentation for the San Francisco el Grande Basilica.

He was awarded the Grand Cross of the Order of Isabella the Catholic and the Order of Carlos III, was a member of the Real Academia de Bellas Artes de San Fernando and served as a professor at the "Escuela de Artes y Oficios" in Madrid. He died in Madrid, aged 63. His son, Enrique, also became a painter.
