= Monument to the Marquis of the Duero (Madrid) =

Equestrian statue honoring Spanish general in Madrid's Plaza del Doctor Marañón

Marqués del Duero
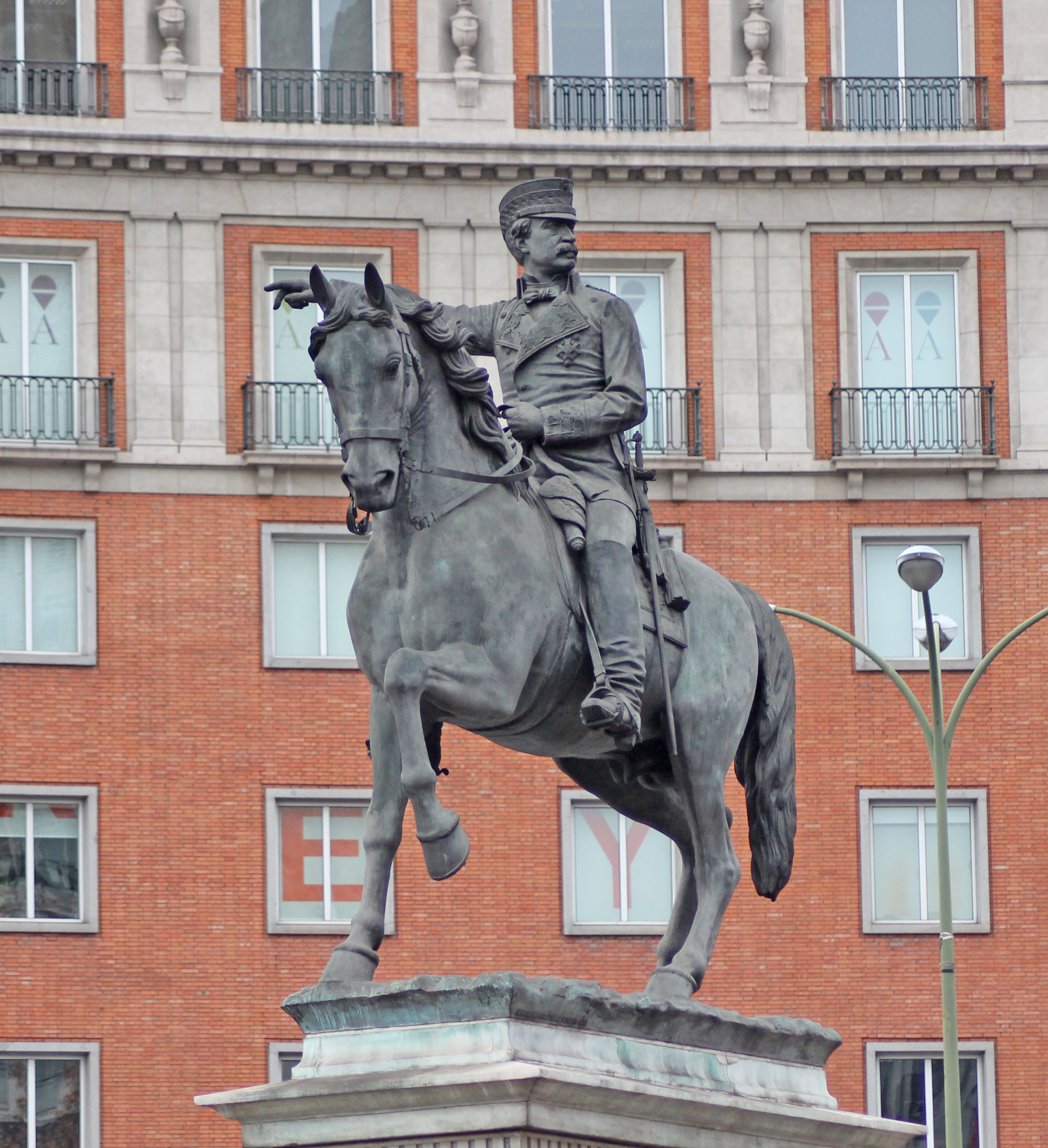
- 40.438005°N 3.690698°W
- Location: Plaza del Doctor Marañón, Madrid, Spain
- Designer: Andrés Aleu (statue); Pablo Gibert (reliefs)
- Material: Bronze, stone
- Height: 4.55 m (statue)
- Weight: 8,280 kg (statue)
- Opening date: 27 June 1885
- Dedicated to: Manuel Gutiérrez de la Concha e Irigoyen

Marqués del Duero, also known as Monumento al Marqués del Duero ("Monument to the Marquis of the Duero"), is an instance of public art located in Madrid, Spain. Erected on the centre of the Plaza del Doctor Marañón, the monument consists of a bronze equestrian statue representing Manuel Gutiérrez de la Concha e Irigoyen—a general who stood out in the fight against Carlism—on a stone pedestal decorated with two reliefs.

== History and description ==
A work by Andrés Aleu, the bronze statue is 4.55 meters high, and it weighs 8,280 kilograms. Reportedly the first equestrian statue cast in Spain since the 17th century, the bronze was cast in Seville, from cannons loaned by the Spanish State. Additional costs were funded via a nation-wide popular subscription. On the longitudinal sides of the stone pedestal there are two reliefs illustrating important episodes of the general's life, authored by Pablo Gibert.

One of the reliefs depicts the Spanish intervention in the neighbouring kingdom of Portugal in 1847 during the Portuguese Civil War, with Gutiérrez de la Concha entering the city of Porto followed by his staff, in the act of being received by the local leader of the insurrectionists, Vasconcelos, surrounded by his own people. This peacemaking role granted him a Grand Collar of the Order of the Tower and the Sword on the part of the Portuguese Government, and the nobiliary title of Marquis of Duero (Grandee of Spain) on that of Spain.

The other relief is inspired by the death of the general on 27 June 1874, depicting the moment when his assistants raised his mortally wounded body to a horse that would take the body out of the Battle of Monte Muro, an episode of the Third Carlist War. In bronze letters, the following inscription reads: Al capitán general, Marqués del Duero ("to the Captain General, Marquis del Duero").

The statue was placed on a marble base with three steps as a base upon its inauguration, surrounded by several rows of flower pots. It was unveiled on 27 June 1885.

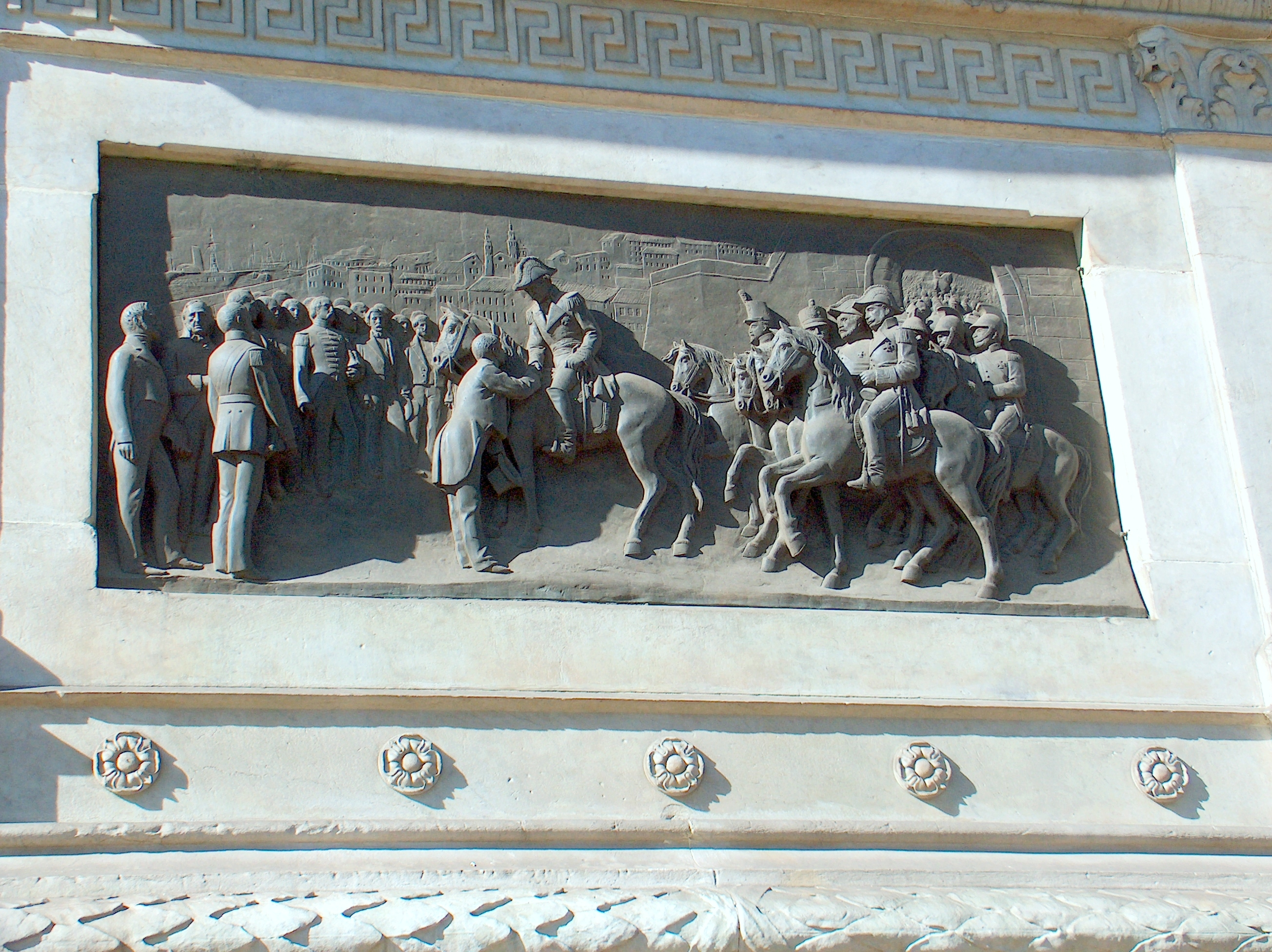
Relief depicting the entry of the general in Porto

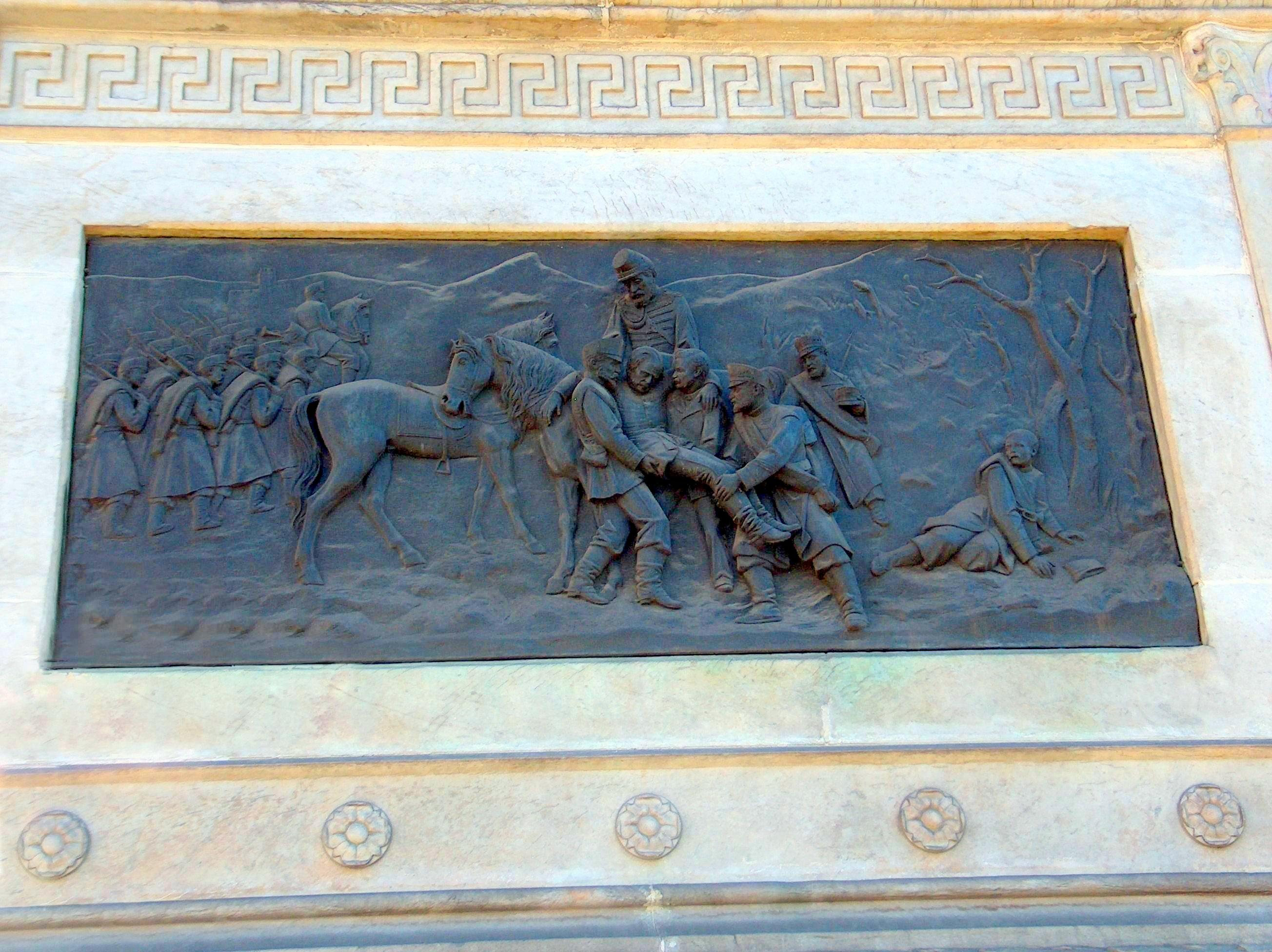
Relief depicting the death of the Marquis of Duero
