= Manuel Gutiérrez de la Concha, Marquis of the Duero =

Spanish military man and Liberal-Moderate politician

Manuel Gutiérrez de la Concha
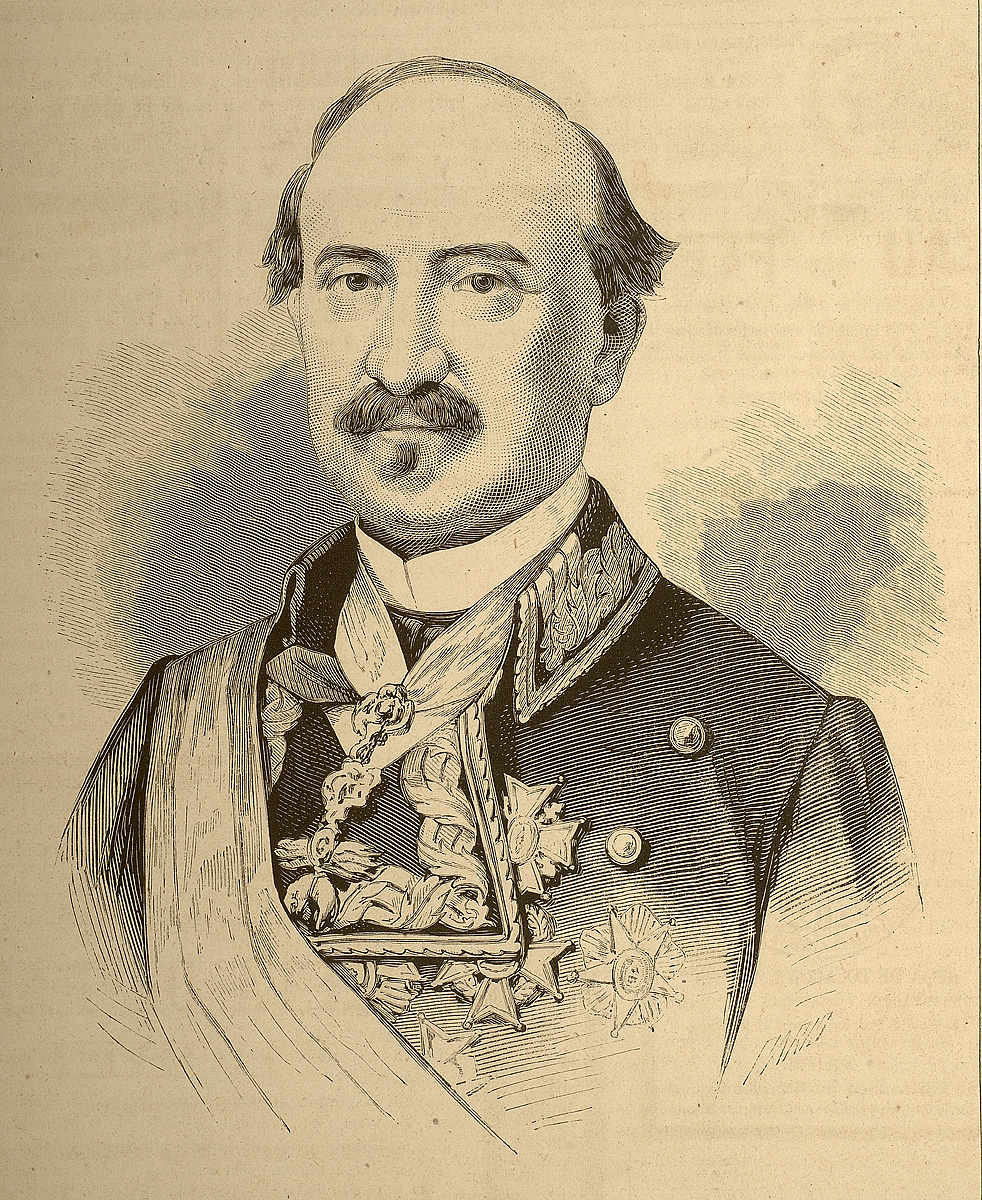
- 19th century litography
- Born: 3 April 1808; Córdoba del Tucumán, Viceroyalty of the Río de la Plata
- Died: 27 June 1874 (aged 66) Monte Muro, Navarre, Spain
- Buried: Pantheon of Illustrious Men, Madrid
- Allegiance: Spanish government in opposing the Carlists
- Rank: General, Captain-general, corps commander
- Commands: Third Corps of the Army of the North (1874)
- Battles: Durango, Urrieta, Belascoáin, Arróniz, Bilbao, Monte Muro
- Awards: Cross of San Fernando (three times)
- Spouse: Francisca de Paula Tovar y Gasca

Manuel Gutiérrez de la Concha e Irigoyen, Marquis of the Duero (3 April 1808 – 27 June 1874) was a Spanish military man and Liberal-Moderate politician, noted for opposing the Carlist rebellions. He was born in Córdoba del Tucumán, Viceroyalty of the Río de la Plata (now Córdoba, Argentina), on 3 April 1808, and died at Monte Muro, Navarre, on 27 June 1874.

== Biography ==
Manuel de la Concha was born in Córdoba in present-day Argentina. His mother was Petra Irigoyen and his father was Juan Gutiérrez de la Concha y Mazón, brigadier de marina (naval officer), and later gobernador intendente (governor) of the province of Tucumán. His father was killed during the fighting that followed the May Revolution in 1810. In 1814 the family moved to Spain, where Manuel de la Concha began his schooling. He entered the Royal Guard as a cadet in 1820, was promoted to alférez (second lieutenant) in 1825 and to lieutenant in 1832.

He became a supporter of the Liberals, for which he spent some months in prison before the death of Fernando VII. He was released during the First Carlist War, and joined the supporters of Isabella II. He was posted to the Army of the North and distinguished himself in the actions at Durango, Alsasua and Zúñiga, being awarded the Cross of San Fernando. In April 1836 he was given his first military command in recognition of his bravery in battle. He received further promotions and reached the rank of lieutenant-colonel after the conquest of Urrieta. The battle of Belascoáin earned him a second Cross of San Fernando and promotion to colonel. He became mariscal de campo (a rank between brigadier and lieutenant-general) in 1840. He then took part in the campaign of Arróniz, and won a third Cross of San Fernando. He supported the Moderate (moderado) party. In 1841 he was appointed comandante general (commanding general) of the provinces of Guadalajara and Cuenca.

In October 1841, along with Diego de León and other military men and moderado politicians, he took part in the failed attempt to end the regency of Espartero, and due to this he was compelled to go into exile in Florence. In the summer of 1843 he took an active part in the fall of Espartero, brought about by Narváez, and this earned him promotion to lieutenant-general. The moderados who gained power appointed him inspector-general of the infantry, and later captain-general of Old Castile.

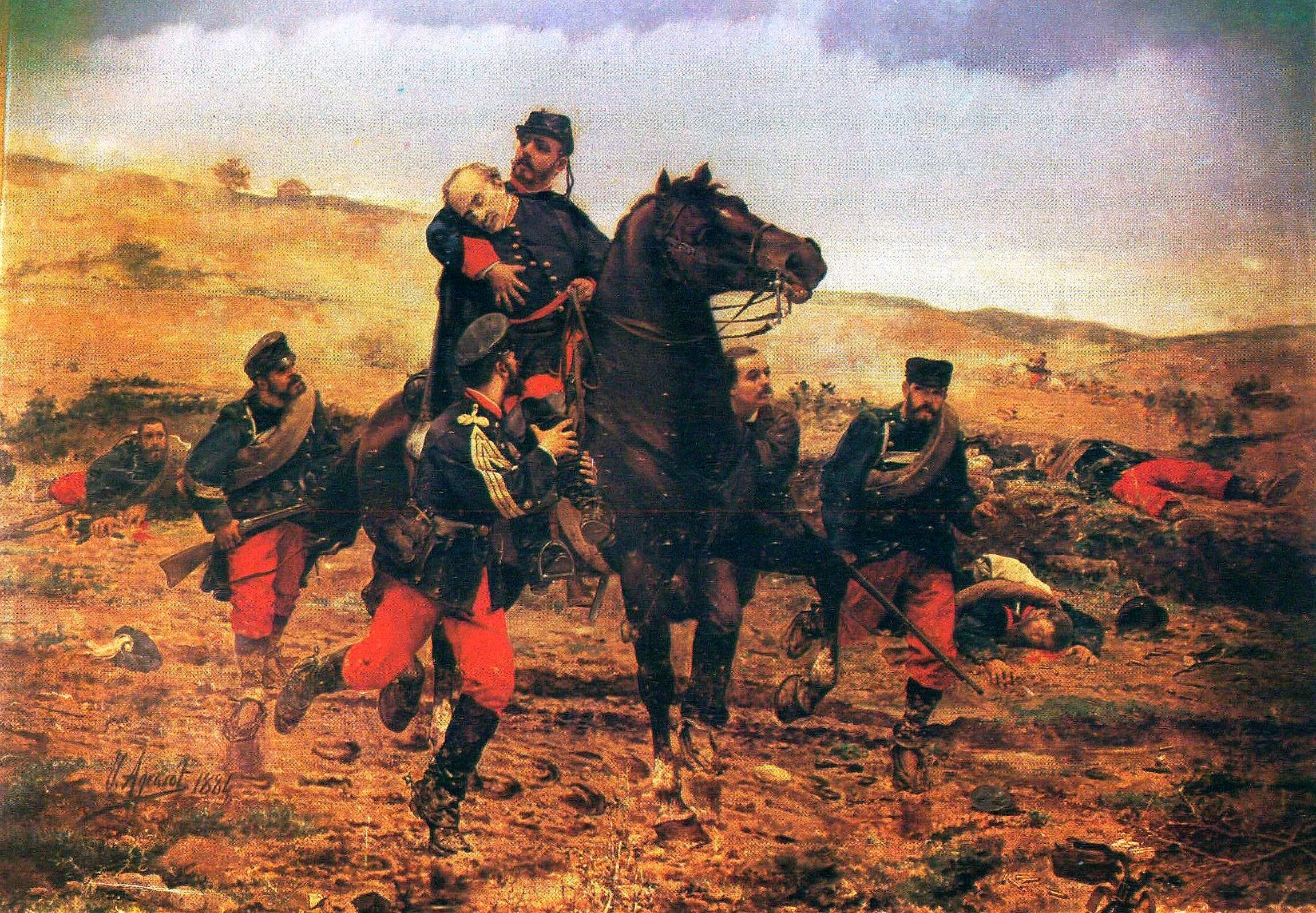
Death of the Marquess of Duero, by Joaquín Agrasot, painted 1884

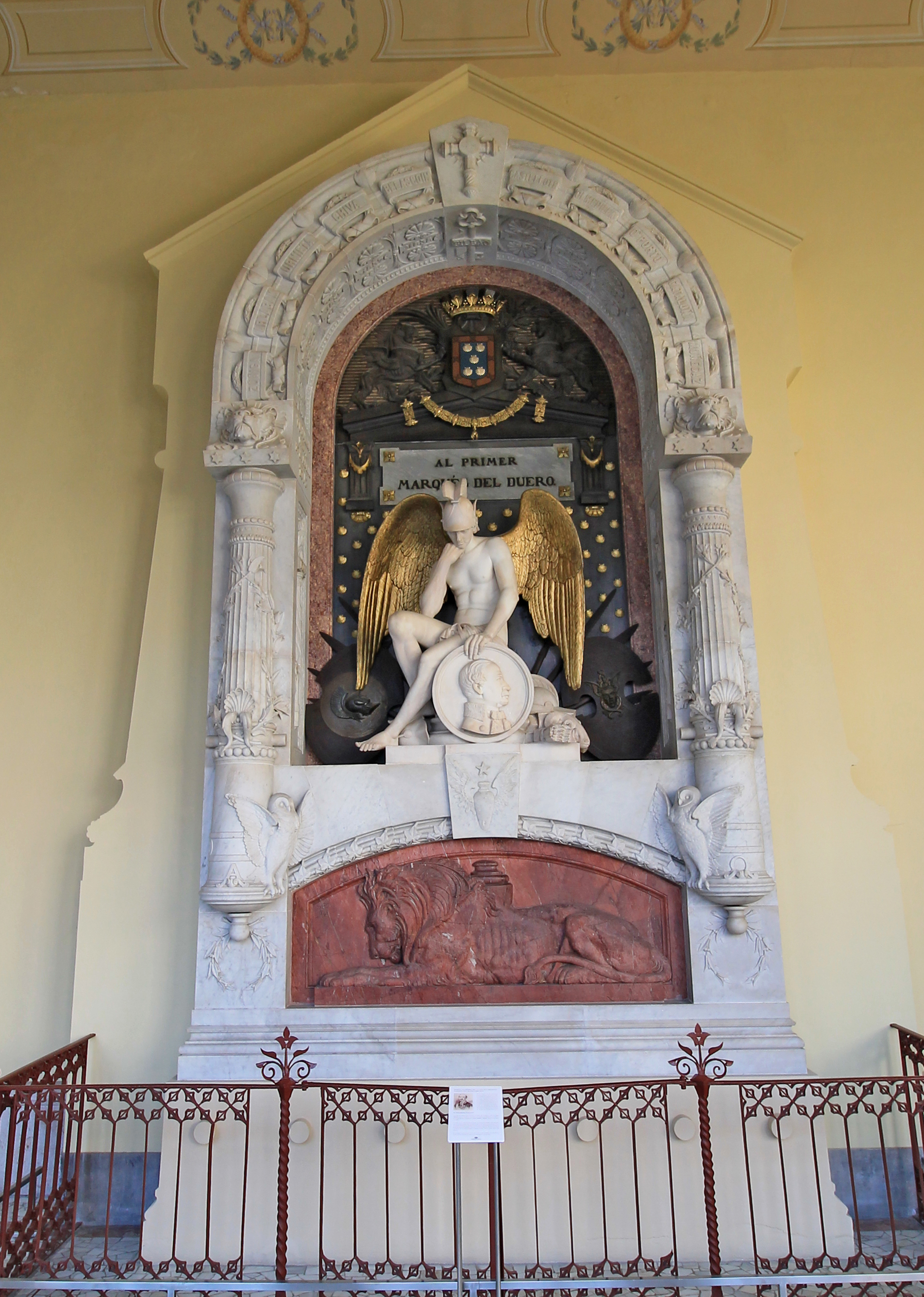
Mausoleum of the Marquess of Duero at the Pantheon of Illustrious Men, Madrid

In 1847 he was ordered to lead an expedition to Portugal to help uphold the reign of Queen Maria II of Portugal, under the terms of the Quadruple Alliance. On 30 June 1847 he defeated the Septembrist forces led by Francisco Xavier da Silva Pereira, first Count of Antas, and restored by force the authority of the monarchy in Porto. For this he received honours in both Spain and Portugal, in particular becoming Marqués (marquis) del Duero and receiving the title of Grandee of the first class.

As captain-general of Catalonia, in 1849 he put down the revolt of the matiners (Catalan) or madrugadores (Spanish) during the Second Carlist War.

He worked with General Leopoldo O'Donnell during the bienio progresista (1854–1856), when in addition to his post of captain-general of Catalonia, he served as deputy to the Cortes and chairman of the Junta Consultiva de Guerra (advisory war council). He was captain-general of the Two Castiles during the Unión Liberal government, and in the 1860s he was Speaker of the Senate through five consecutive terms.

In 1872 the Third Carlist War broke out: and despite his age, on the request of General Serrano, Gutiérrez de la Concha returned to both military and political activity, and became one of the strongest supporters of Alfonso XII of Spain. On the grounds of his great ability and military prestige he was considered the leading 19th-century Spanish strategist. This led the republican government in 1874 to give him command of the Third Corps of the Army of the North, a unit that was essential to the defence of the régime. For three months he was responsible for the northern front opposing the Carlists, and won important victories including the relief of Bilbao, in May.

During preparations for the attack on Estella, the symbolic Carlist capital, he was fatally wounded when struck by a bullet at Monte Muro, near the village of Abárzuza, on the afternoon of 27 June 1874.

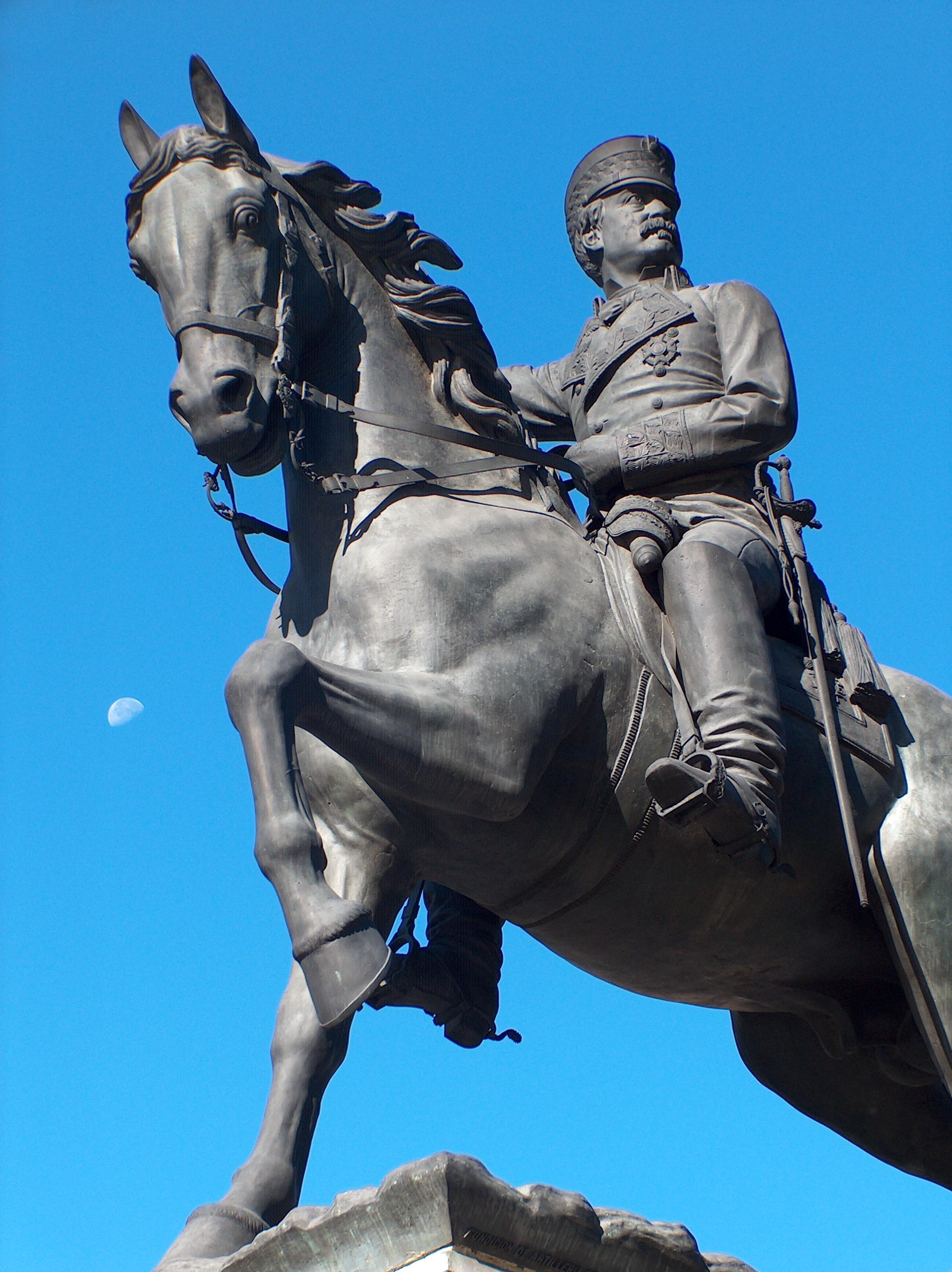
Equestrian statue in Madrid

With victory over the Carlists now imminent, Manuel Gutiérrez de la Concha would probably have been chosen to proclaim the restoration of the Bourbons to the Spanish throne, with the support of Antonio Cánovas del Castillo. In the event it was one of his subordinates, General Martínez Campos, who was to proclaim this a few months later at Sagunto.

Manuel Gutiérrez de la Concha wrote Táctica de las tres armas (Tactics of the Three Forces) (1862), a work highly valued in its time, and recently re-published by the Spanish Ministry of Defence.

== San Pedro Alcántara ==
Gutiérrez de la Concha was married to Francisca de Paula Tovar y Gasca, marchioness of Revilla, of Aguilares and of Castro de Torres, countess of Cancelada and of Lences, who had a substantial holding of farms and country estates. On one of these, on the outskirts of Málaga, the marquis improved the yield of the cane sugar crop, and this may have encouraged him to start new agricultural enterprises based on cane sugar.

For this purpose he began to acquire land holdings on the western coast of the Province of Málaga at the end of the 1850s. Making use of legal provisions enacted in 1855, 1866 and 1868 to promote rural development, he set up an agricultural settlement at San Pedro Alcántara; this was the origin of the present-day village. The settlement was a large estate of approximately 5,000 ha, including land around Marbella, Benahavís and Estepona, where he introduced the latest agricultural techniques and machinery, in addition to a training farm and an up-to-date sugar processing plant.
