= Francisco Martínez Yago =

Spanish painter

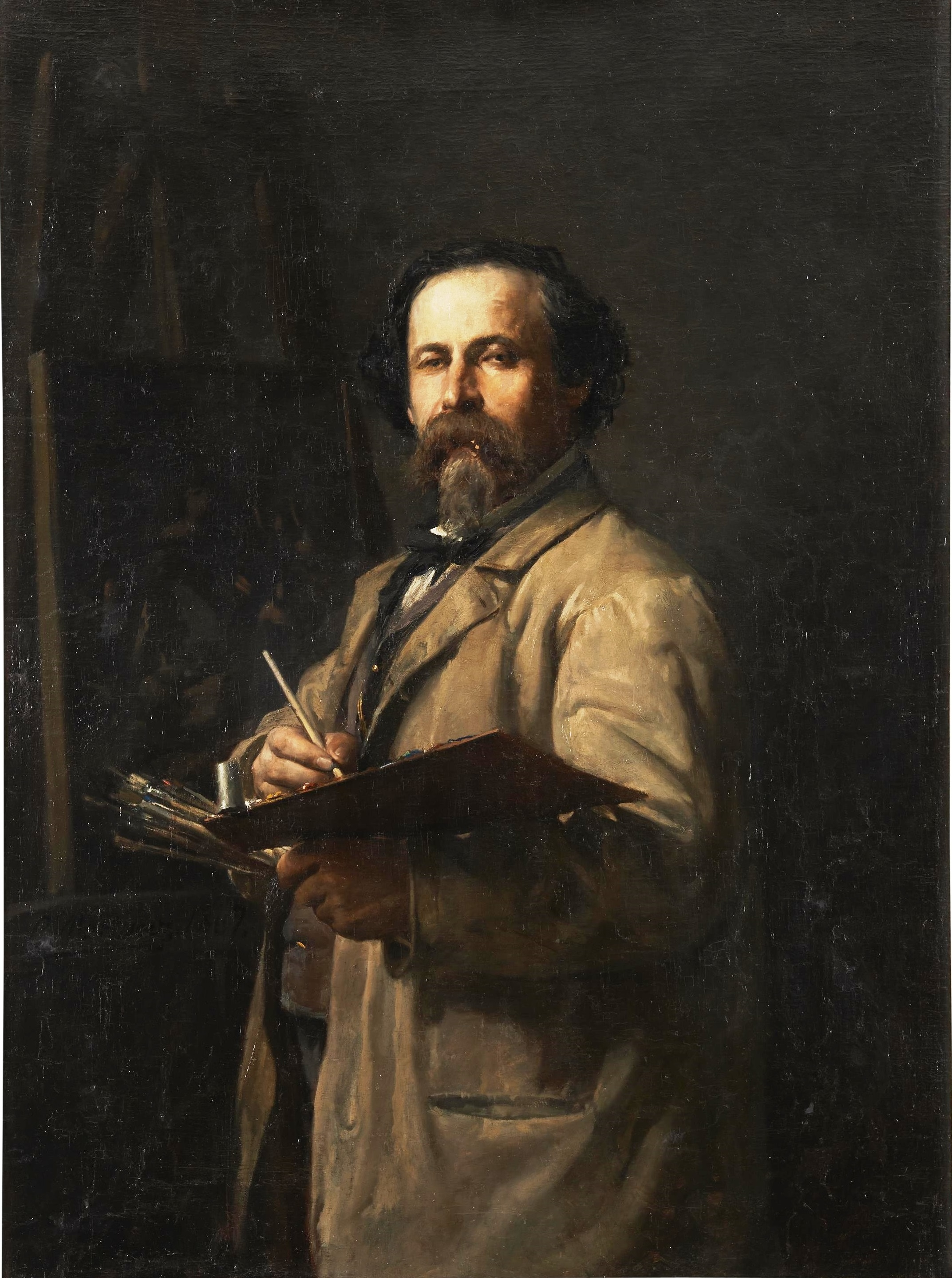
Francisco Martínez Yago; portrait by his son (c.1867)

Francisco Martínez Yago (2 November 1814, Paiporta - 19 January 1895, Valencia) was a Spanish painter; father of Salvador Martínez Cubells.

== Biography ==
He began his artistic studies under the direction of Francisco Grau. Later, he completed them with Francisco Llácer Valdermont (1781-1857) and Miguel Parra Abril, while enrolled at the Academia de San Carlos. During his time there, he won several awards. In 1844, the Academia named him a supernumerary Academician for painting. Three years later, he was awarded the same title for history. The following year, upon the death of Pedro Pérez, he was appointed to be the Academia's Keeper ("Conserje").

Most of his paintings were commissioned by individuals and organizations; notably a portrait of Bruno of Cologne for the Jesuit Church, an Assumption for the parish church in Torrente, and several works on Greek mythology for Count Parsent.

After 1880, he decided to devote himself exclusively to restoration. Over the course of his career, he restored 54 paintings at Valencia Cathedral, fourteen in the parish of San Andrés, and many works by Juan de Juanes. He also did work in France and England.
