= La Tauromaquia =

Series of prints by Francisco Goya depicting bullfighting scenes

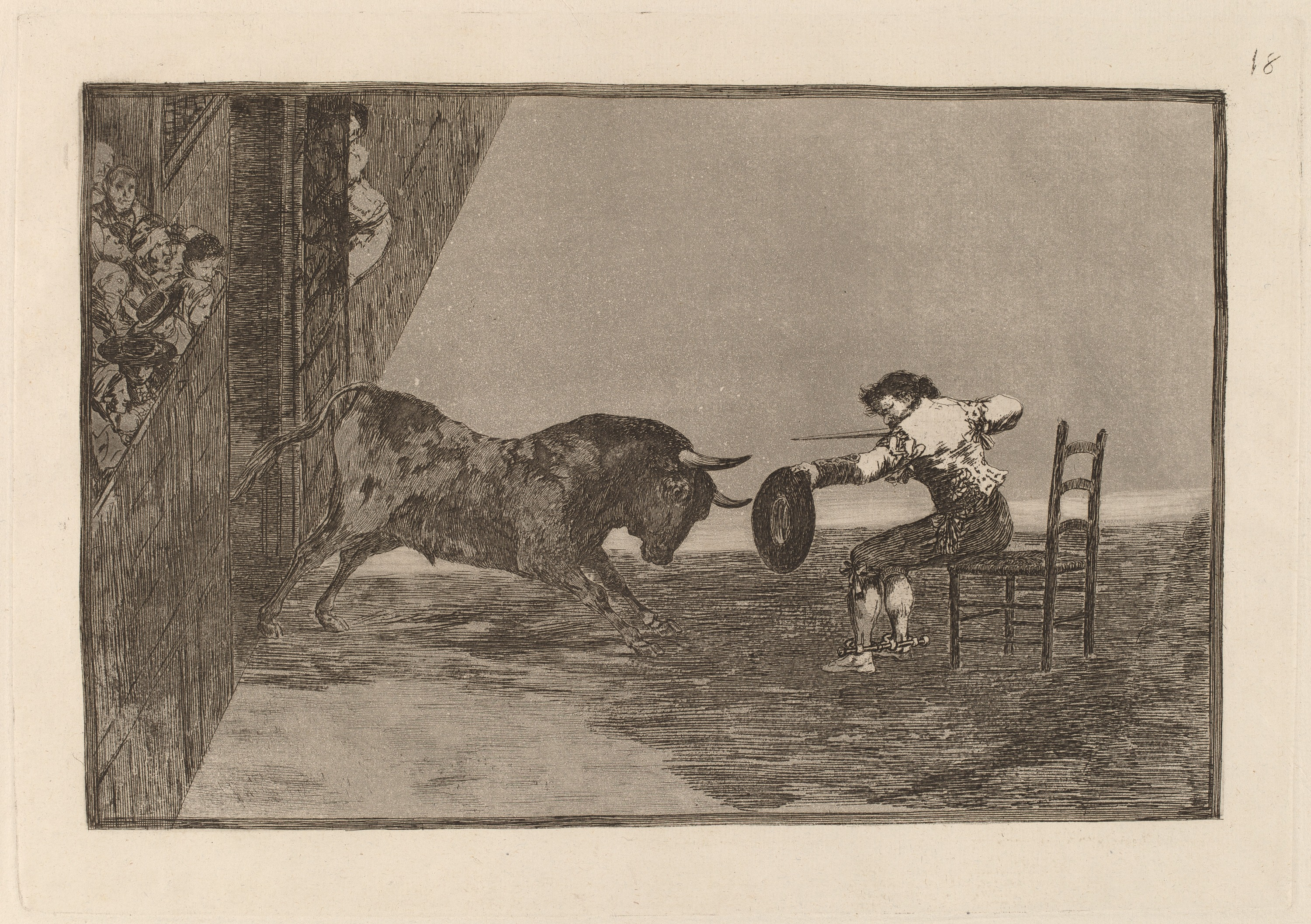
Νο.18: The Daring of Martincho in the Ring at Zaragoza, etching and aquatint 24,5 × 35,5 cm. In this work from La Tauromaquia a famous bullfighter is depicted sitting on a chair and with feet shackled together while facing the attacking bull. Here, Goya ignores – partly – the laws of perspective, depicting the viewers in a rather unusual way in order to give more dynamism to the work.

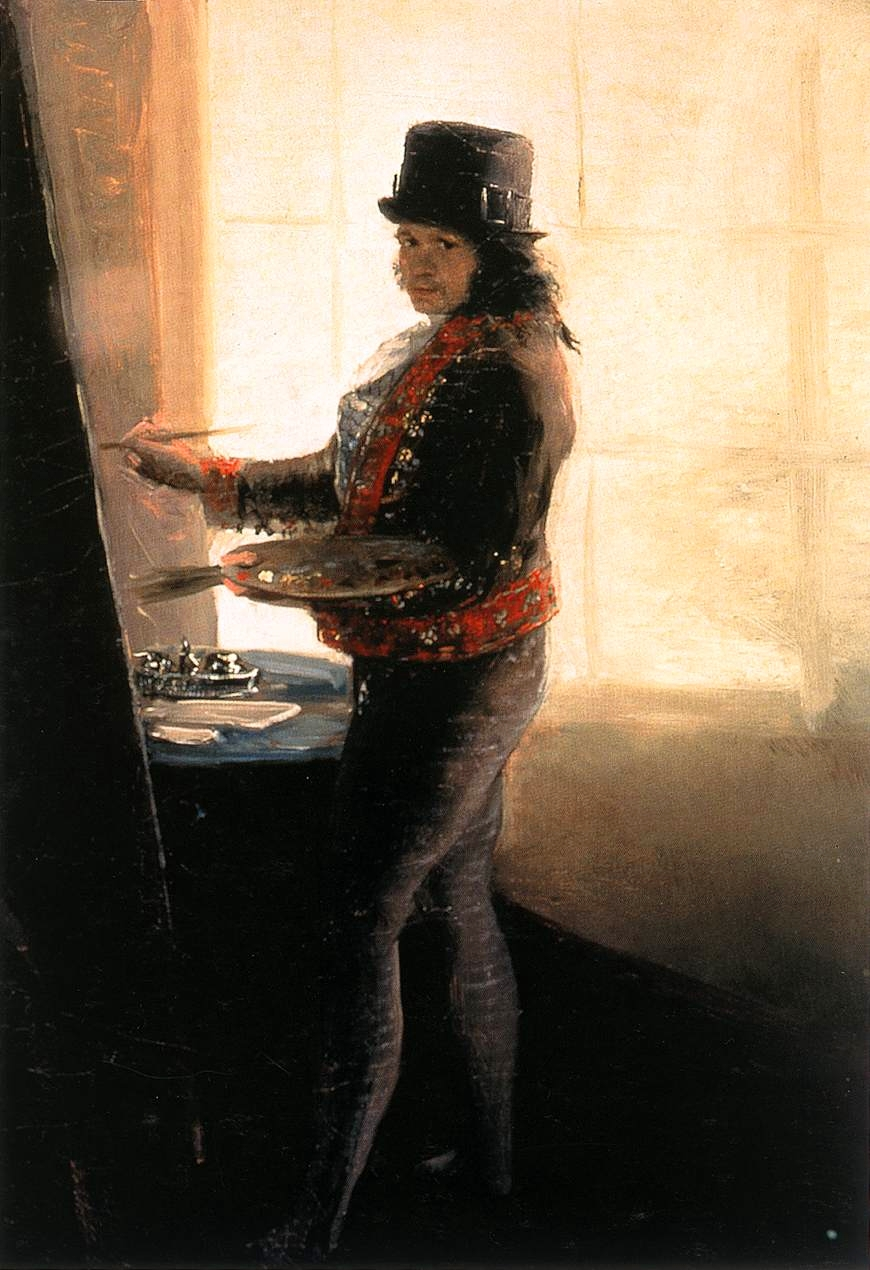
Self-portrait, 1790–1795, oil on canvas, 42 × 28 cm. In this painting Goya depicts himself in a bullfighter's suit

La Tauromaquia (Bullfighting) is a series of 33 prints created by the Spanish painter and printmaker Francisco Goya, which was published in 1816. The works of the series depict bullfighting scenes. There are also seven extra prints that were not published in the original edition.

== Background ==
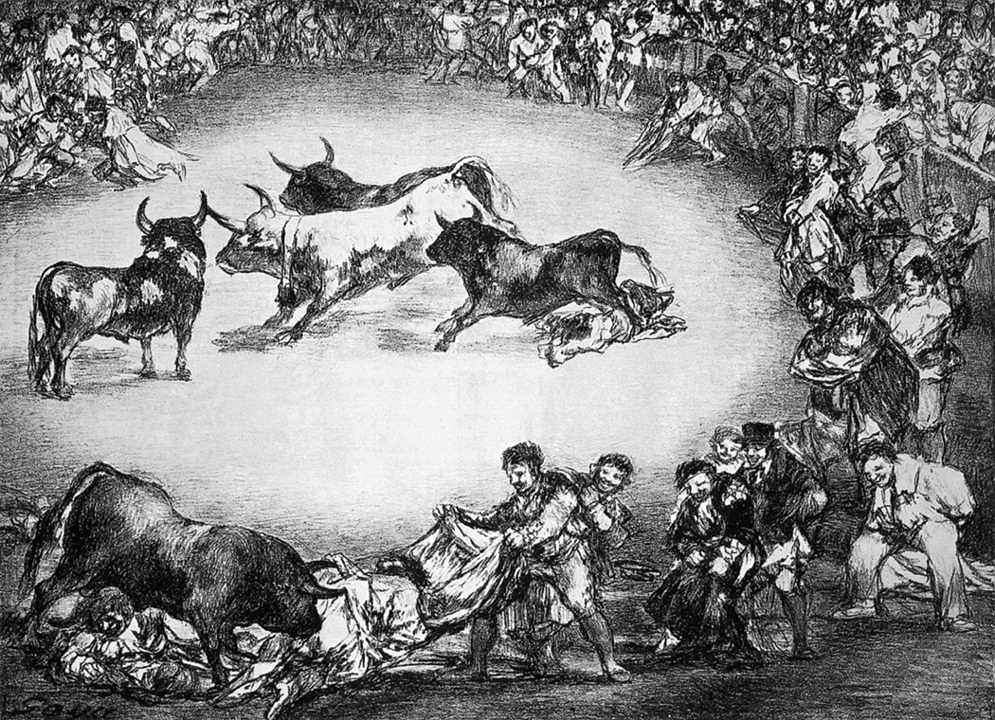
Spanish entertainment, 1825, lithograph, 30 × 41 εκ., Madrid, National Library. In this work from The Bulls of Bordeaux series, Goya presents bullfighting as a way of popular entertainment, and not as a violent event, as he does in Tauromaquia.

Goya created Tauromaquia between 1815 and 1816, at the age of 69, during a break from his famous series The Disasters of War. The Disasters of War and the Caprichos, the series he had created previously, served as visual criticism on subjects concerning war, superstition, and contemporary Spanish society generally, including anticlerical scenes. Because of their sensitive subjects, few people had seen these works during Goya's lifetime.

Bullfighting was not politically sensitive, and the series was published at the end of 1816 in an edition of 320—for sale individually or in sets—without incident. It did not meet with critical or commercial success. Goya was always charmed by bullfighting, a theme that obviously inspired him, since it was the subject of many of his works: in a self-portrait (c 1790–1795) he depicted himself in a bullfighter's suit; in 1793 he completed a series of eight paintings on tinplate, created for the Royal Academy of Fine Arts of San Fernando, which depicted scenes from bulls' lives from the moment of their birth to the time they enter the bullring; in 1825 he made the series Los toros de Burdeos (The Bulls of Bordeaux; 1825), of which Delacroix purchased a copy. Indicative of his love for bulls is the fact that he signed one of his letters as Francisco de los Toros (Francisco of the Bulls).

== The works ==
Goya used mainly the techniques of etching and aquatint in this series. The artist focuses on the violent scenes that take place in the bullring and the daring movements of the bullfighters. The events are not presented as they are viewed by a viewer in the stands, but in a more direct way, in contrast with The Bulls of Bordeaux where the events are presented as a means of popular entertainment.

== Interpretations ==
Janis Tomlinson, an internationally recognized art historian and Goya scholar, recognizes that in plate No. 33, "[t]he eventually published title, identifies the bull fighter as Pepe Illo. A fighter who met end in the ring of Madrid in May 1801". The name, Pepe, is a diminutive for the name Joseph. It is interpreted that Pepe represents Joseph Bonaparte, the former king of Spain.

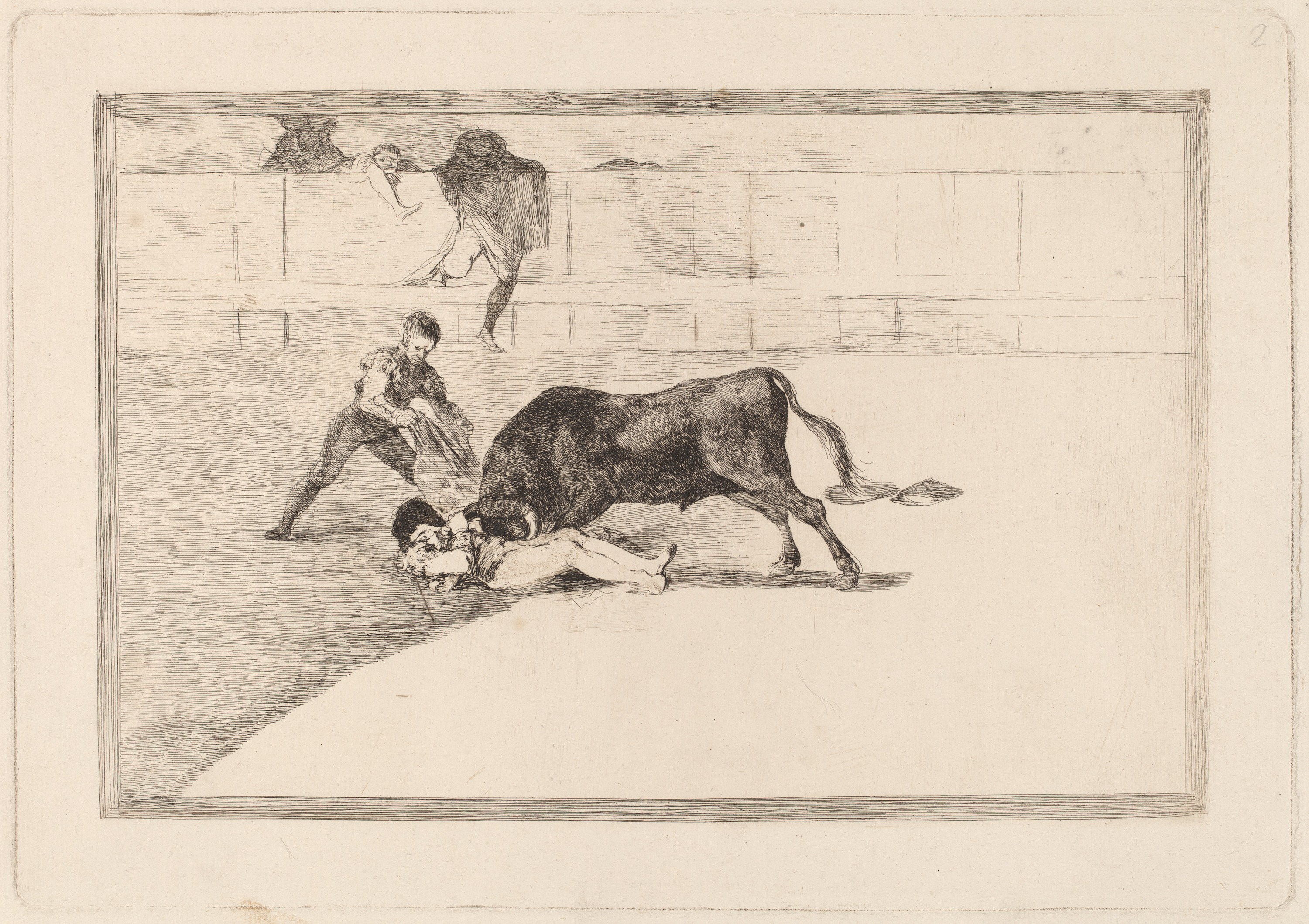
Goya - La desgraciada muerte de Pepe Illo en la plaza de Madrid

== Works ==
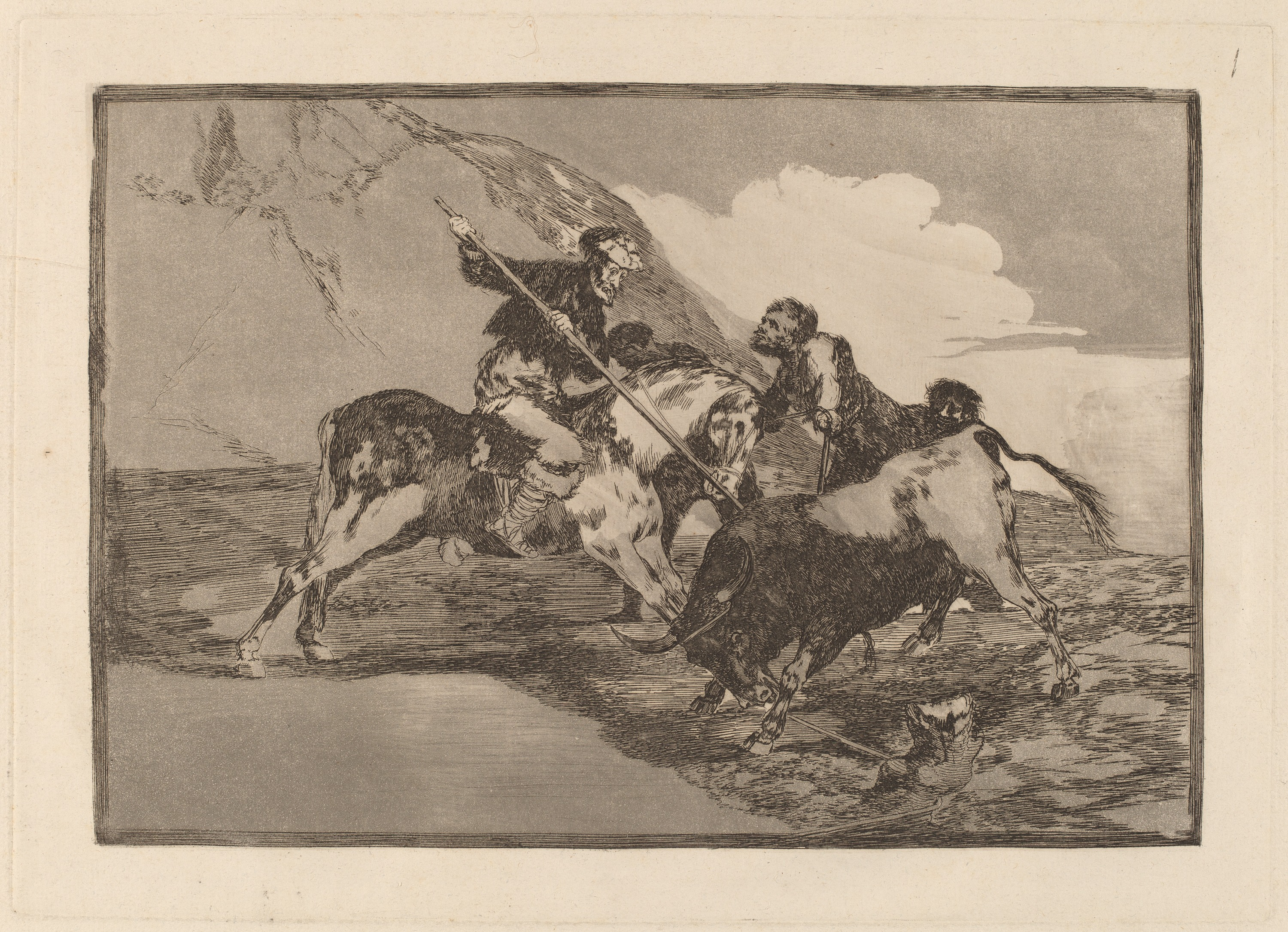
Νο. 1: Modo con que los antiguos Espanoles cazaban los toros a caballo en el campo ("How the ancient Spanish hunted the bulls on horse in the field")

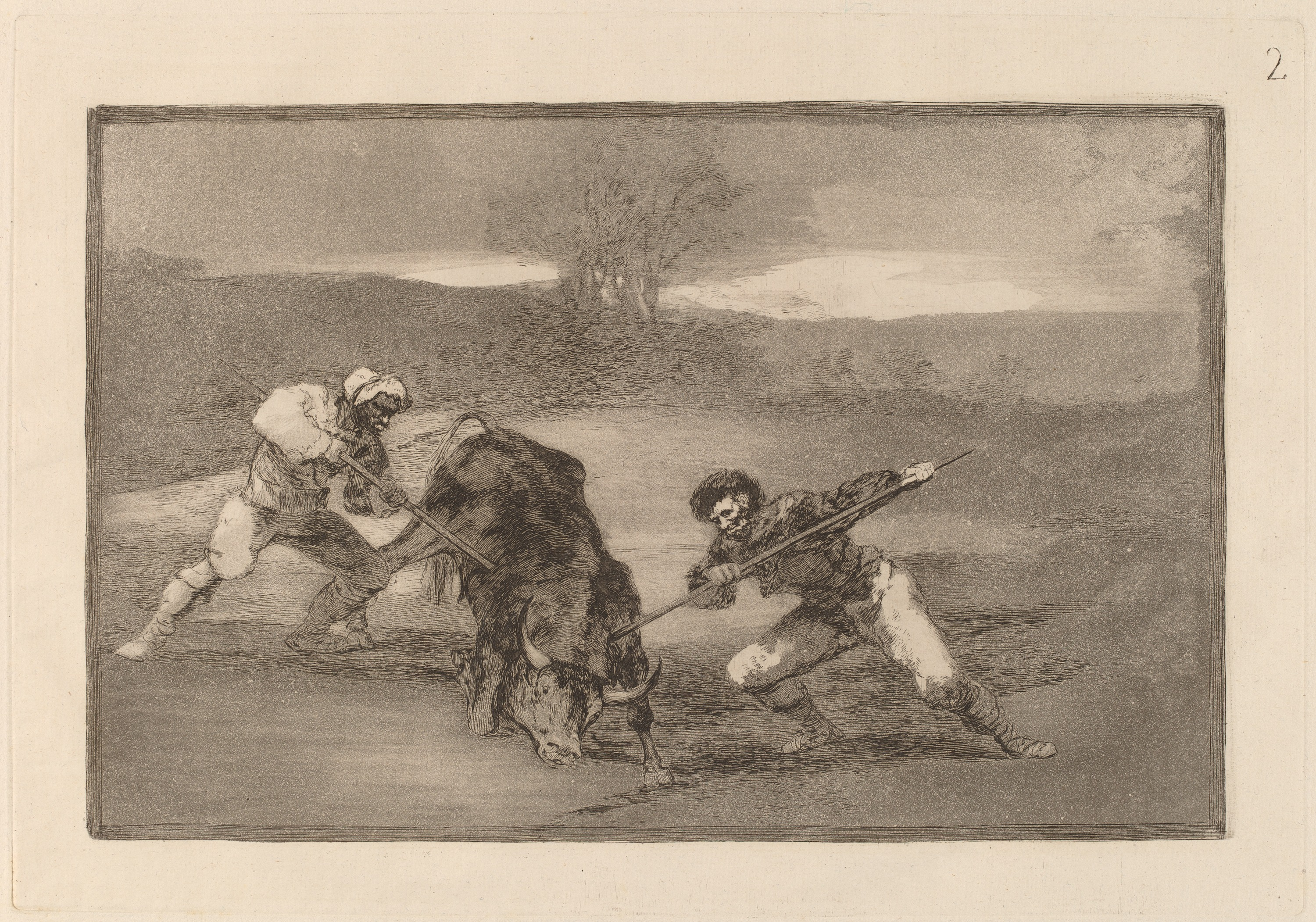
Νο. 2: Otro modo de cazar a pie ("Another way of hunting on foot")

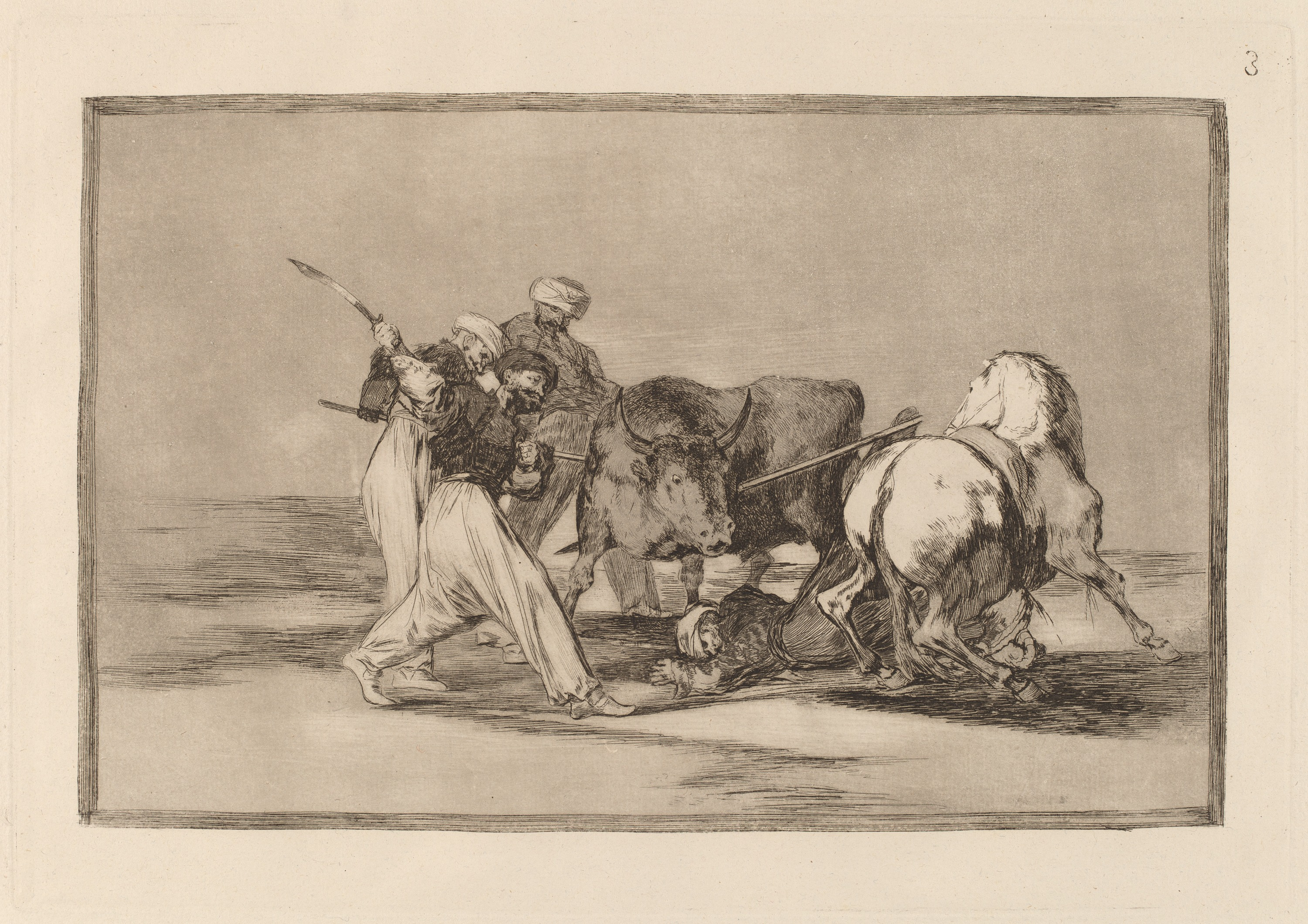
Νο. 3: Los moros establecidos en España, prescindiendo de las supersticiones de su Alcorán, adoptaron esta caza y arte, y lancean un toro en el campo. ("The Moors established in Spain, prescinding of the superstitions of their Quran, adopted this hunt and art, and they spear a bull on the field")

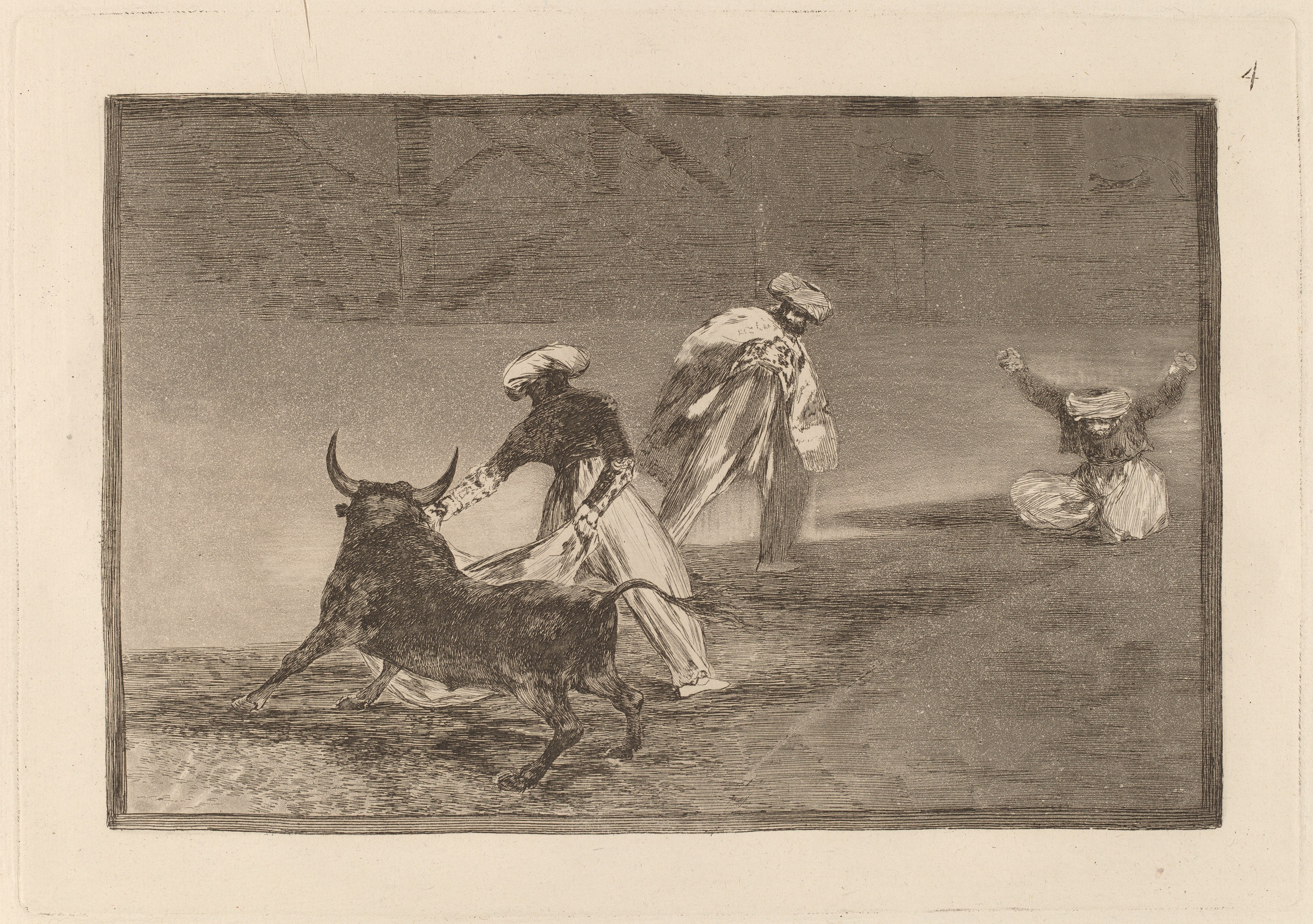
Νο. 4: Capean otro encerrado ("Another one is caped")

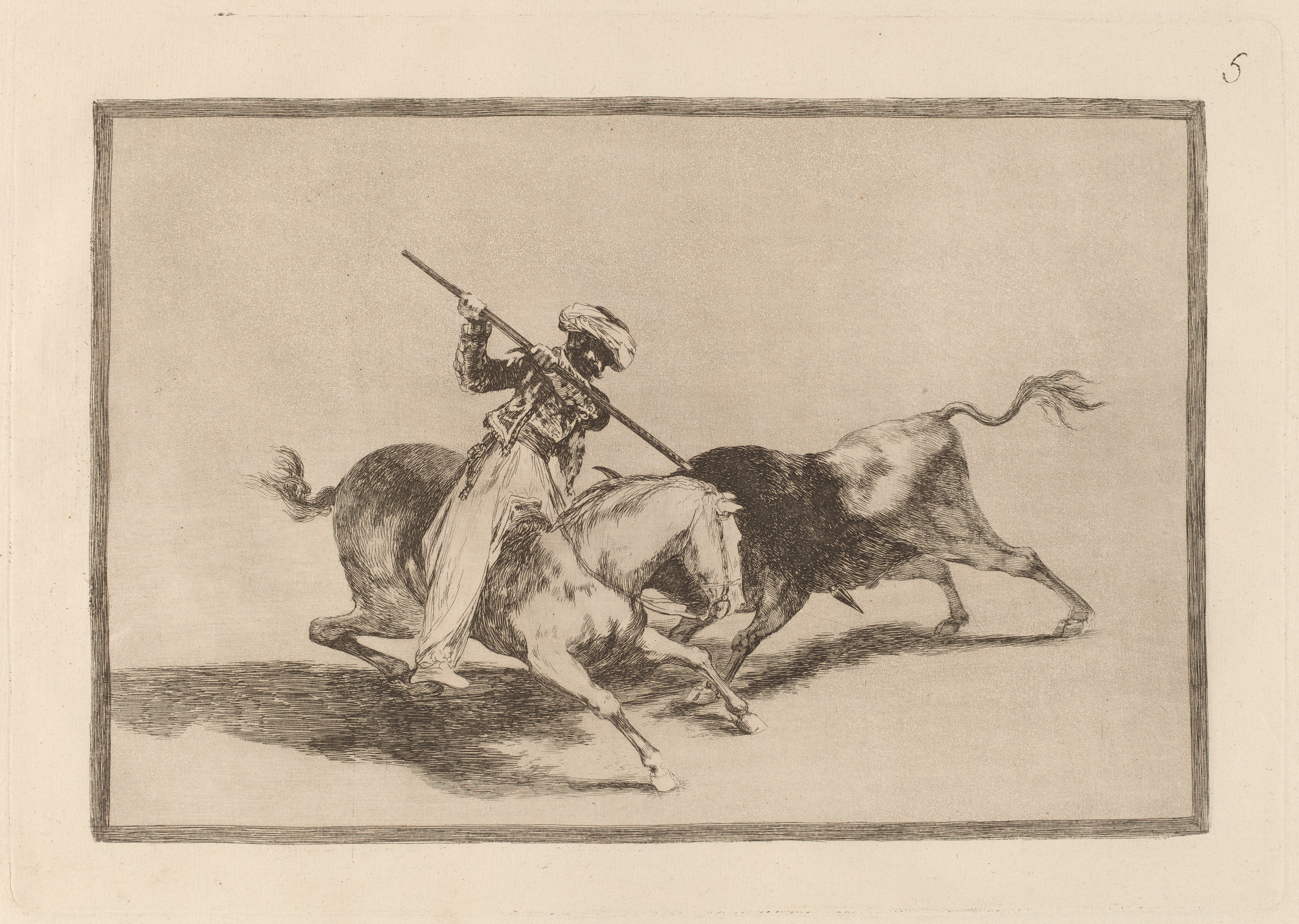
Νο. 5: El animoso moro Gazul es el primero que lanceó toros en regla ("The animous Moor Gazul was the first to spear bulls in horseback")

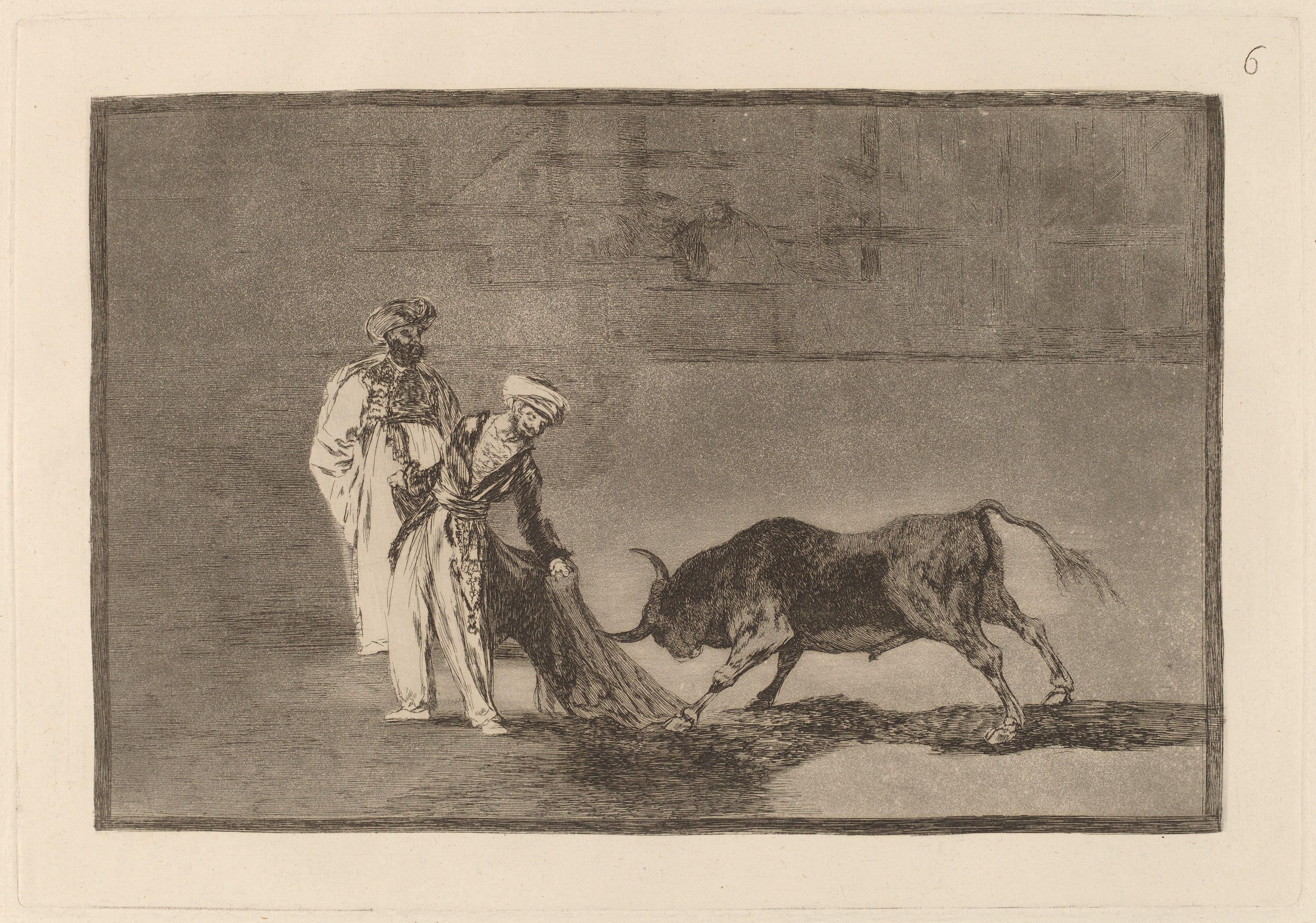
Νο. 6: Los Moros hacen otro capeo en plaza con su albornoz ("The Moors do another caping in the plaza with their bournouses")

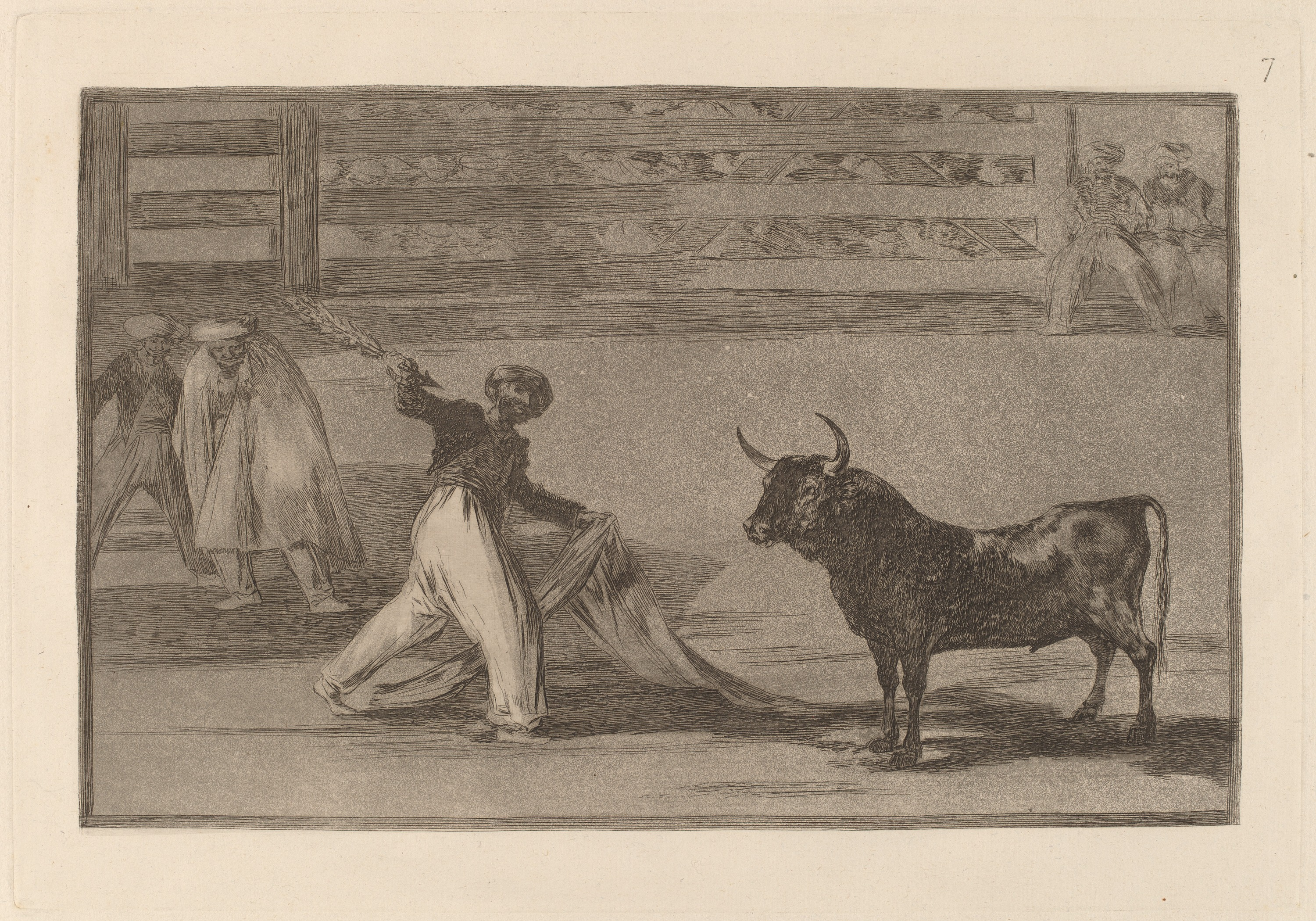
Νο. 7: Origen de los arpones o banderillas ("Origin of the harpoons or banderillas")

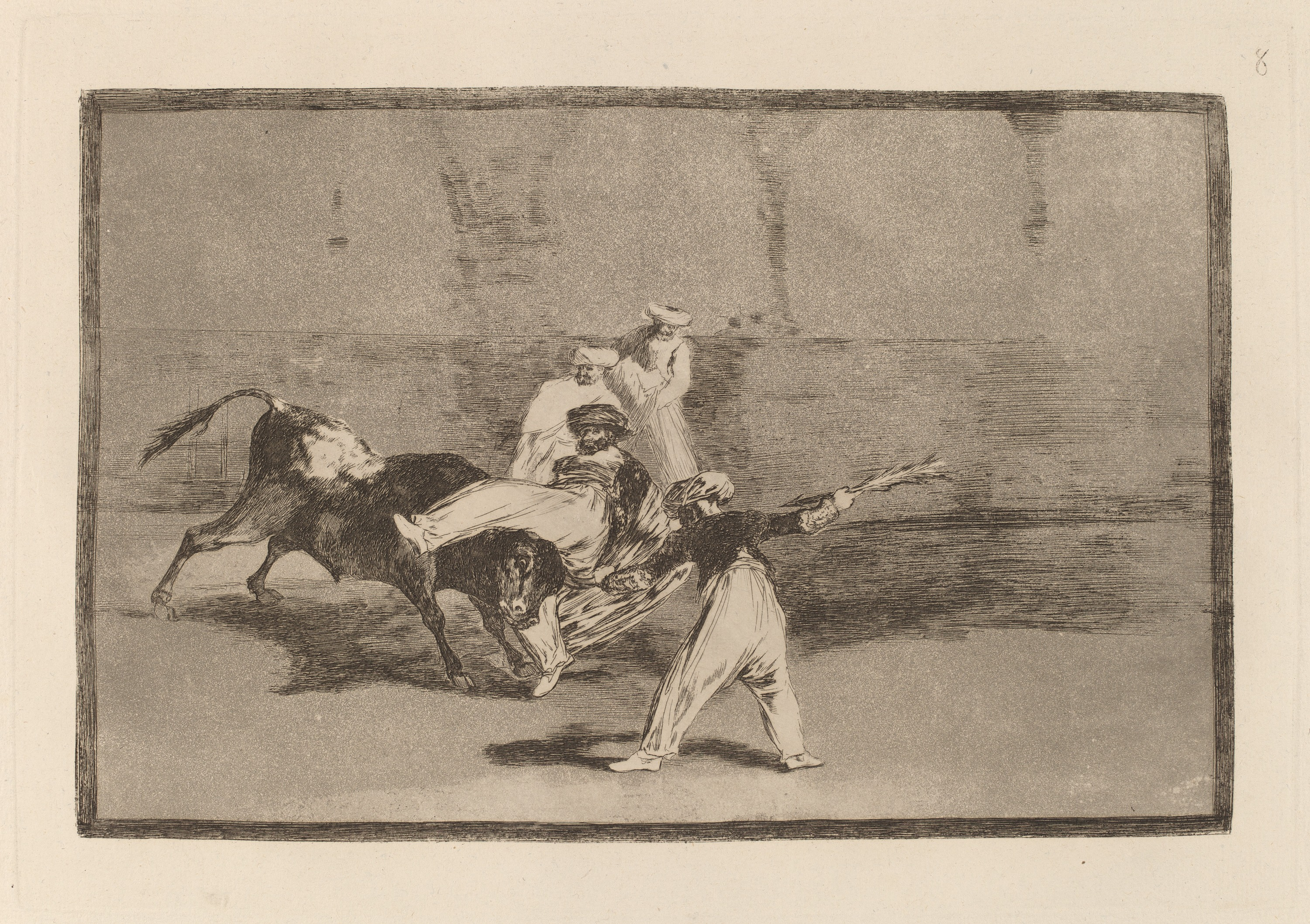
Νο. 8: Cogida de un moro estando en la plaza ("A Moor getting caught while in the plaza")

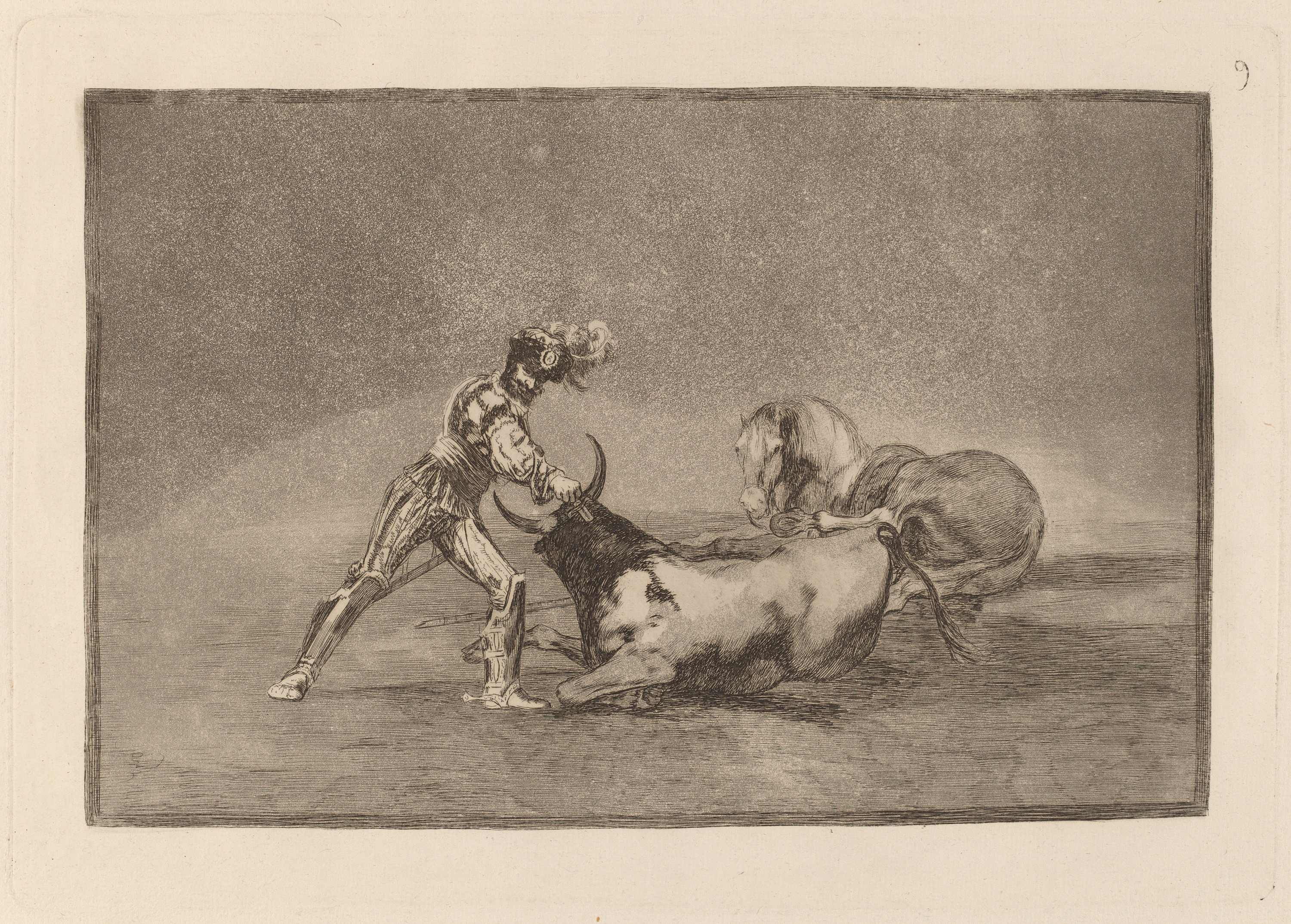
Νο. 9: Un caballero español mata un toro después de haber perdido el caballo ("A Spanish knight kills a bull after his horse is wounded")

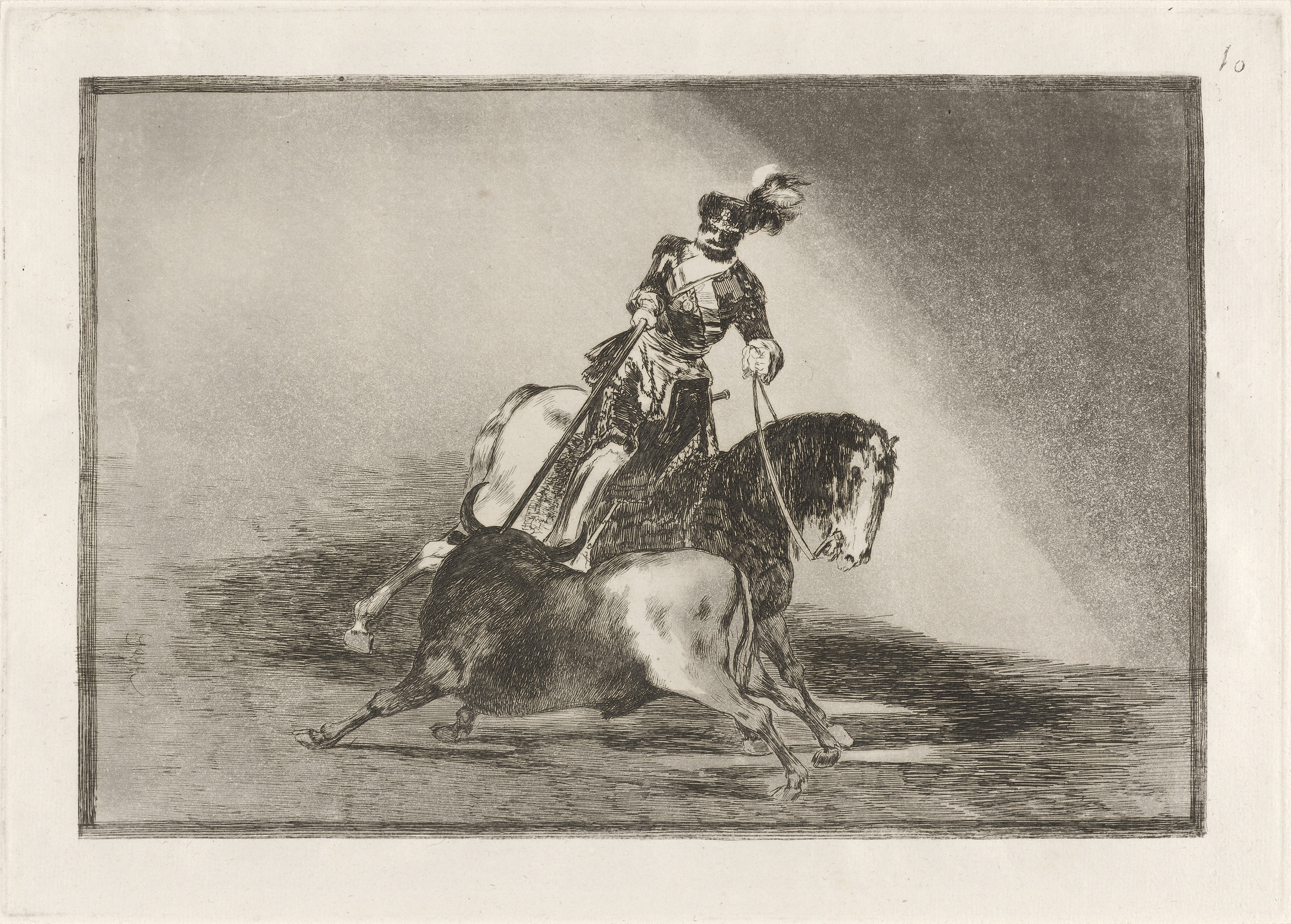
Νο. 10: Carlos V. lanceando un toro en la plaza de Valladolid ("Carlos V spearing a bull in the plaza of Valladolid")

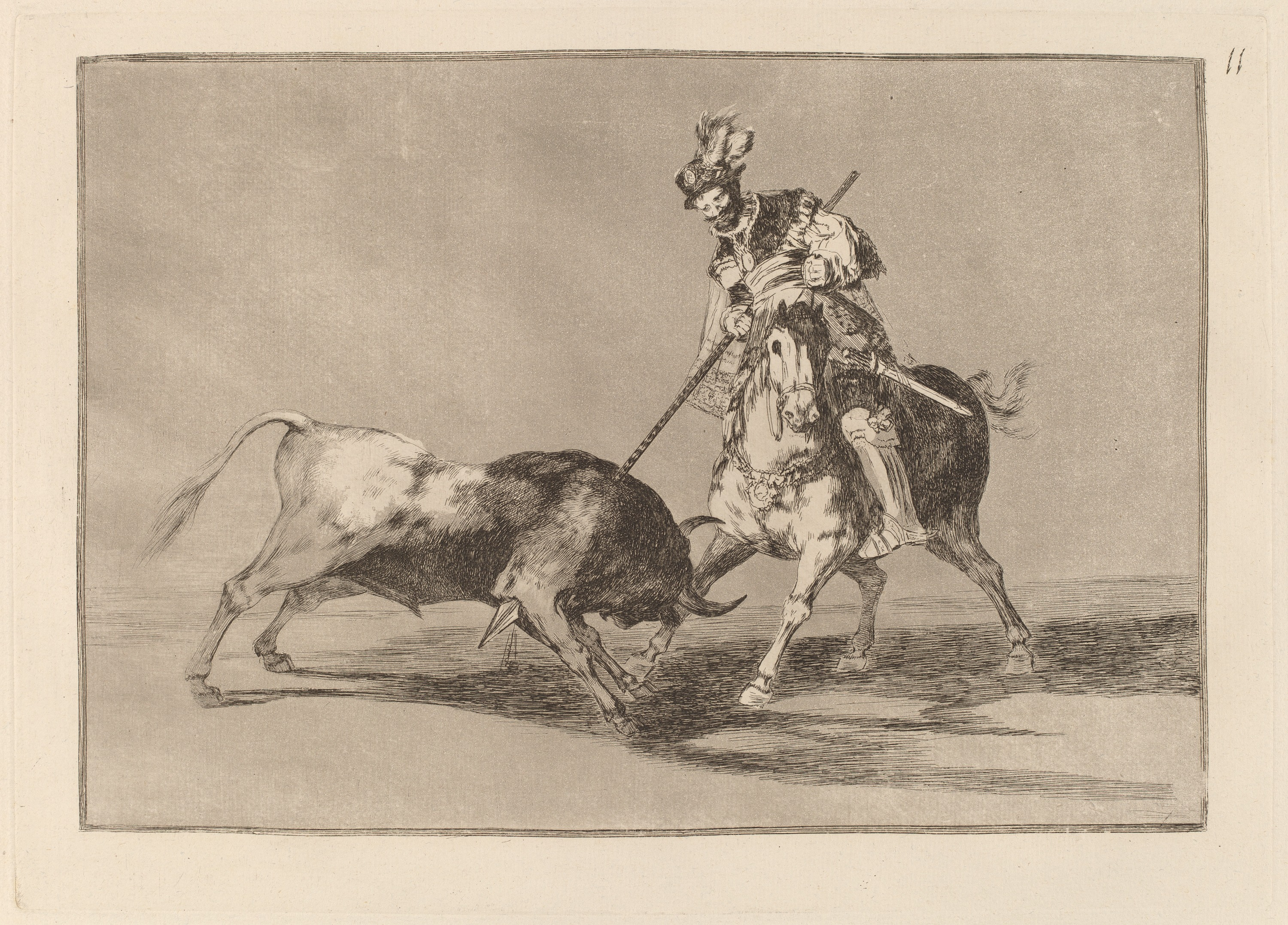
Νο. 11: El Cid Campeador lanceando otro toro ("El Cid spearing another bull")

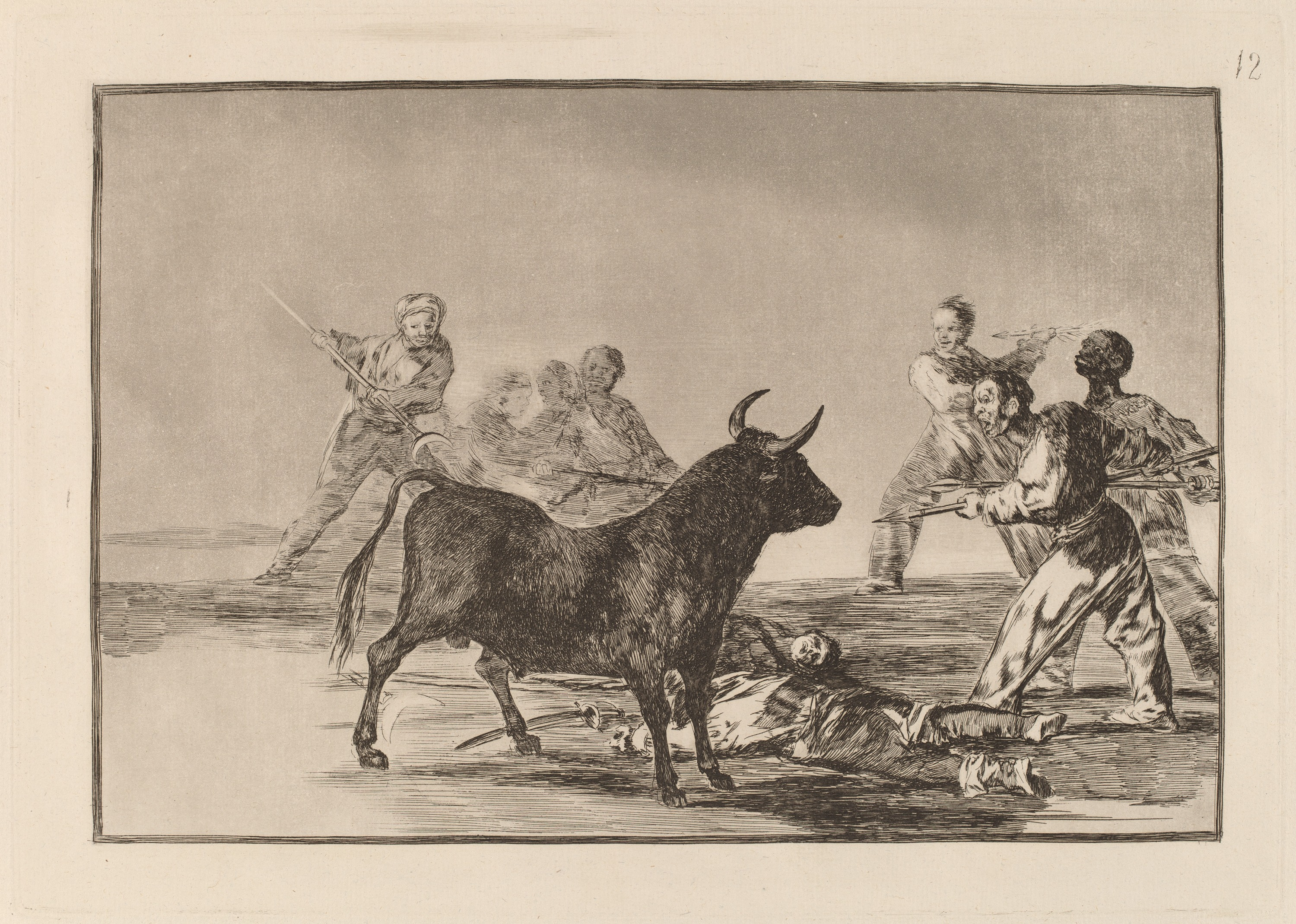
Νο. 12: Desjarrete de la canalla con lanzas, medias-lunas, banderillas y otras armas ("Slashing of the leg with spears, half-moons, banderillas, and other weapons")

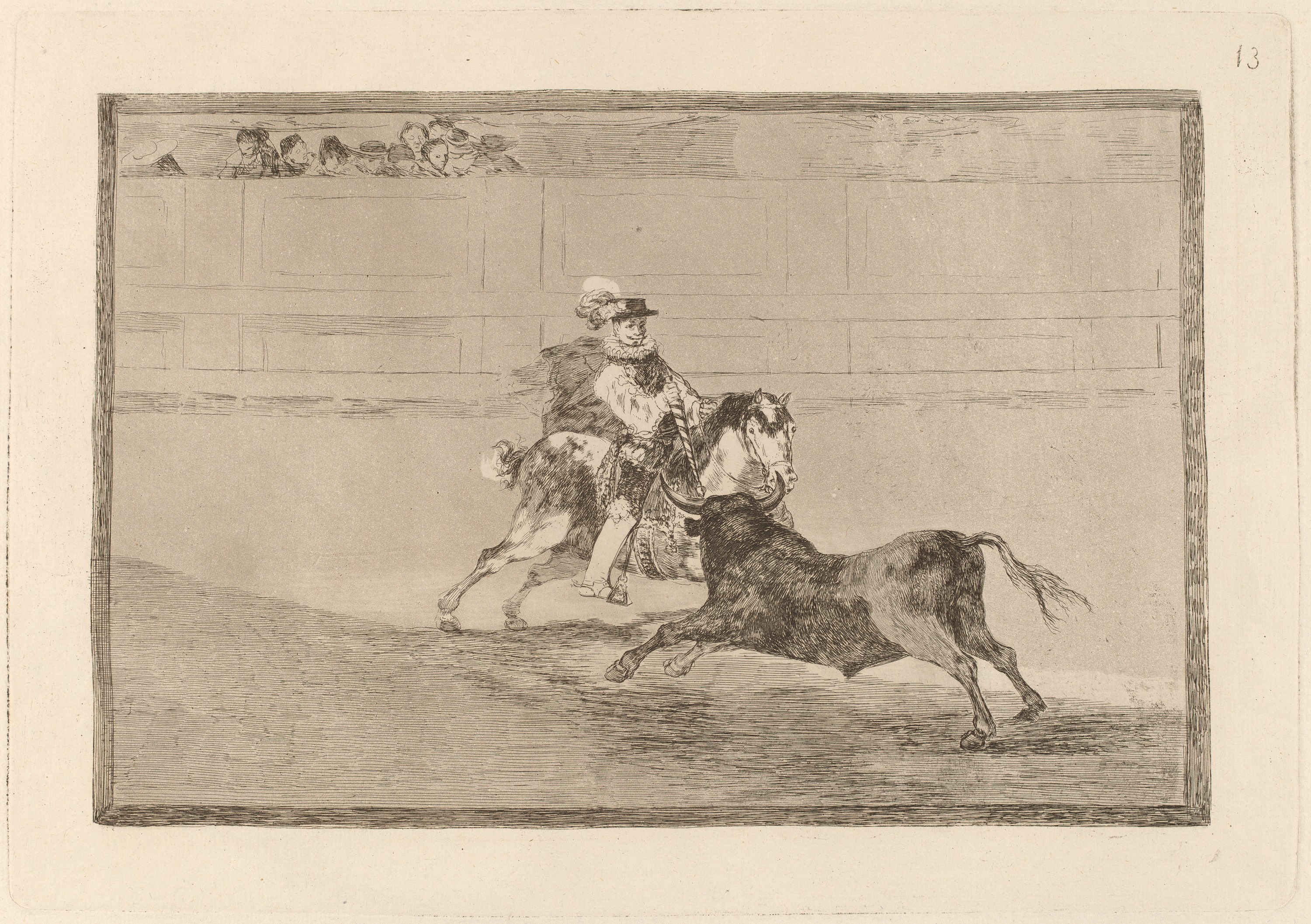
Νο. 13: Un caballero español en plaza quebrando rejoncillos sin auxilio de los chulos (A Spanish knight in the plaza, breaking his spears without being helped by the "chulos")

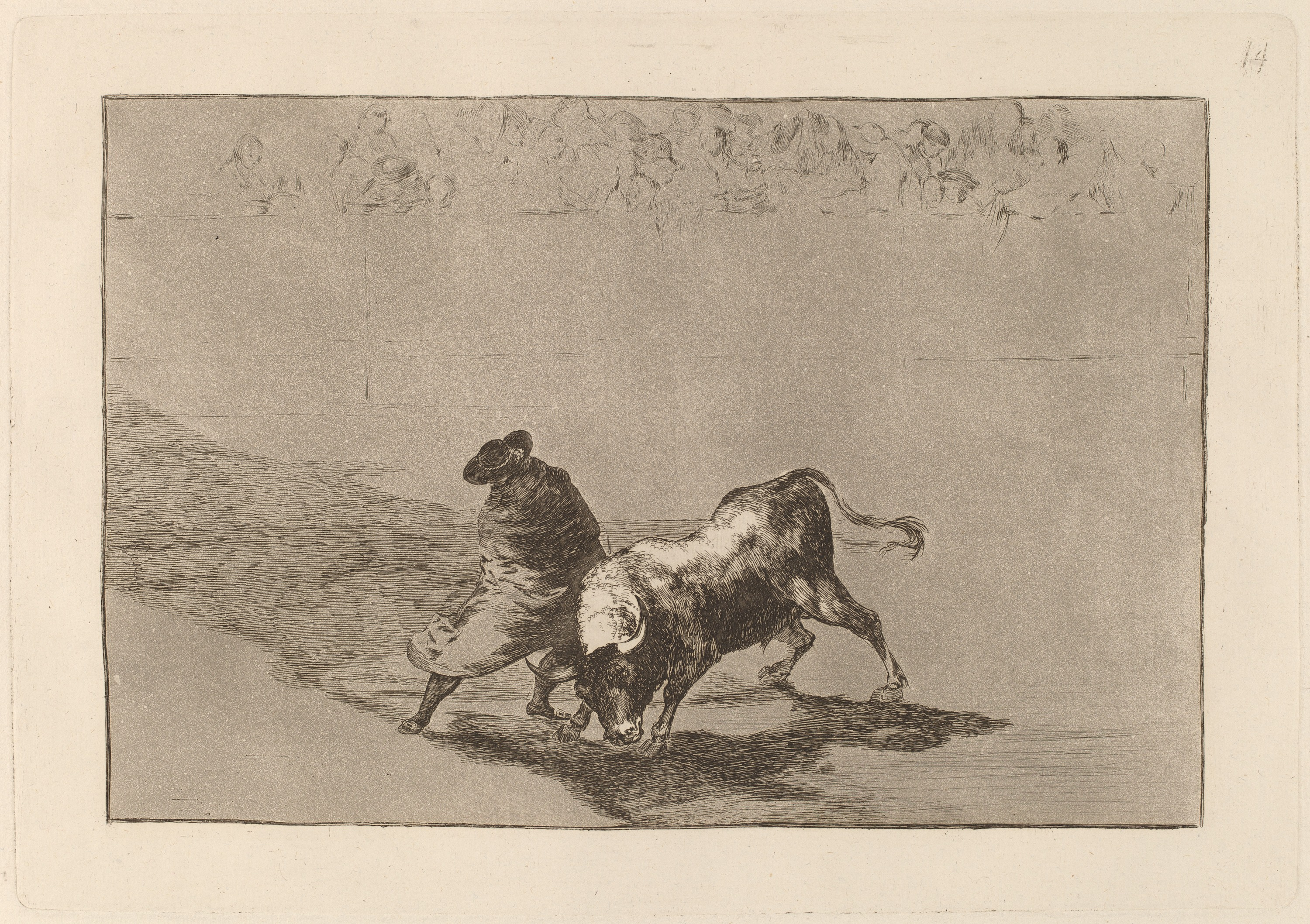
Νο. 14: El diestrisimo estudiante de Falces, embozado, burla al toro con sus quiebros ("The dexterous student of Falces, embossed, tricks the bull with his breaks")

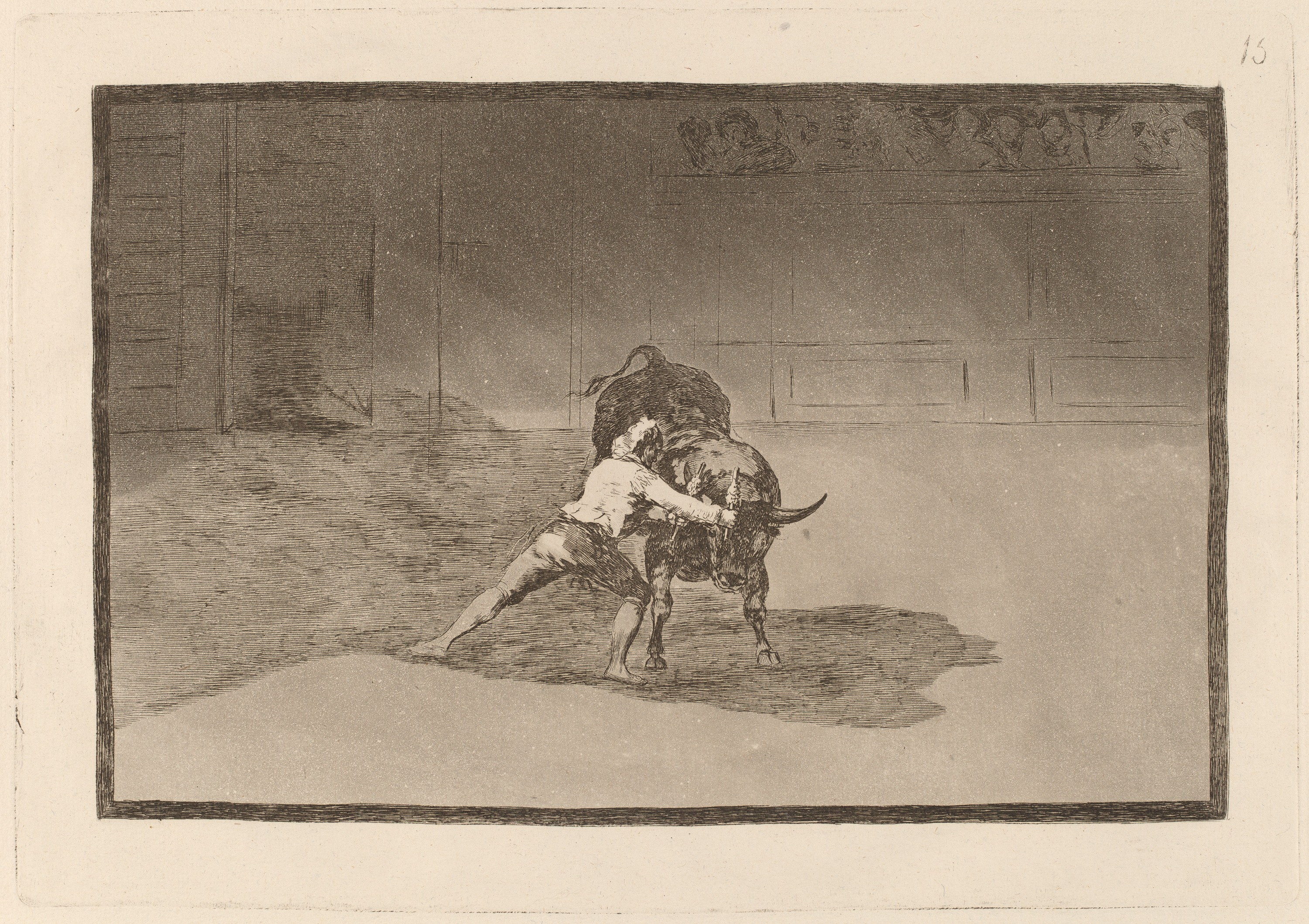
Νο. 15: El famoso Martincho poniendo banderillas al quiebro ("The famous Martincho putting banderillas while breaking")

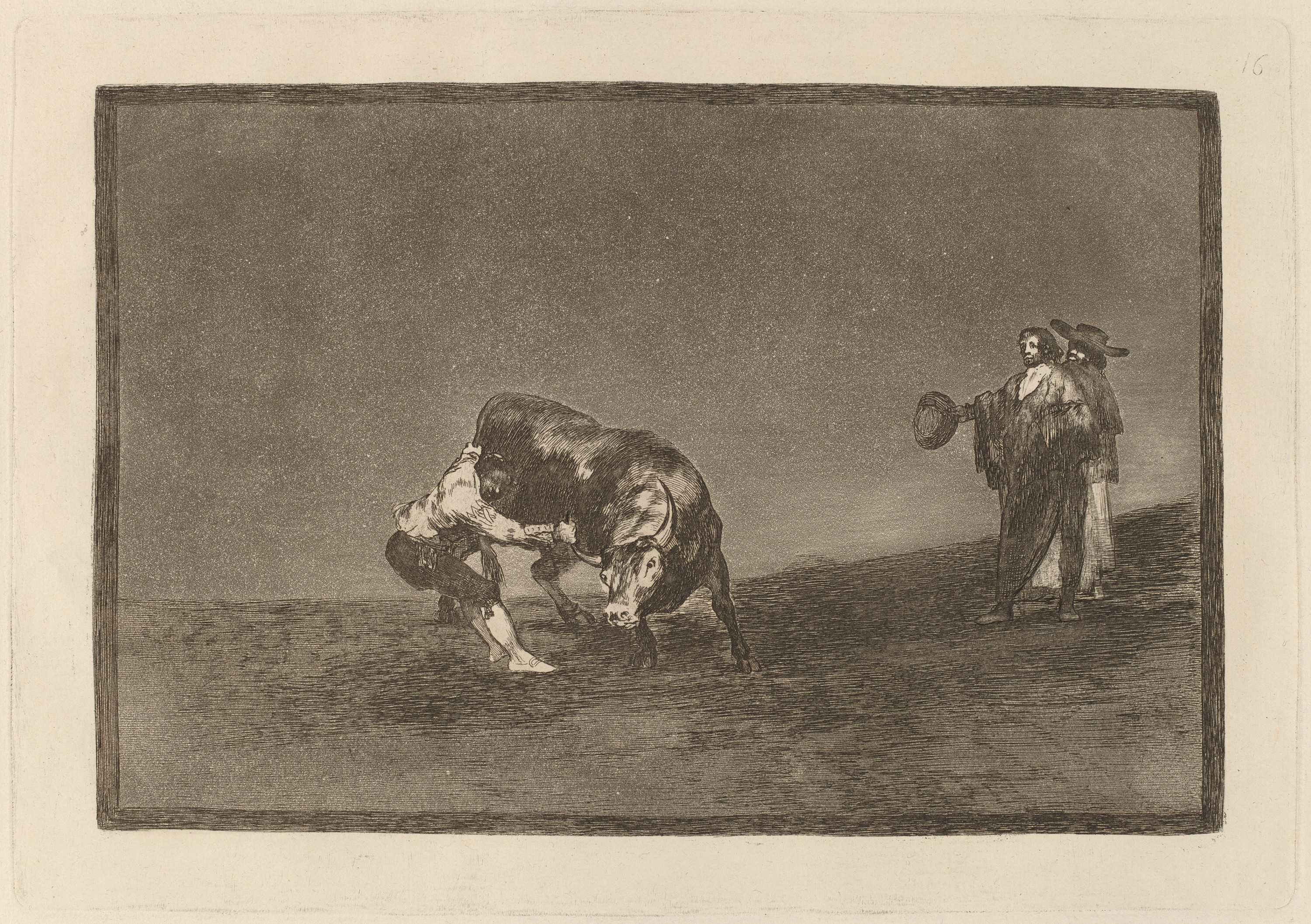
Νο. 16: El mismo vuelca un toro en la plaza de Madrid ("He turns a bull upside down by himself in Madrid's plaza")

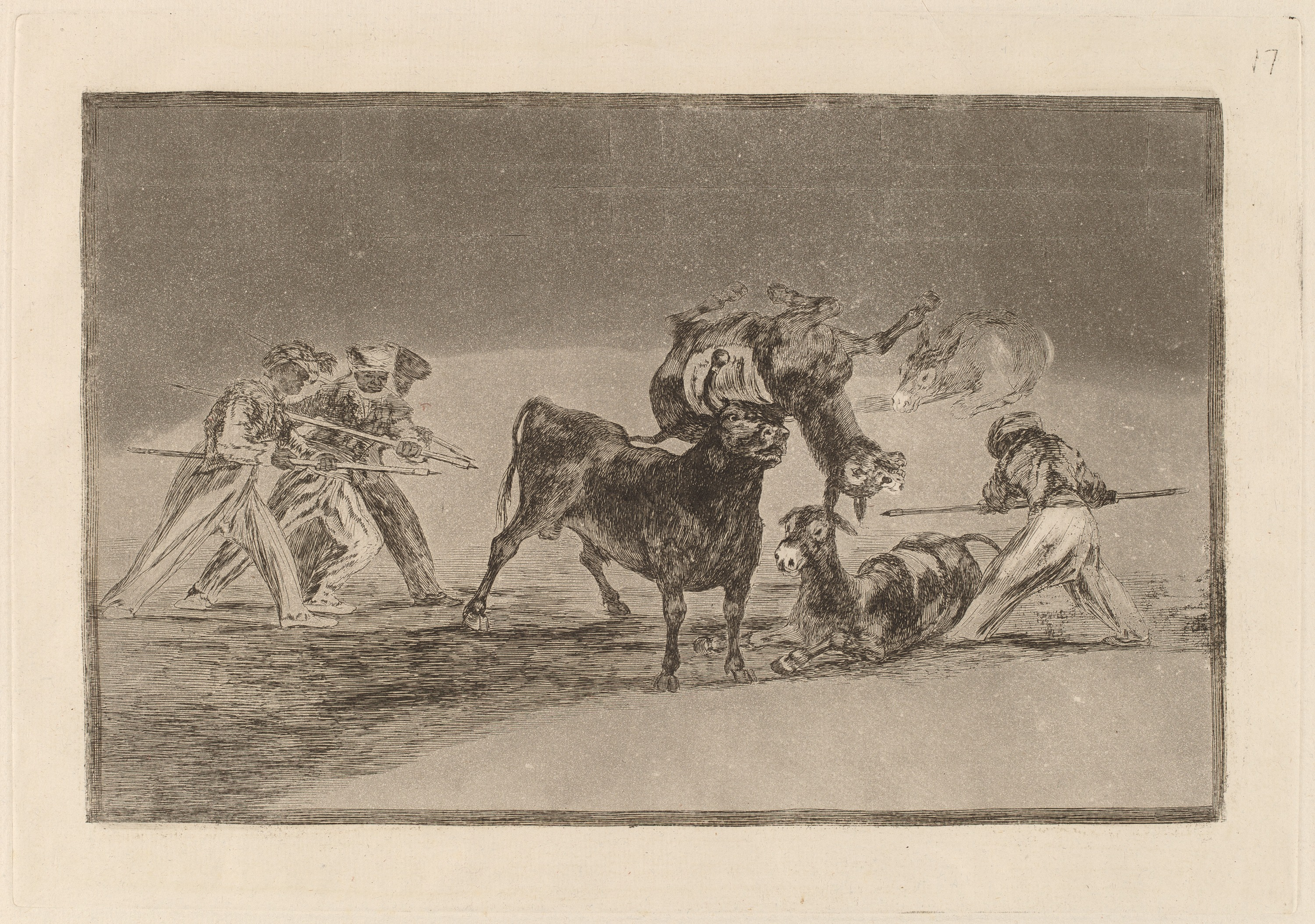
Νο. 17: Palenque de los moros hecho con burros para defenderse del toro embolado ("Palisade of the Moors made with donkeys to defend themselves of the enraged bull")

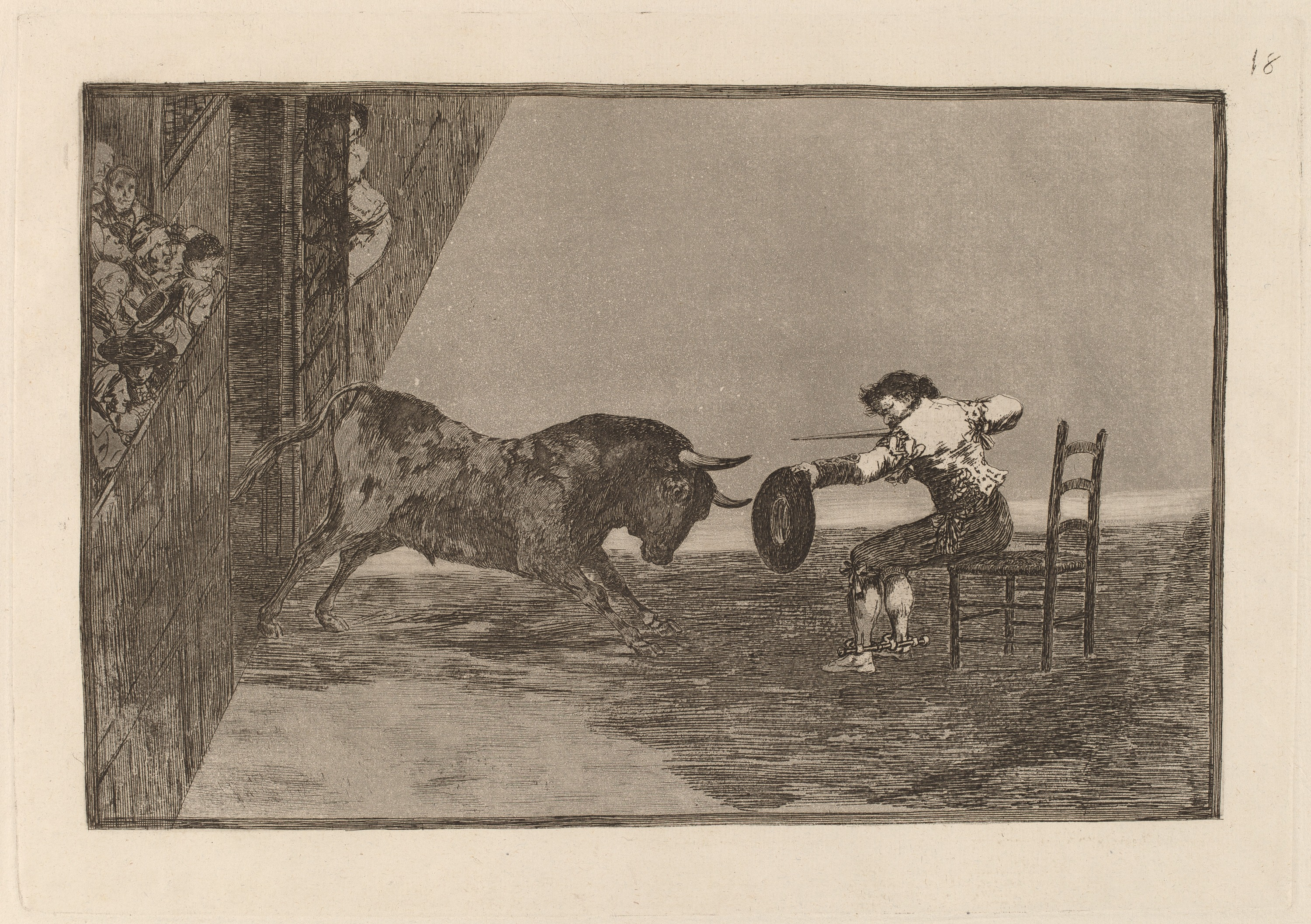
Νο. 18: Temeridad de Martincho en la plaza de Zaragoza ("Temerity of Martincho in Zaragoza's plaza")

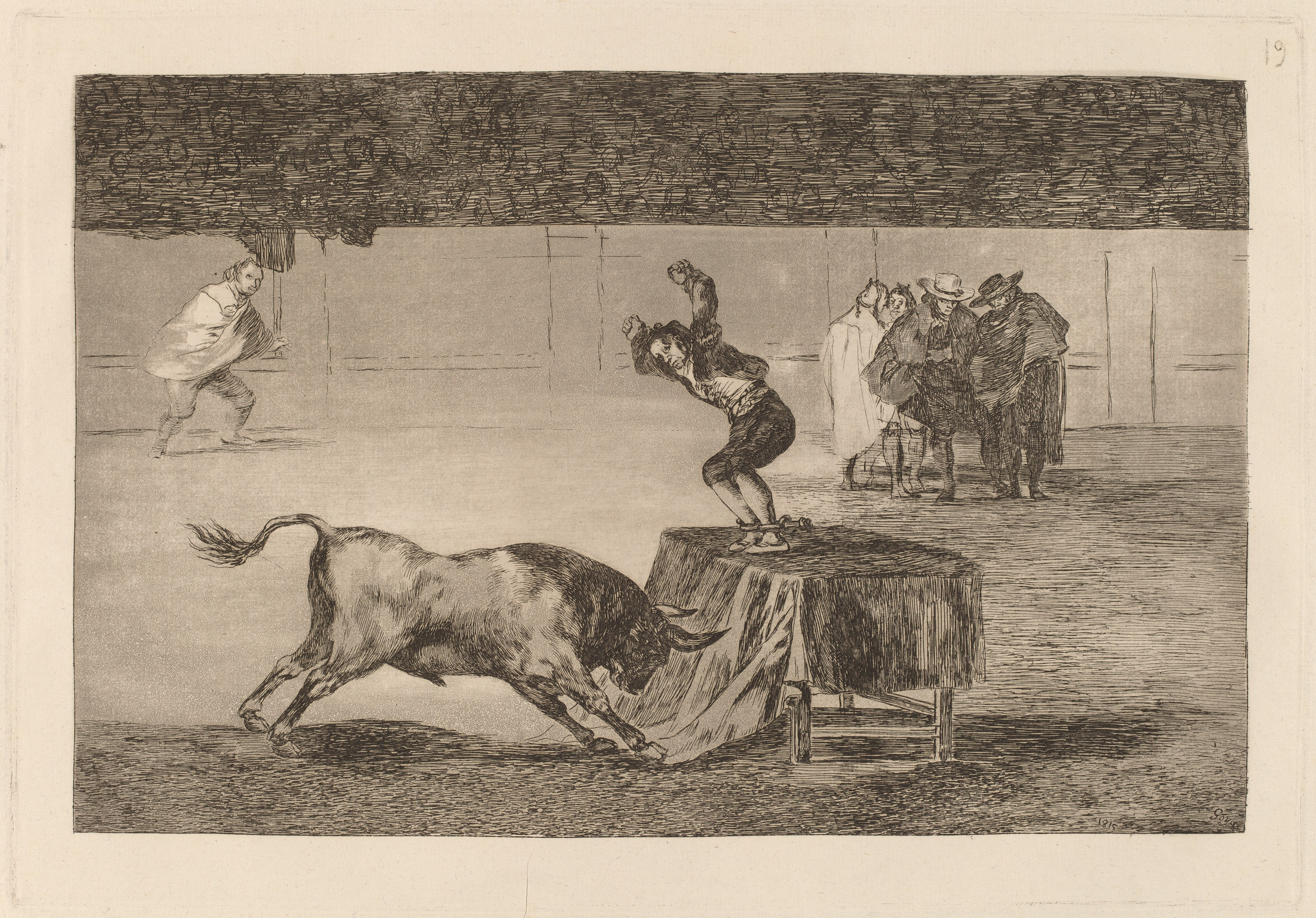
Νο. 19: Otra locura suya en la misma plaza ("More of his madness in the same plaza")

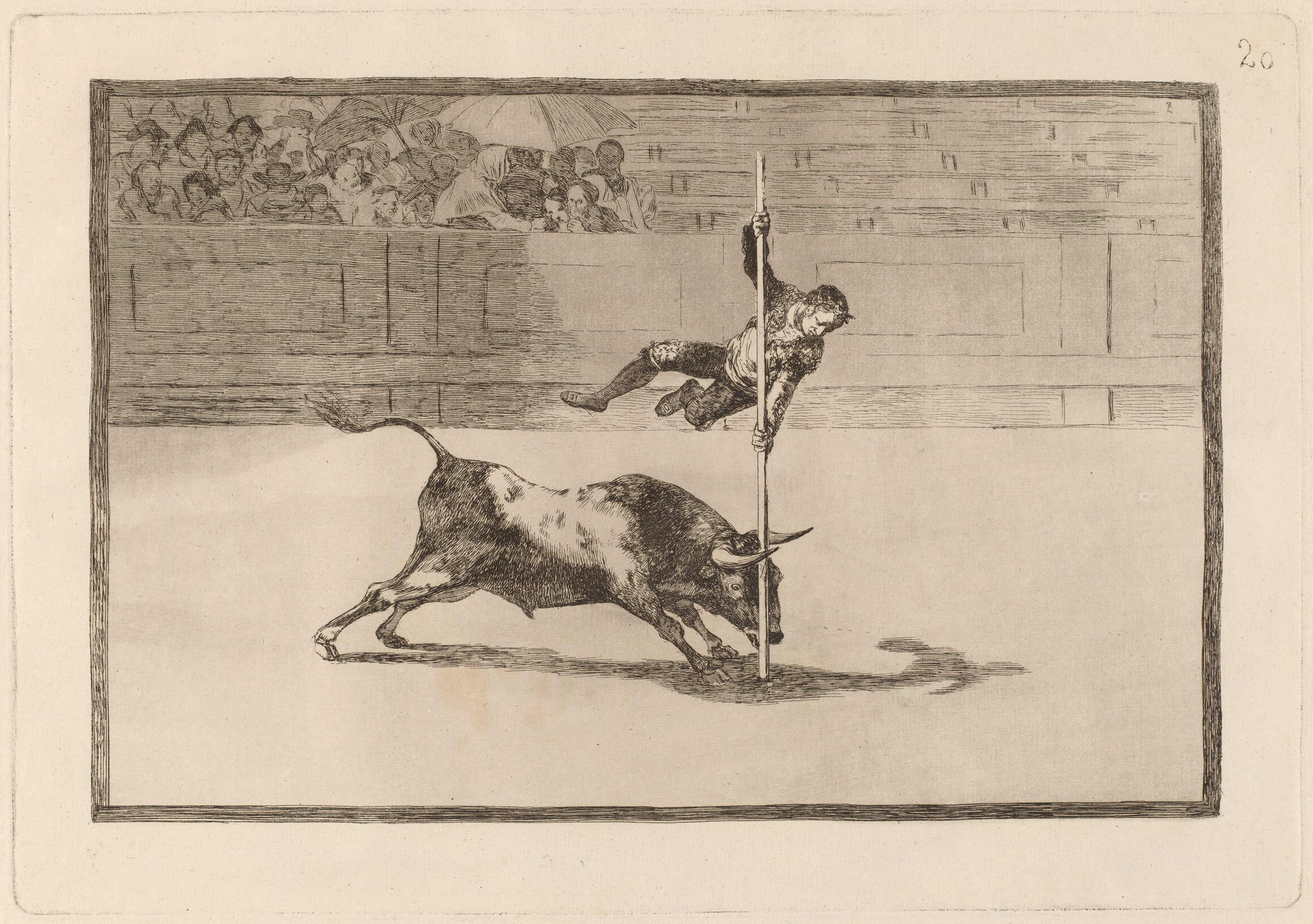
Νο. 20: Ligereza y atrevimiento de Juanito Apiñani en la de Madrid ("Lightness and boldness of Juanito Apiñani in Madrid's ("plaza"))

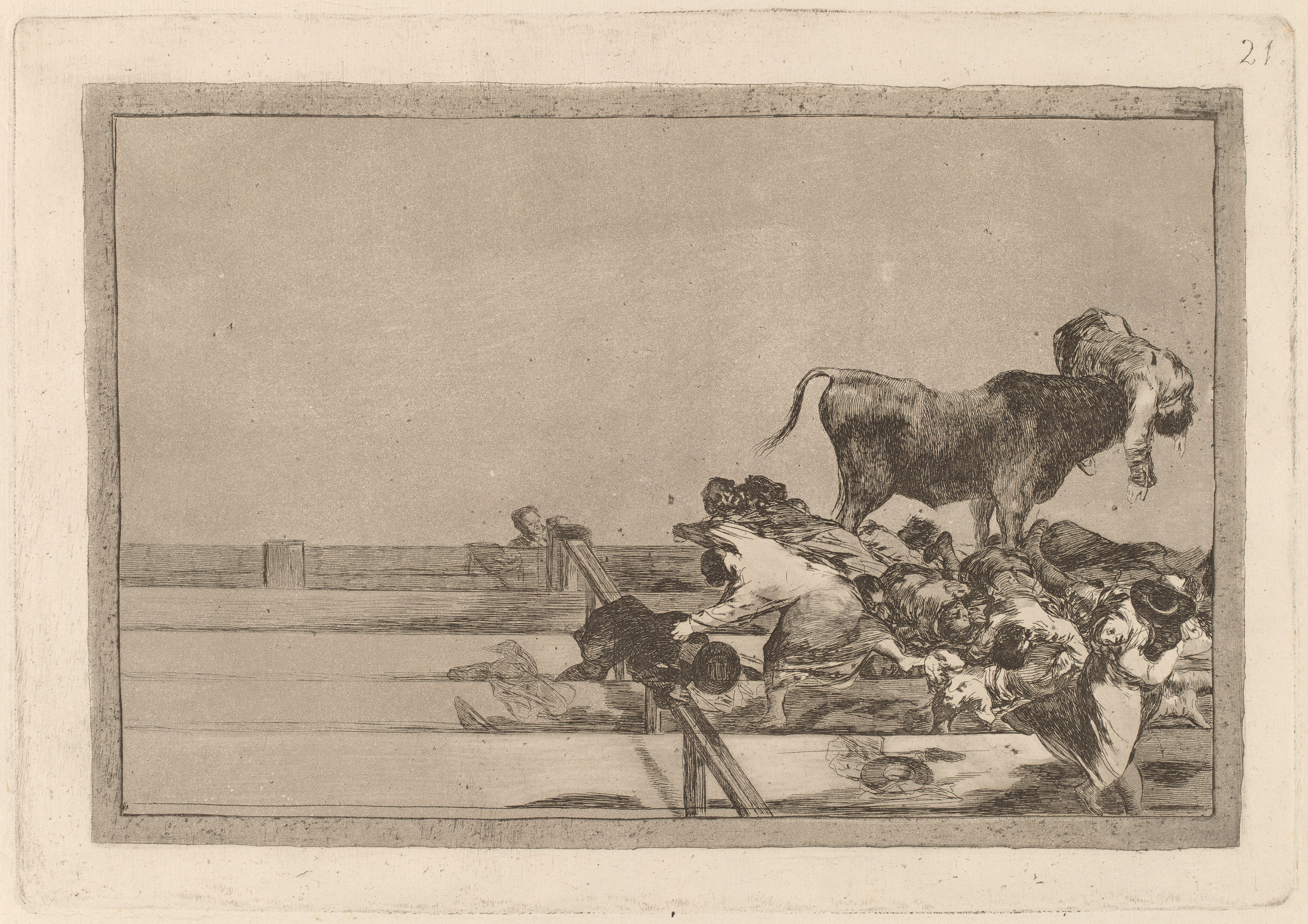
Νο. 21: "Desgracias acaecidas en el tendido de la plaza de Madrid, y muerte del alcalde de Torrejón" ("Befallen disgraces in the front seats of the plaza of Madrid, and the death of the Mayor of Torrejón")

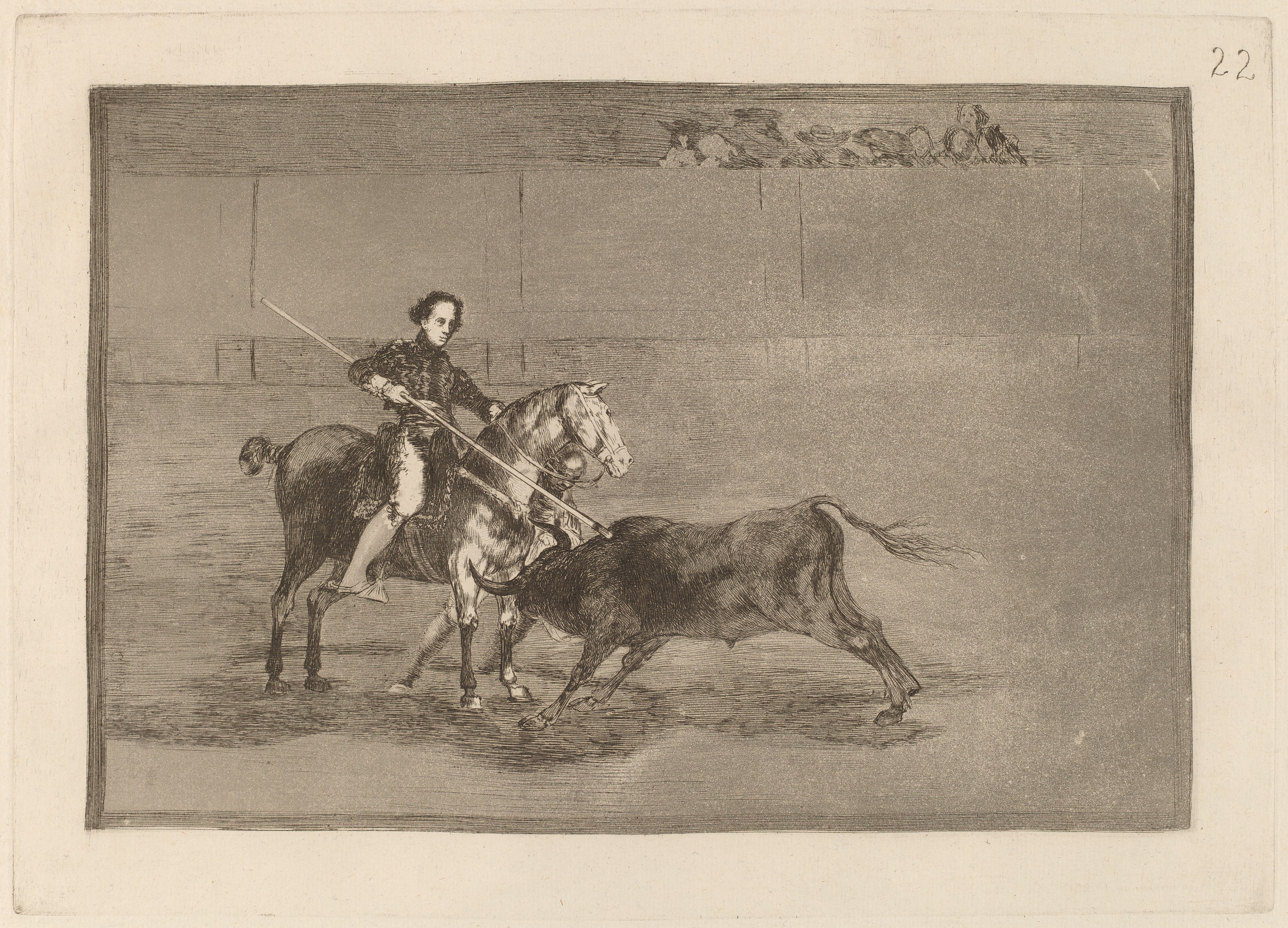
Νο. 22: Valor varonil de la celebre Pajuelera en la de Zaragoza ("Manly valour of the celebrity Pajuelera in Zaragoza's ("Plaza") )

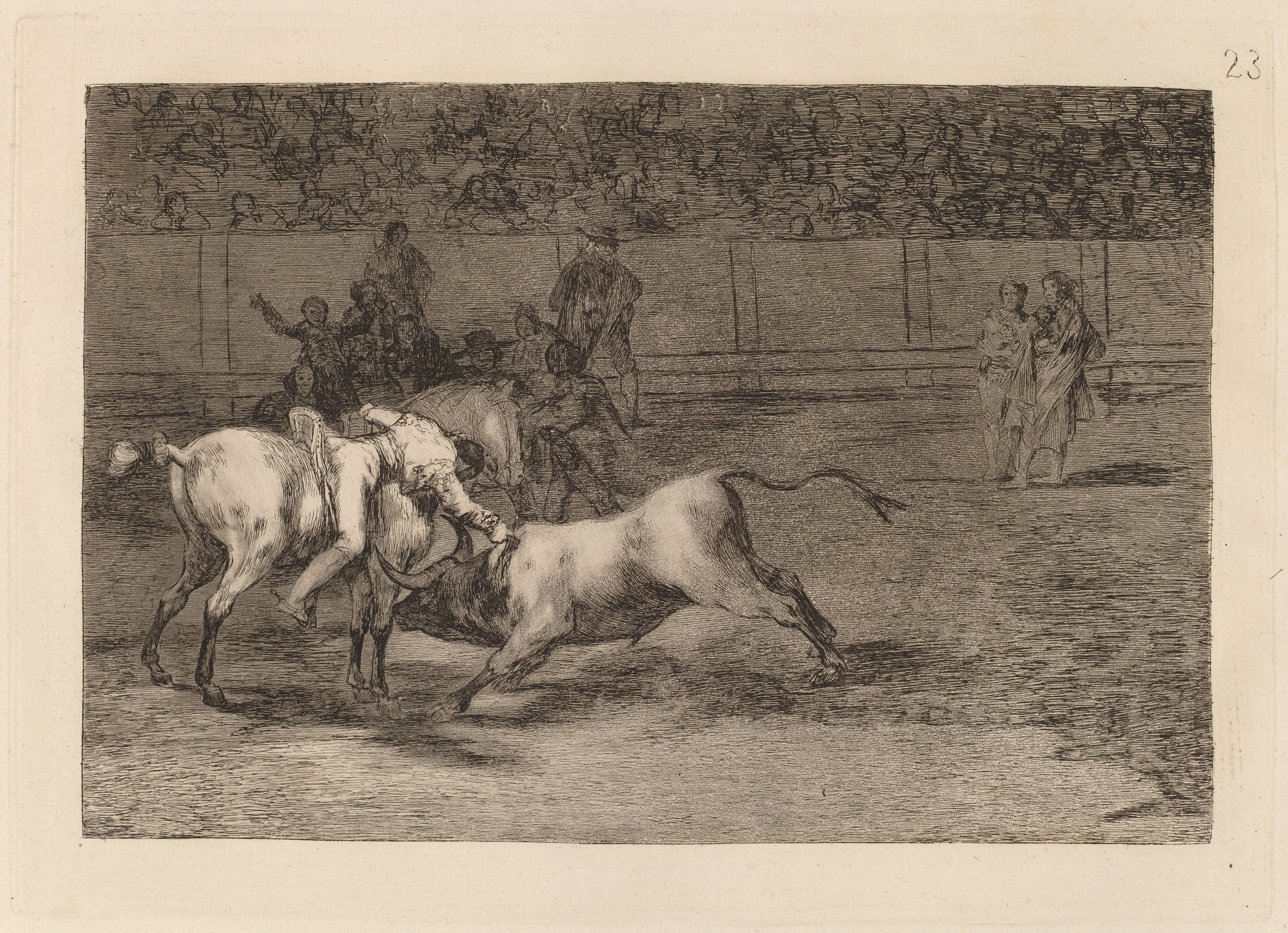
Νο. 23: Mariano Ceballos, alias "El Indio", mata el toro desde su caballo ("Mariano Ceballos, AKA "The Indian", kills the bull while riding his horse")

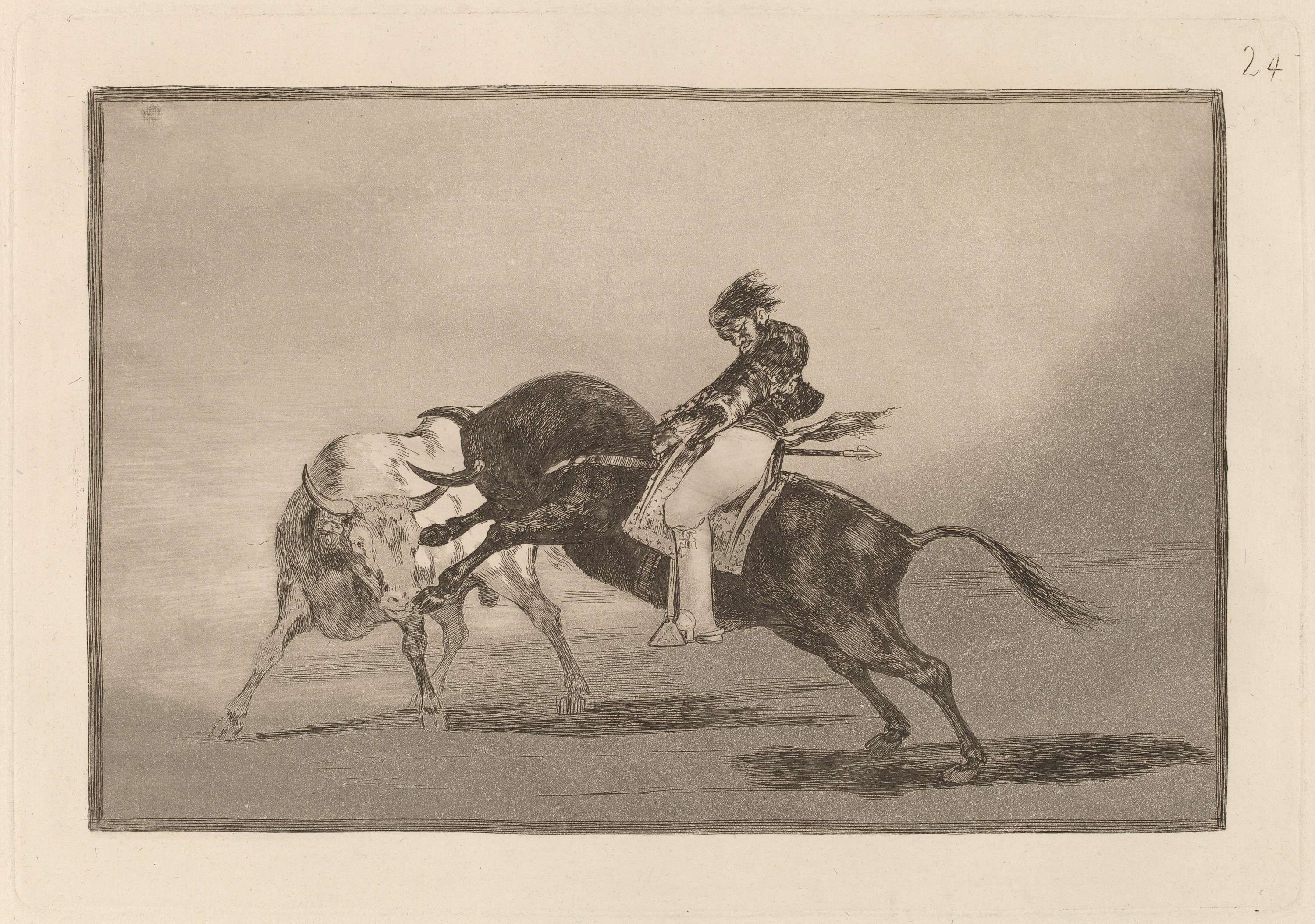
Νο. 24: El mismo Ceballos montado sobre otro toro quiebra rejones en la plaza de Madrid ("The same Ceballos, riding another bull, breaks the "rejones" in Madrid's Plaza")

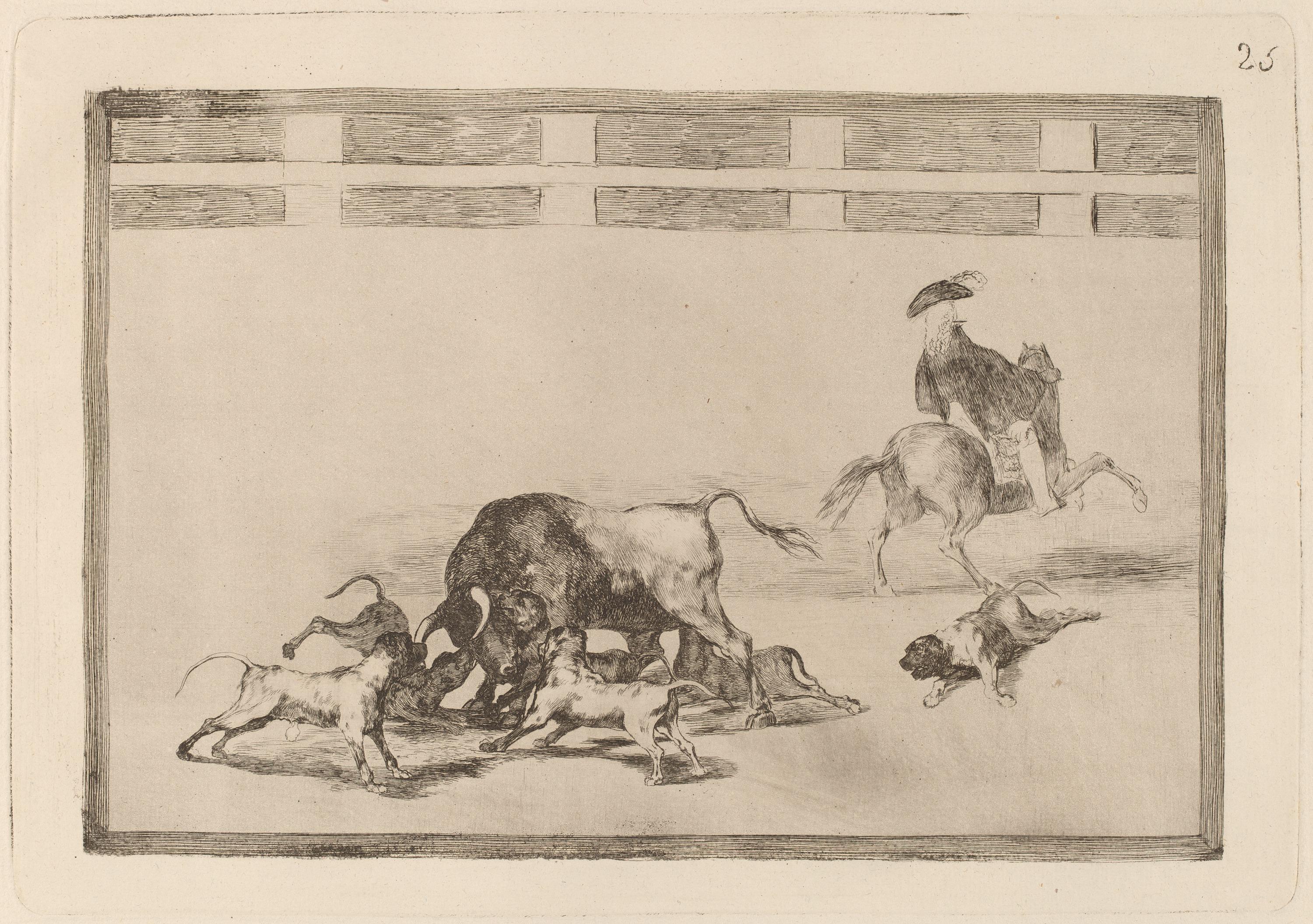
Νο. 25: Echan perros al toro ("Dogs are sicced on the bull")

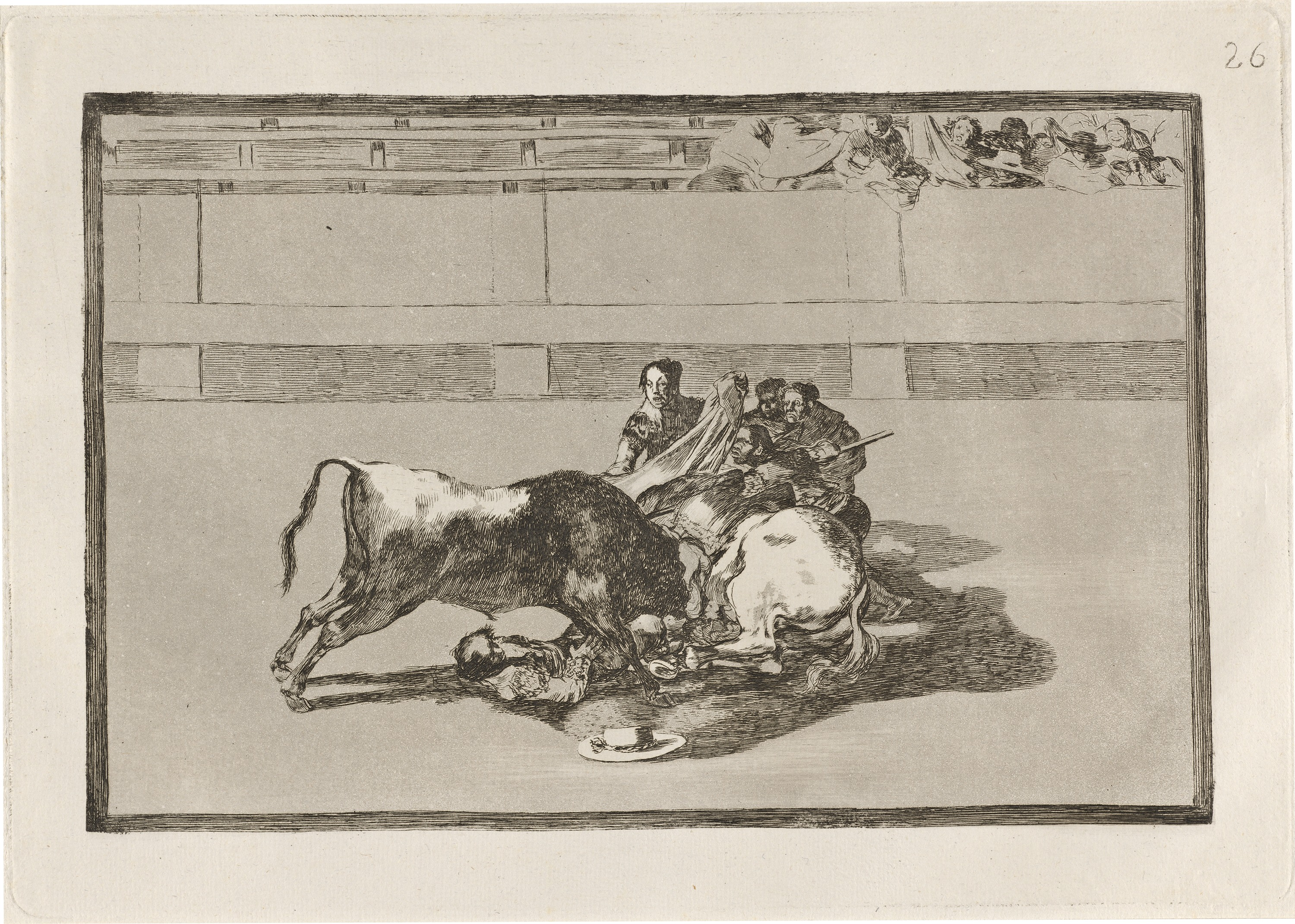
Νο. 26: Caida de un picador de su caballo debajo del toro ("A "picador" falls from his horse, and beneath the bull")

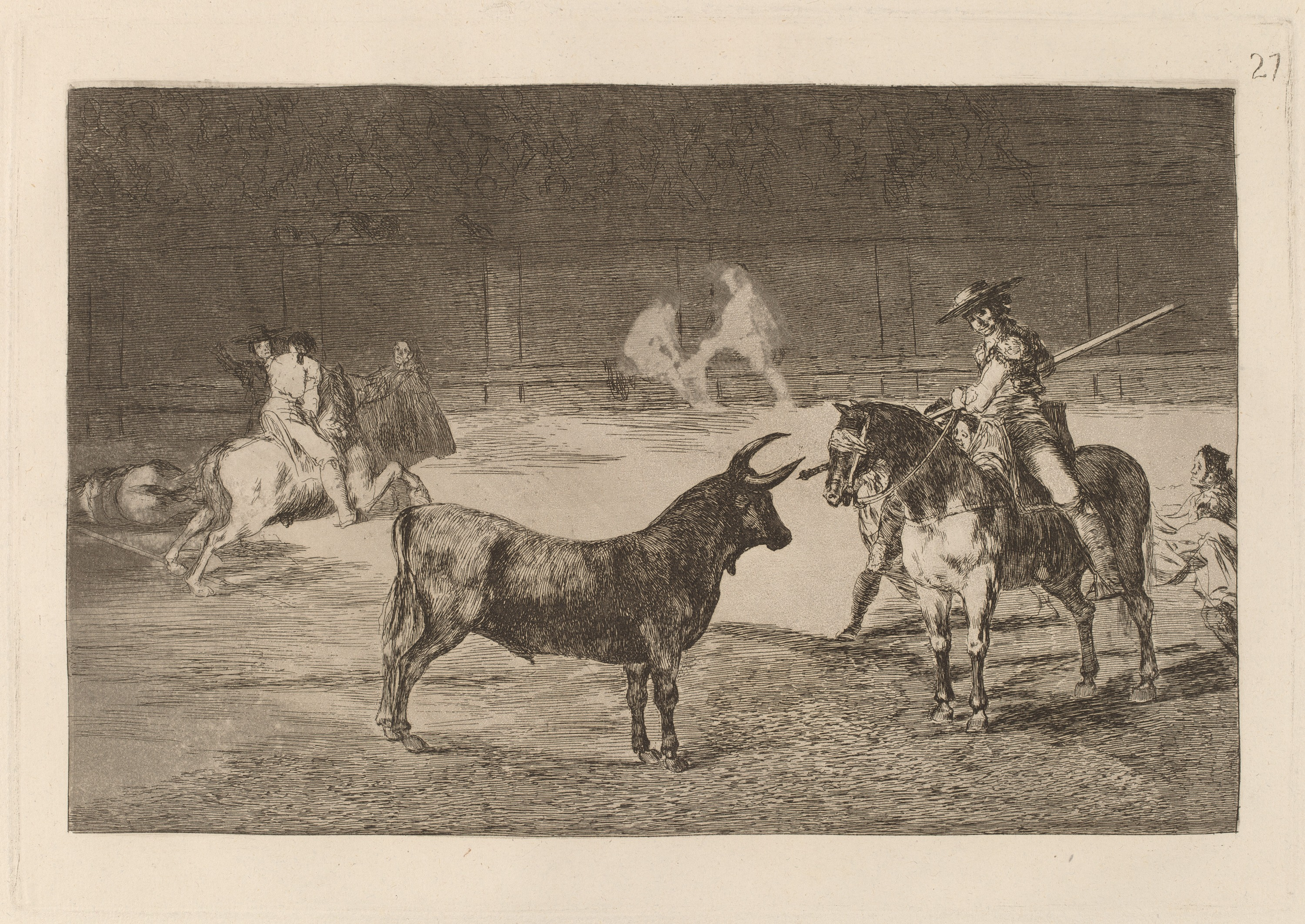
Νο. 27: El celebre Fernando del Toro, barilarguero, obligando a la fiera con su garrocha ("The celebrity Fernando del Toro, "varilarguero", forcing the beast with his "garrocha")

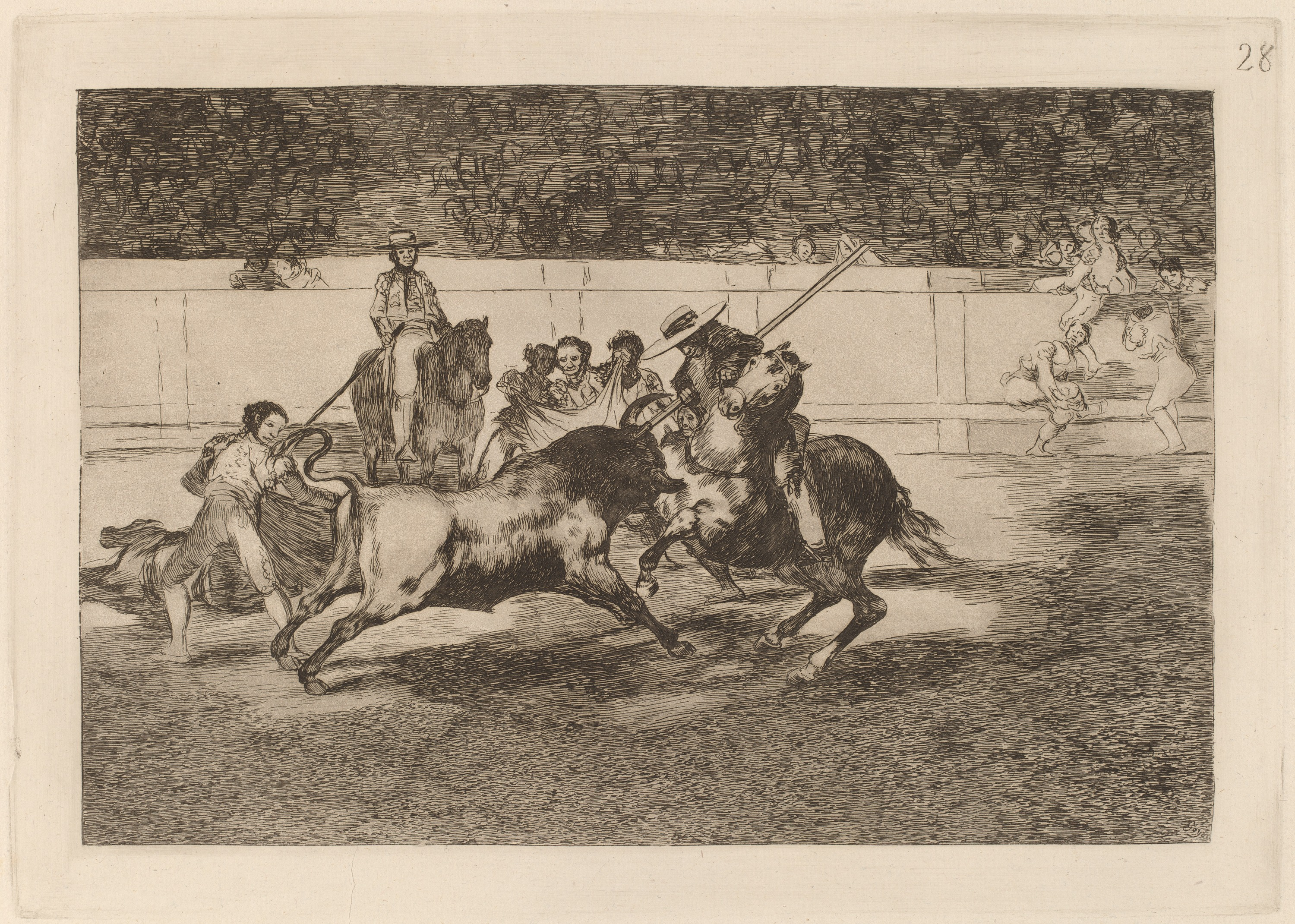
Νο. 28: El esforzado Rendón picando un toro, de cuya suerte murió en plaza de Madrid ("The vigorous Rendón stings a bull, who luckily died in Madrid's plaza")

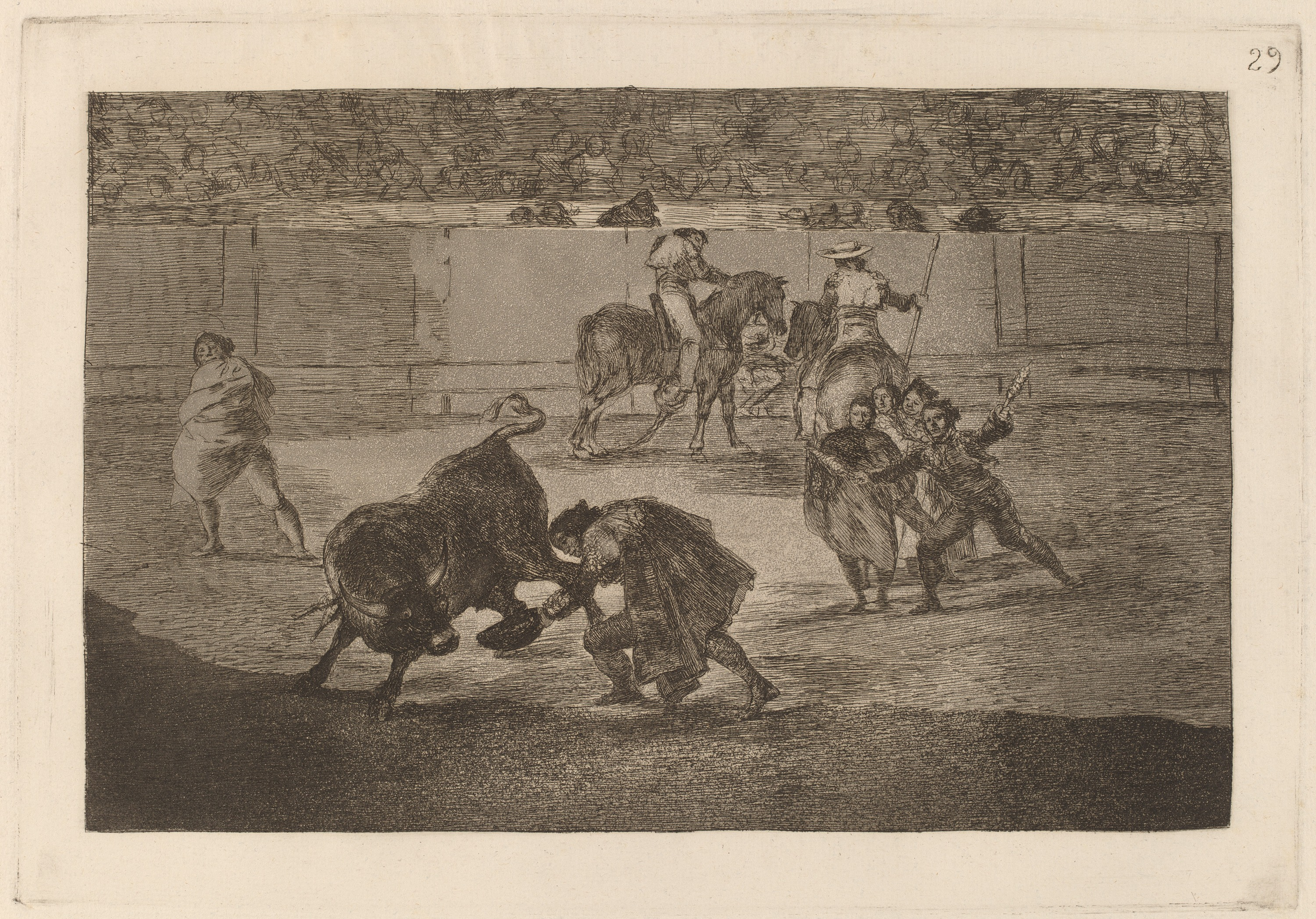
Νο. 29: Pepe Illo haciendo el recorte al toro ("Pepe Illo cuts away at the bull")

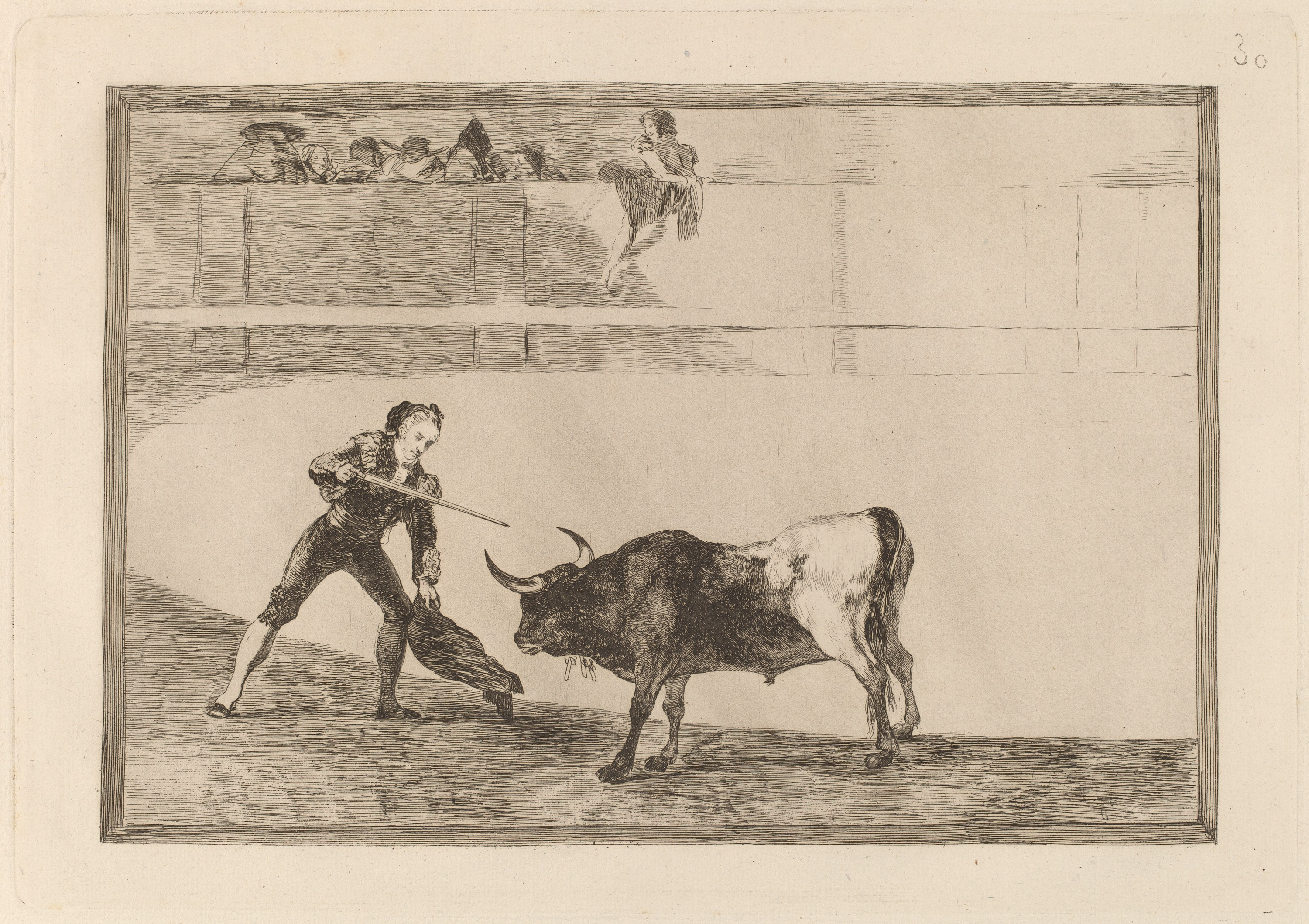
Νο. 30: Pedro Romero matando a toro parado ("Pedro Romero slaying a standing bull")

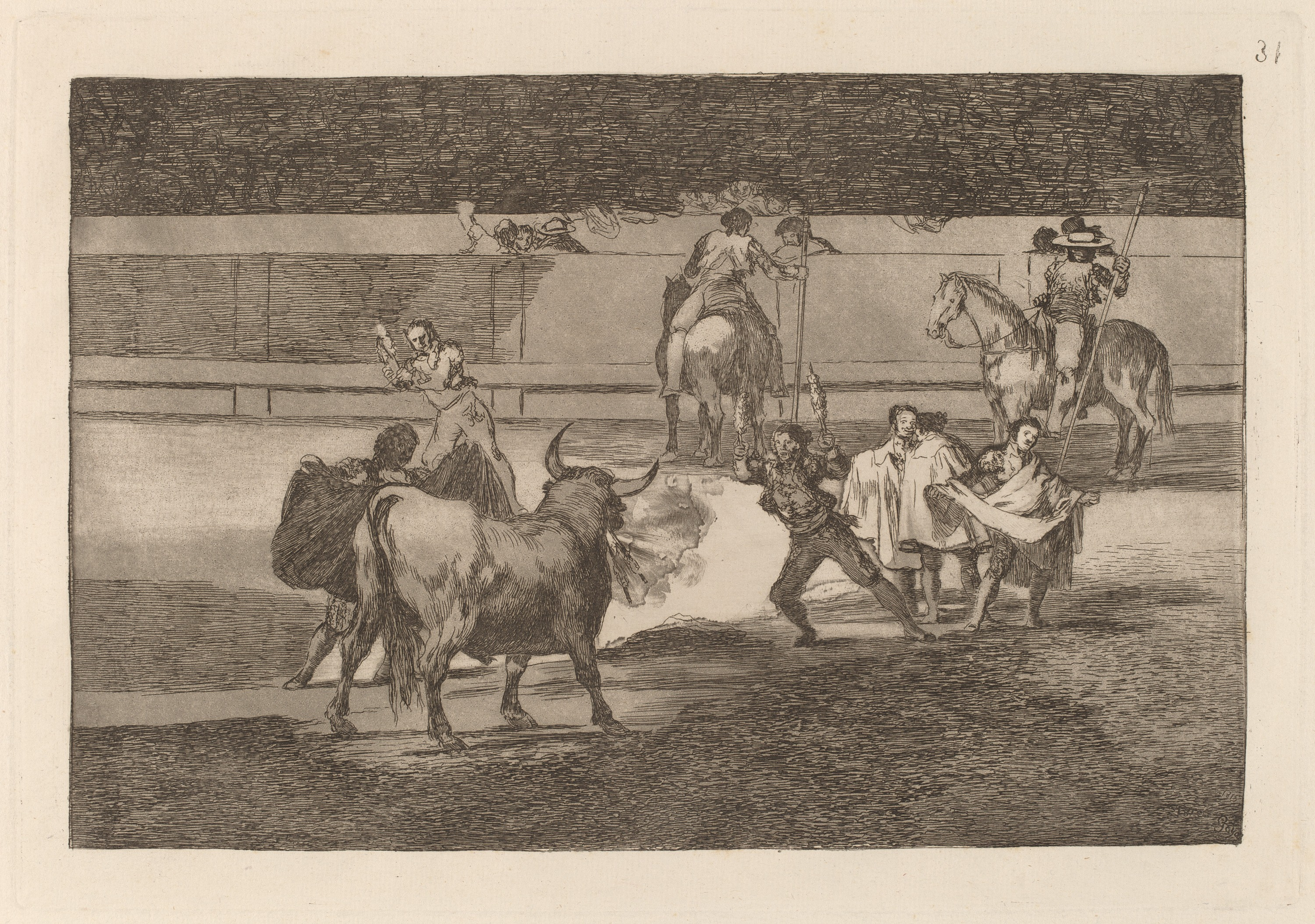
Νο. 31: Banderillas de fuego ("Fiery "banderillas")

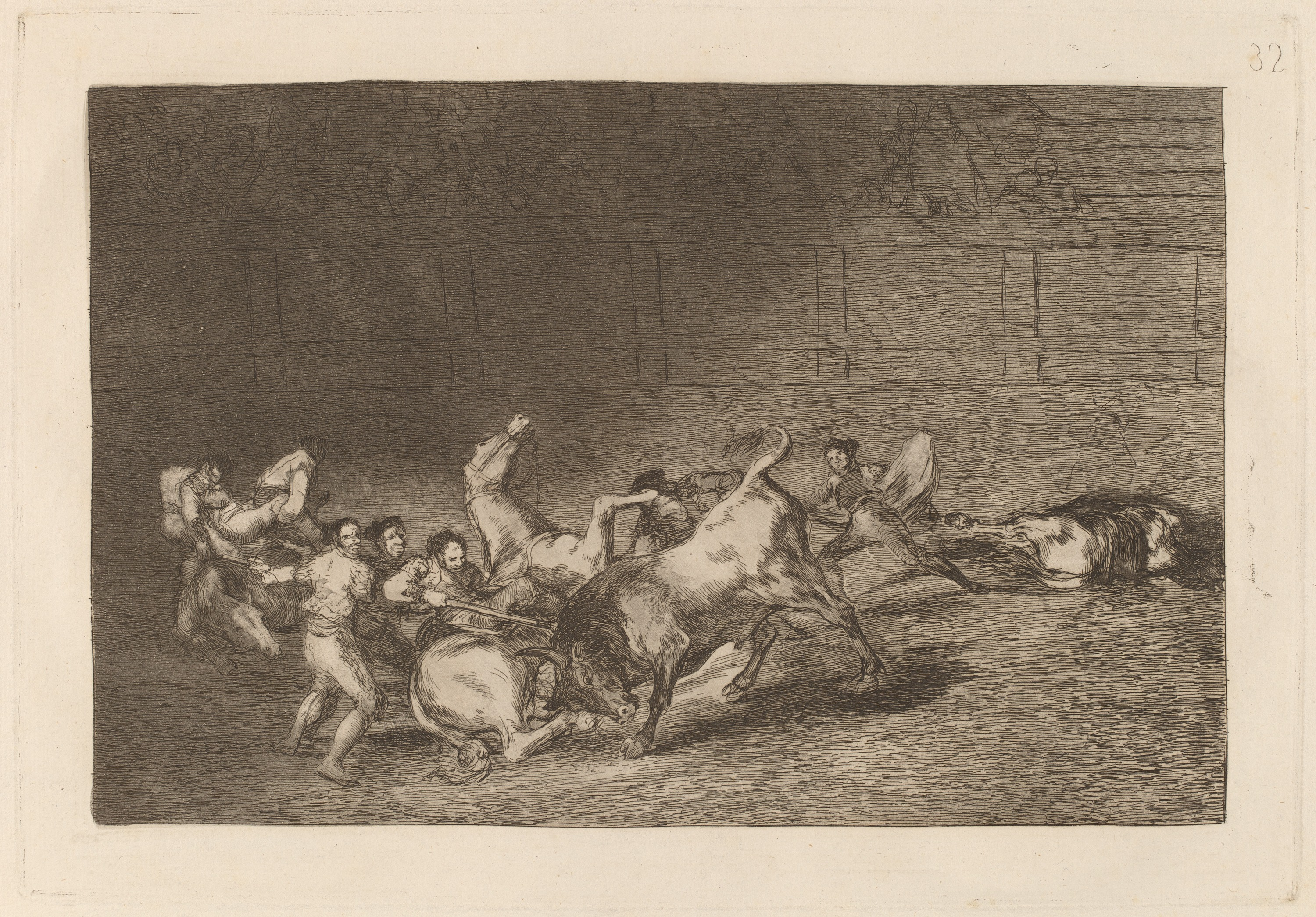
Νο. 32: Dos grupos de picadores arrollados de seguida por un solo toro ("Two groups of "picadores" pinned down by a single bull")

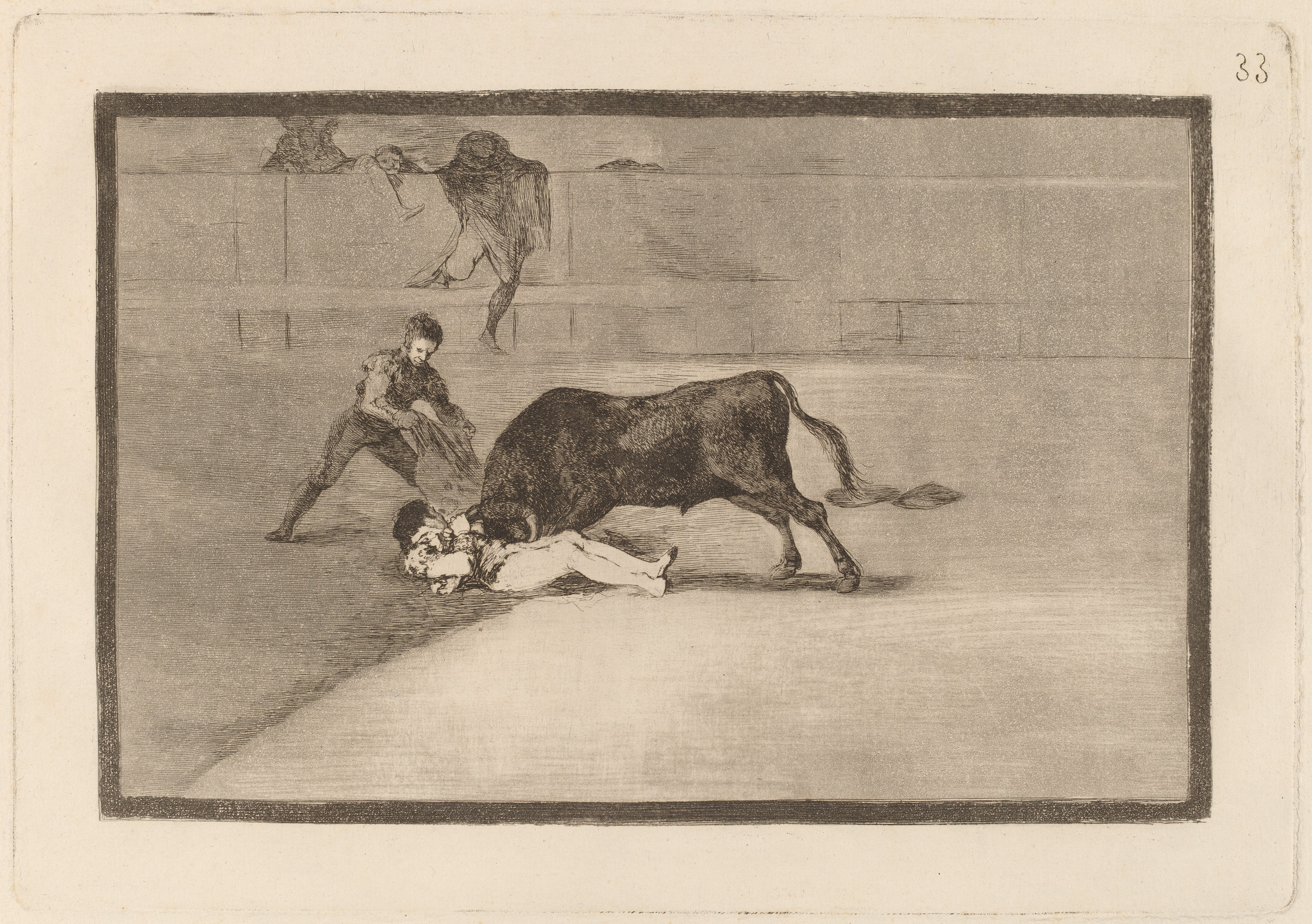
Νο. 33: La desgraciada muerte de Pepe Illo en la plaza de Madrid ("The disgraceful death of Pepe Illo in Madrid's plaza")

=== Unpublished prints ===
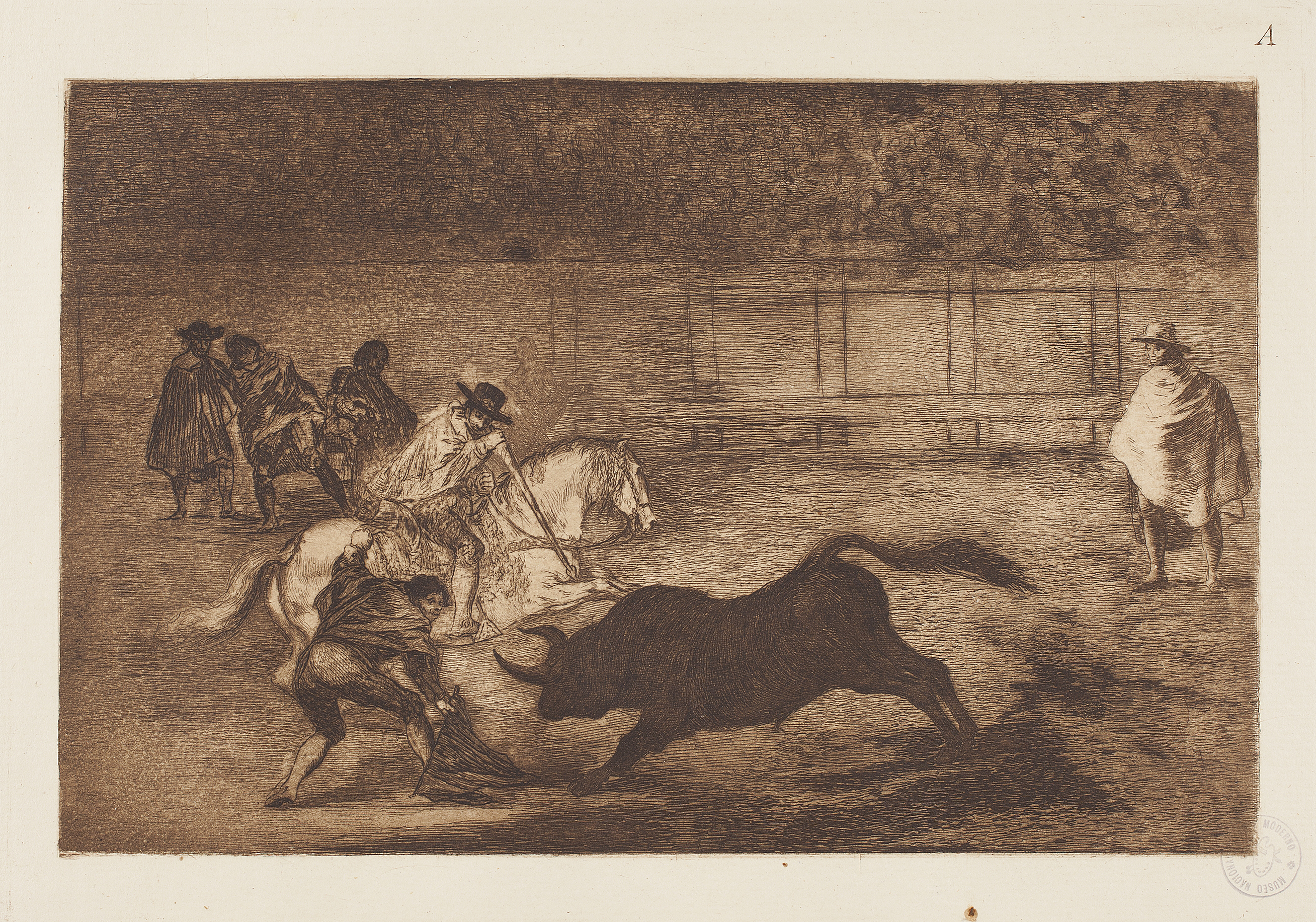
A: Un caballero en plaza quebrando un rejoncillo con ayuda de un chulo

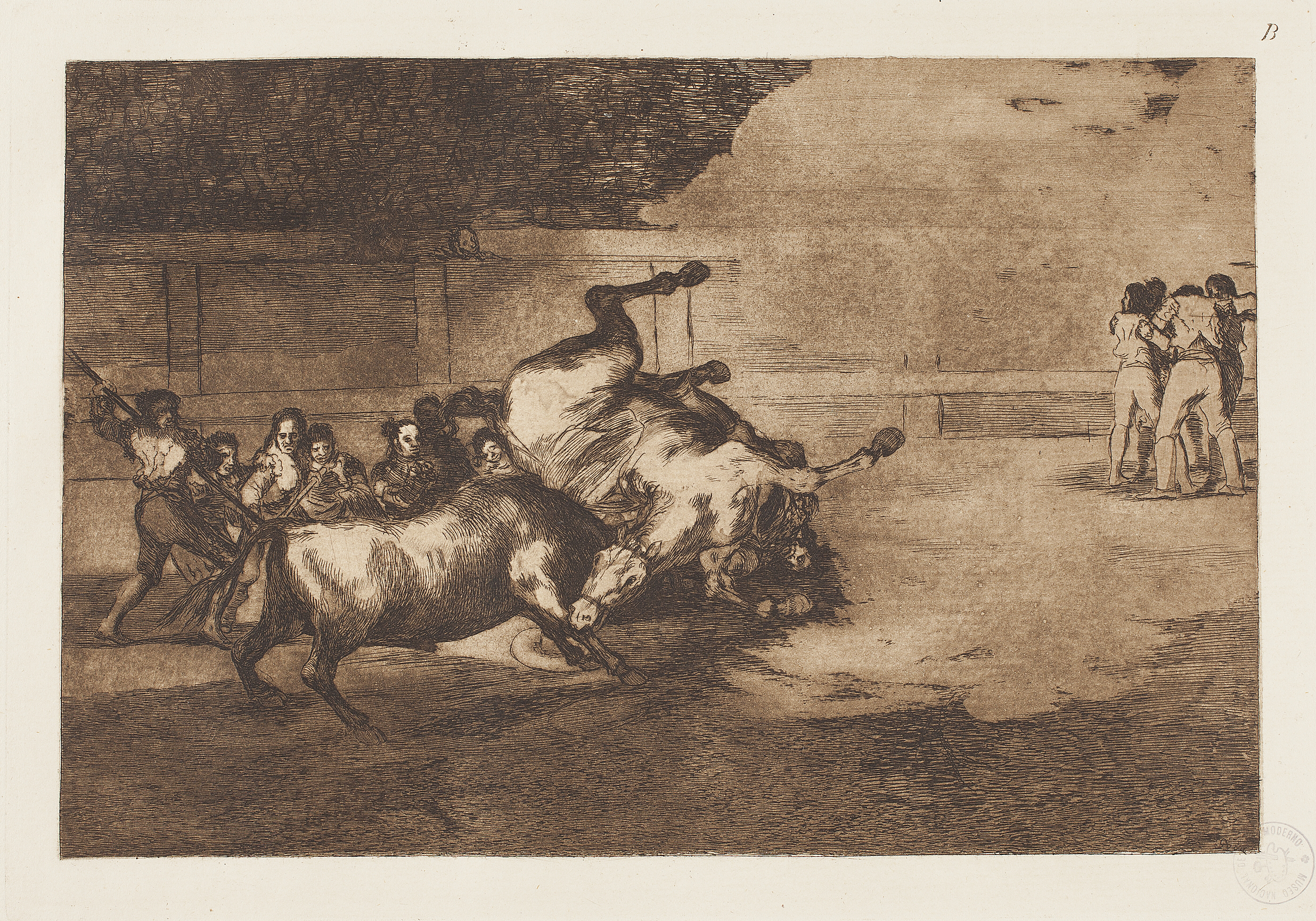
B: Desgraciada embestida de un poderoso toro

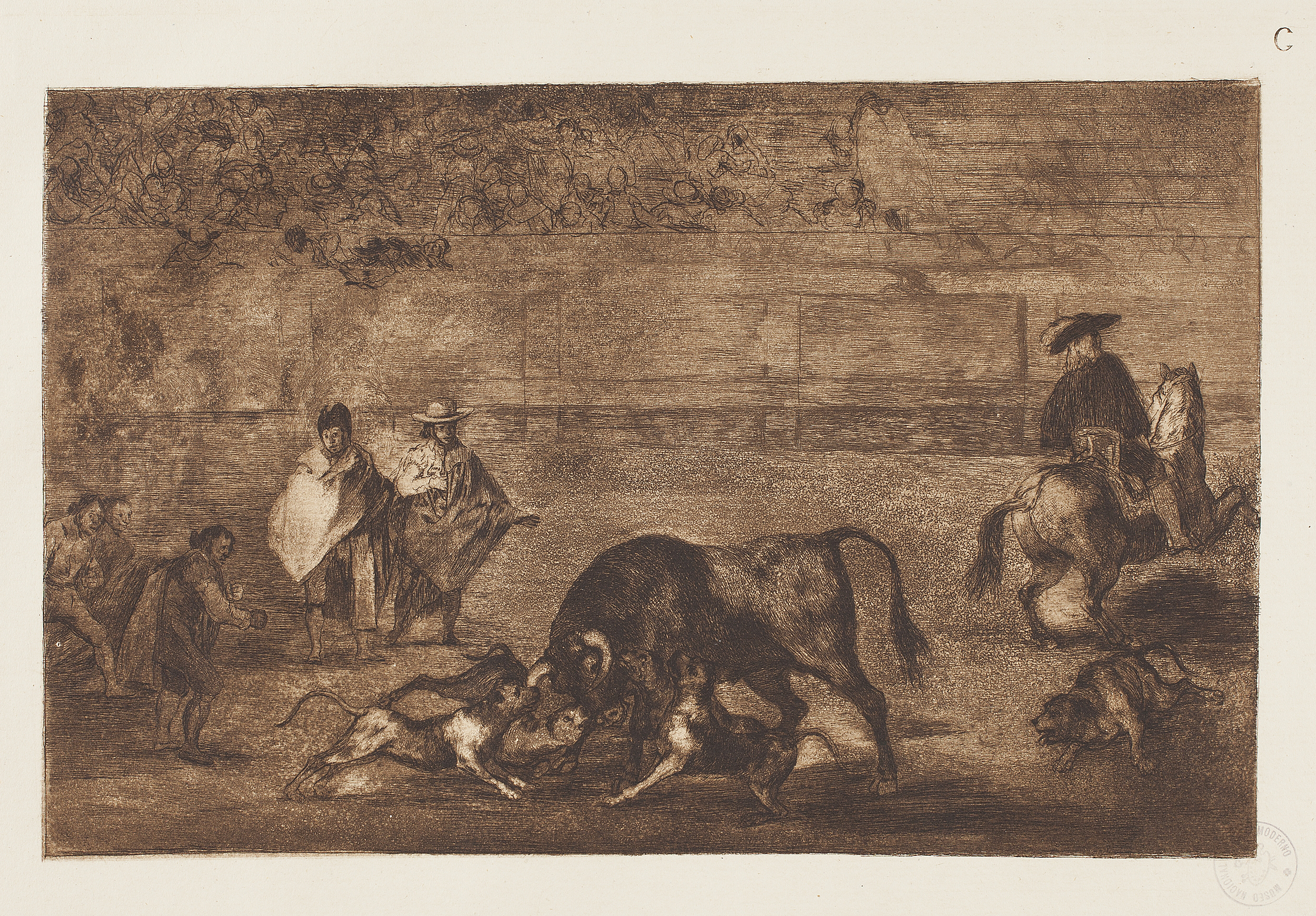
C: Perros al toro

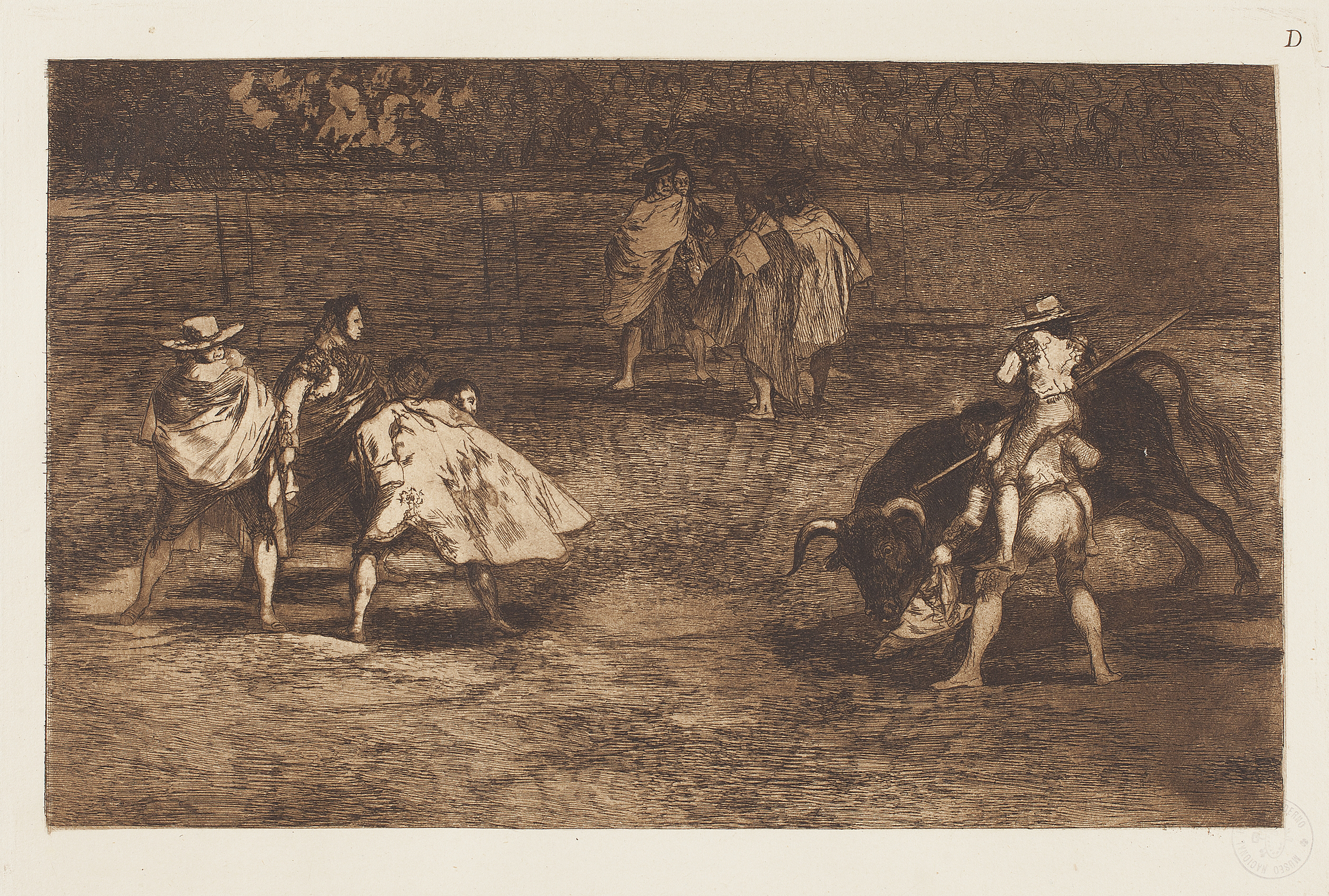
D: Un varilarguero, montado a hombros de un chulo, pica al toro

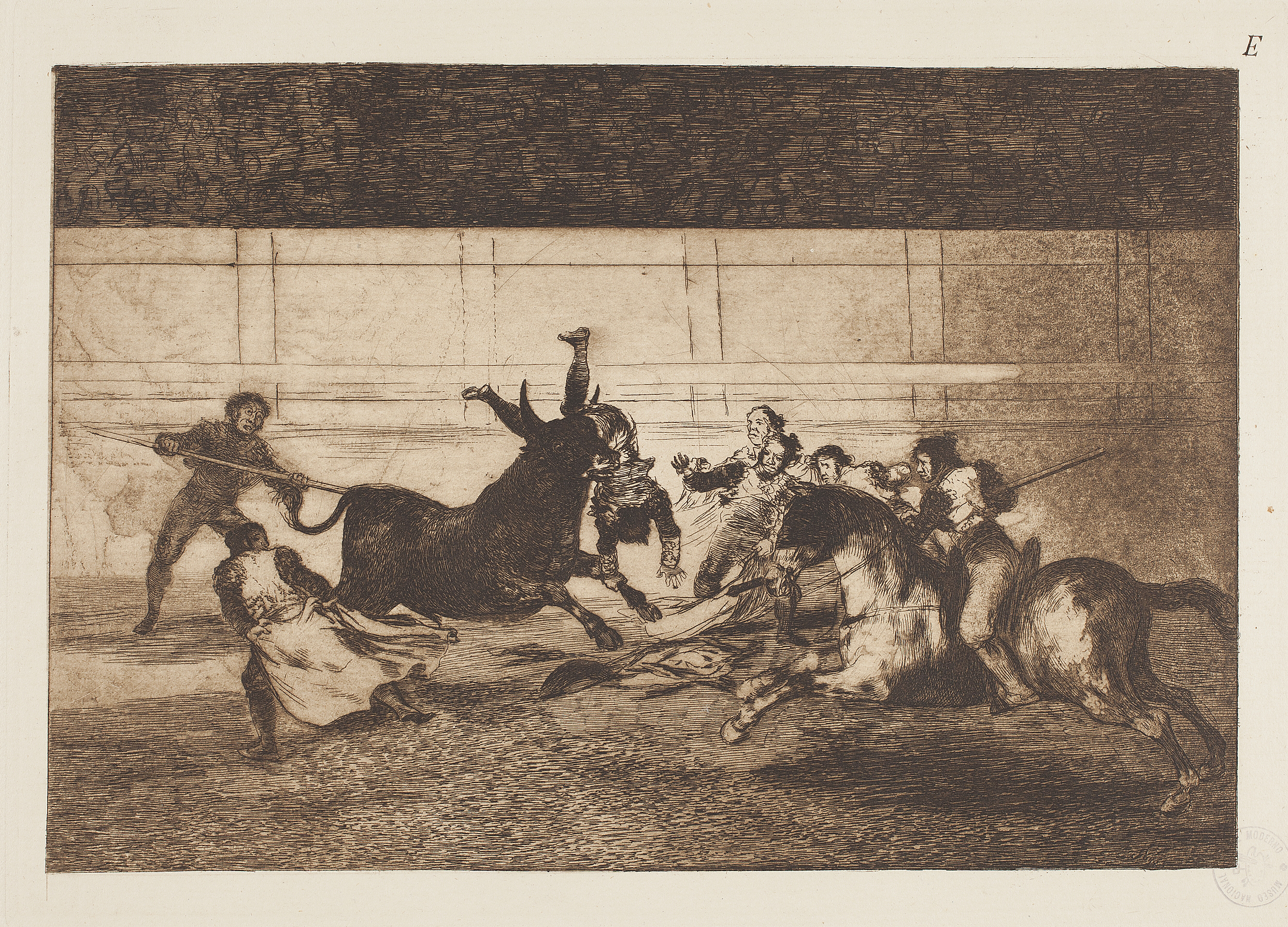
E: Espanto y confusión en la defensa de un chulo cogido

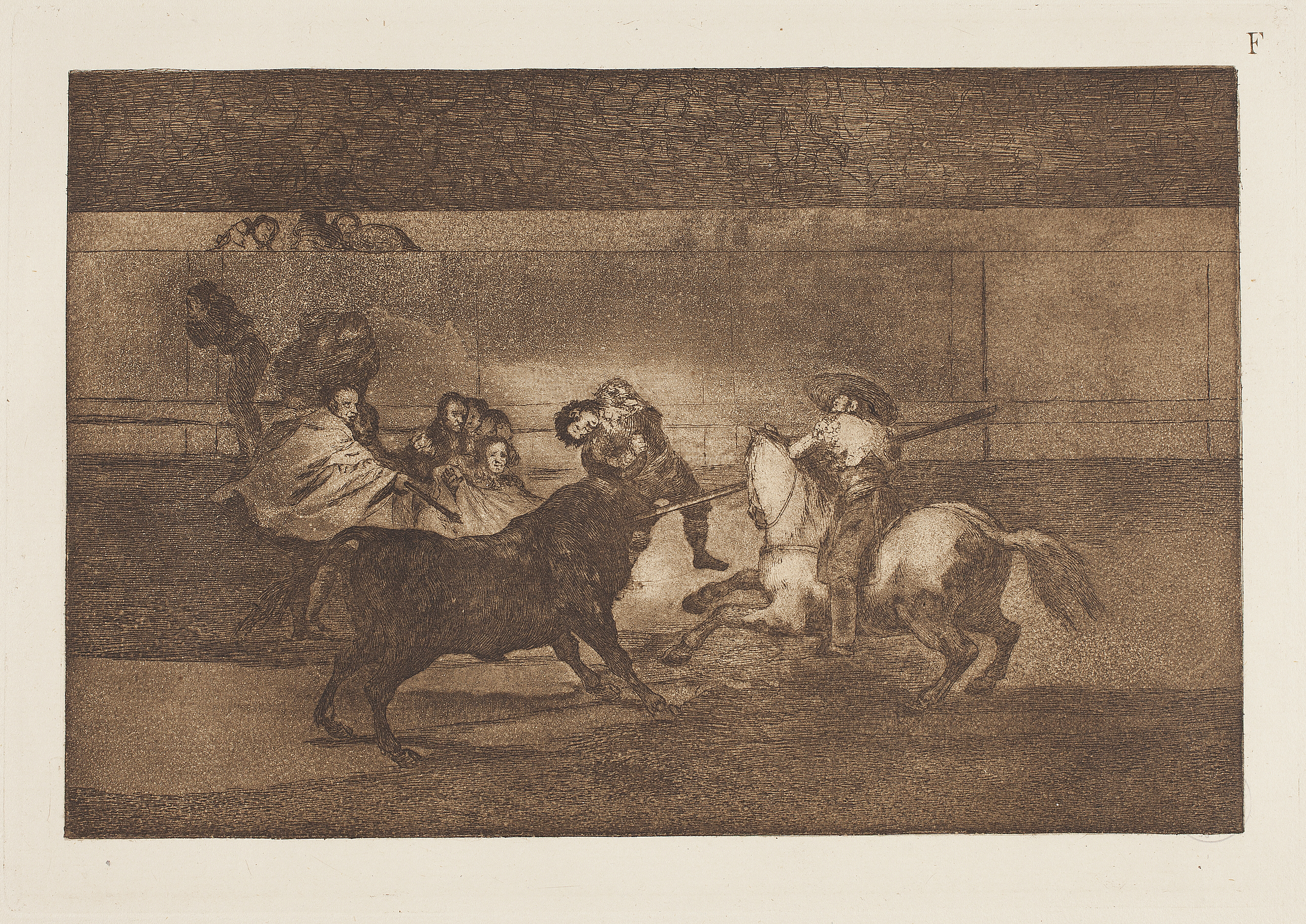
F: Varilarguero y chulos haciendo el quite a un torero cogido

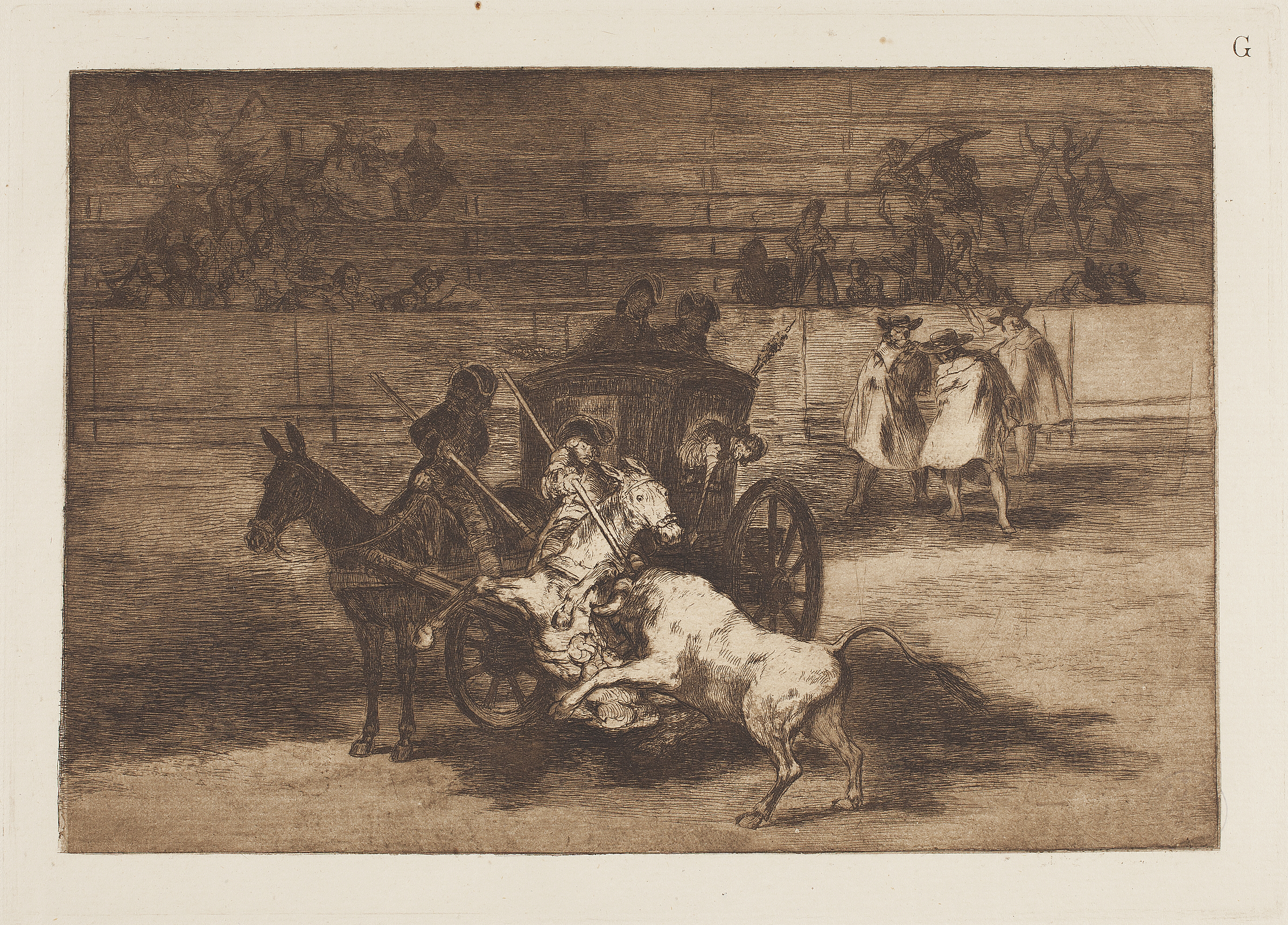
G: Función de mojiganga

== See also ==
- List of works by Francisco Goya
- La novillada
