= A Village Bullfight =

Oil painting by Francisco Goya

- Spanish: Corrida de toros en un pueblo
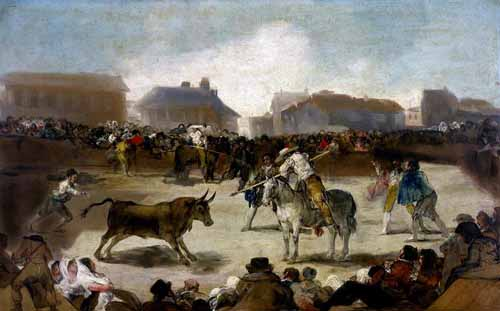
- Artist: Francisco Goya
- Year: 1815–1819
- Medium: oil on a panel
- Movement: genre painting
- Dimensions: 45x72 cm
- Location: Real Academia de Bellas Artes de San Fernando, Madrid

A Village Bullfight or A Village Corrida (Spanish: Corrida de toros en un pueblo) is an oil painting by the Spanish painter Francisco Goya.

The artwork depicts a bullfight scene taking place in a small village. It belongs to a series of four cabinet paintings of similar dimensions, executed in oil paint on tropical wood panels. The series portrays various themes, but their common underlying idea is madness. These paintings were most likely not commissioned but originated from the painter's creativity. The exact date of creation is unknown but is dated to the period after the French occupation. They are part of the collection of the Real Academia de Bellas Artes de San Fernando in Madrid.

== Circumstances of creation ==
The painting belongs to a series of four cabinet works of small dimensions painted on wood panels. The series also includes: A Procession of Flagellants, The Inquisition Tribunal and The Madhouse. Thematically and technically similar is also the painting The Burial of the Sardine, included in this series by some researchers. The works were created as a thematically related cycle of "whims and inventions", the central theme of which is madness. Irrationalism in all its manifestations was a constant theme in Goya's art. It often appears in his drawings, where the artist ironically depicts characters who consider themselves wiser or more civilized than others. Earlier examples of his paintings include Yard with Lunatics (1793–1794) and Plague hospital (1806–1808). Thematically, the paintings are close to Spanish Black Legend. They depict some aspects of life in early 19th-century Spain that Enlightenment supporters and liberals attempted to reform. The fierce criticism of society seems to be an expression of anger and sadness felt after the war and the restoration of absolute monarchy by Ferdinand VII. The pessimistic vision is also marked by the painter's personal crisis associated with the illness and death of his wife, Josefa Bayeu, in 1812. Among these scenes, the bullfight is the least terrifying and the simplest to interpret in terms of both form and content. Goya refers to themes from an earlier series of cabinet paintings painted in 1793, which included eight bullfight scenes.

Goya was a great lover of bullfighting, as evidenced by numerous compositions depicting bullfights executed in various techniques and appearing regularly throughout his career. He also painted portraits of famous bullfighters like Portrait of the Matador Pedro and Portrait of toreador José Romero, and included himself in the design of the tapestry La Novillada, depicting a bullfight with young bulls. Despite this, Goya did not depict bullfighting as a positive pastime; works on this subject contain a clear critique of irrational brutality and cruelty. In Spain, bullfights attracted spectators from all social classes and were known for numerous excesses. Since the time of Philip V, several royal decrees have been issued that, in line with the Enlightenment, prohibited the killing of bulls and even the spectacle itself. Charles IV also reiterated the ban in 1805. Official bans were accepted among the aristocracy but ignored by the people, who continued to massively participate in bullfights held throughout Spain and its colonies.

== Dating ==
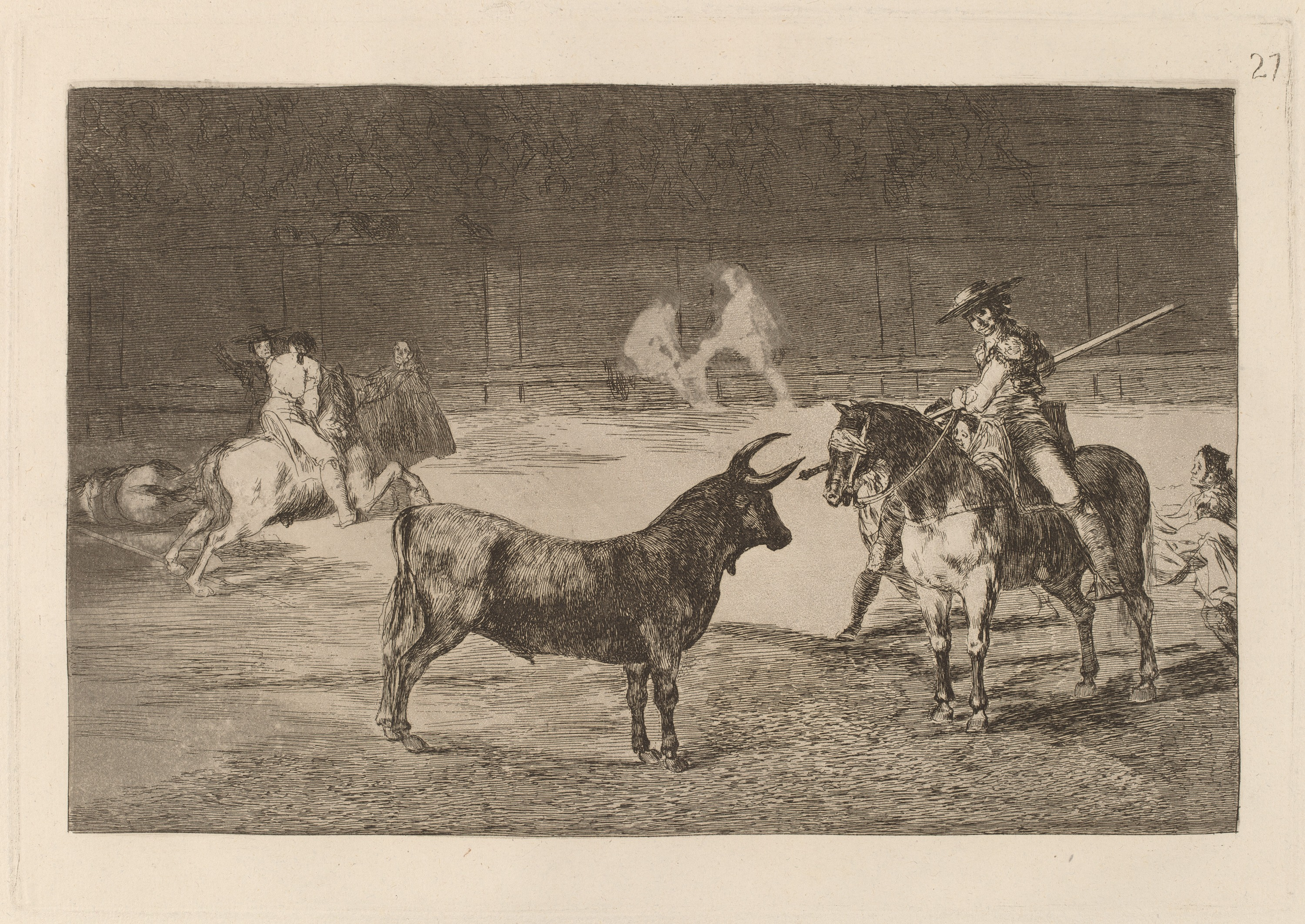
The celebrity Fernando del Toro, "varilarguero", forcing the beast with his "garrocha", La Tauromaquia, drawing 27

There is no precise information about the period in which this series of paintings was created; the first documented mention of them comes from the will of the collector Manuel García de la Prada, drawn up in 1836. The timeframe established based on the style and themes of the works covers the period of the Peninsular War fought from 1808 to 1814 and the subsequent period of intensified repression by King Ferdinand VII lasting until 1820–1821. This was a period of accusations of collaboration, interrogations, and purges at the royal court. The somber atmosphere of these works also suggests that they were painted after King Ferdinand VII regained the throne in 1813. From November 1814 to April 1815, Goya lived in uncertainty as to whether the testimonies of his friends would suffice to clear his name. Ultimately, he faced no consequences for his work as court painter under the rule of Joseph Bonaparte and was cleared of suspicion.

Based on the costumes of the characters, the likely period of creation can be narrowed down to 1814–1816. There are also similarities between these works and drawings from Album C and the later prints from the series The Disasters of War, dated to 1815–1816. A Village Bullfight probably originated around the same time as the series of prints titled La Tauromaquia, made between 1815 and 1816. The painting is closely related to the earliest prints and their preparatory drawings. There is a clear resemblance between the depicted scene and print number 27 titled The celebrity Fernando del Toro, "varilarguero", forcing the beast with his "garrocha".

== Description ==
The scene depicts a popular bullfight organized in a small town. A makeshift fence made of wooden beams surrounds the arena, where numerous spectators have gathered. There is a palpable atmosphere of excitement and anticipation. The painting captures one of the most dramatic moments of the bullfight, as the mounted picadors begin to tease the still strong bull. The picador in the center of the arena prepares to thrust his lance into the clearly tense and alert animal. The sharp end of the lance and the bull's horns are at the center of the scene. Other bullfighters are positioned around, with a second picador barely discernible in the background. A row of houses is visible behind the arena.

The painting features a thoughtful and innovative composition: the subject is approached with the descriptive naturalism of a photographic image. The fight scene in the center of the painting is very clear due to the differentiation of characters by color – the bull, the mounted picador, and the assistants form distinct color spots. Similarly to La Tauromaquia, the surrounding audience is only sketched. The wooden fence separating the spectators from the arena is clearly visible, while the audience and houses further back in the composition are blurred. The viewpoint, located at the height of the grandstand, offers a view of the first row of spectators facing away, the arena, and the distant buildings. It is not precisely known what time of day the bullfight takes place. The way in which the shadow surrounds the arena from both the left and right sides while the center remains brightest is interesting. In this way, the artist focuses the viewer's attention on the confrontation between the bull and the picador, while the audience turns into an anonymous, monochromatic mass.

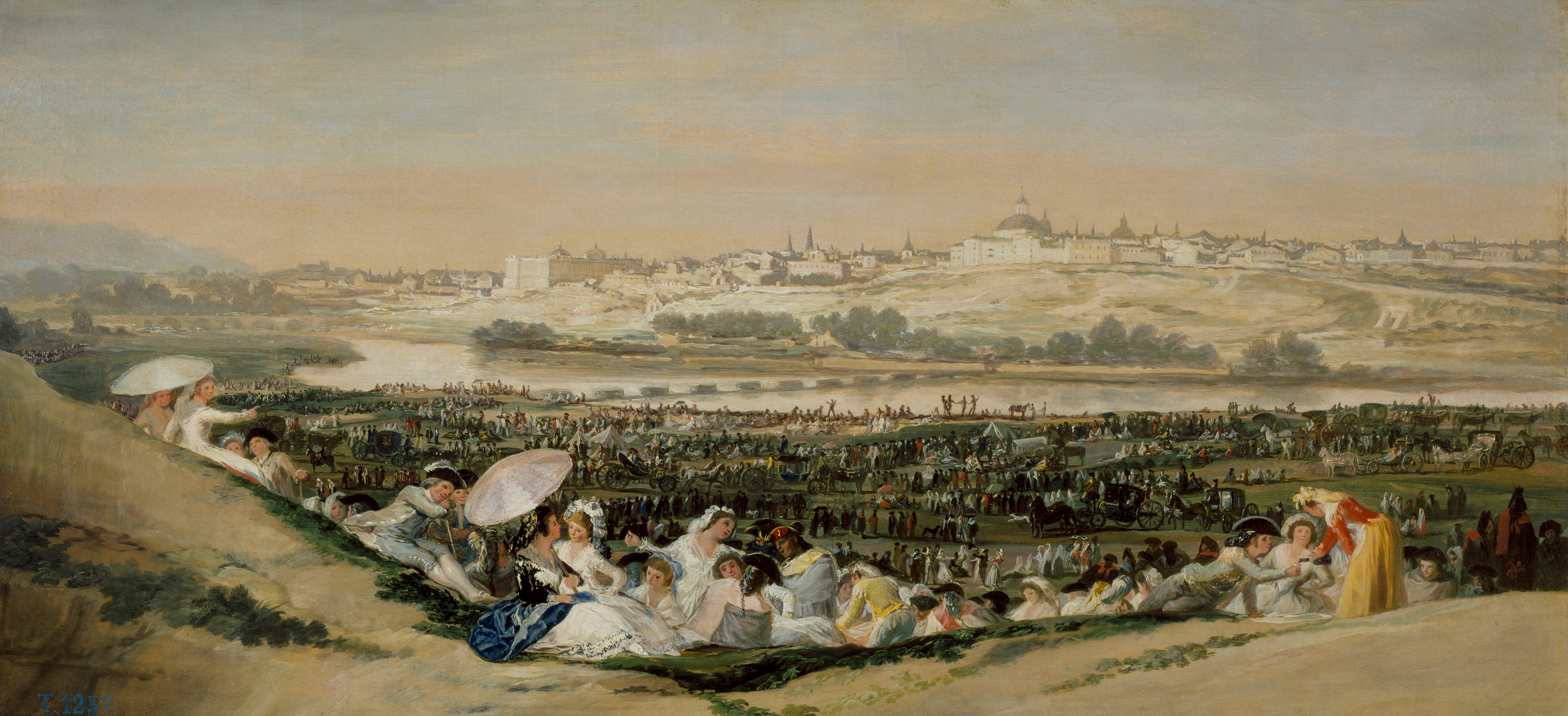
The meadow of San Isidro, 1788, Goya

The spectators in the foreground sit on steps arranged in a semicircle reminiscent of Bullfight in a divided ring, also depicting a bullfight. In both cases, the light comes from the opposite side, resulting in dark silhouettes. A similar arrangement of figures is also visible in The meadow of San Isidro, with buildings in the background. All the figures are individualized, even those seen from behind, such as the broad silhouette of the man in a hat positioned directly under the horse's head, creating the axis of perspective and the central point around which the entire composition revolves. The entire town has come to see the spectacle, and one can identify a mother breastfeeding her child, a couple in love, a Benedictine, men and women in majos and majas costumes, and children. Only on the right side is the row of figures facing away broken by a woman who, with wide-open eyes, gazes at the viewer. Her face reflects the consternation and nightmare of the spectacle in which she is participating. She is the only person aware of the brutality of bullfighting and the pervasive madness engulfing the audience. Goya introduced a similar character in A Procession of Flagellants. The painting, seemingly a genre scene of a local festival, is in reality a new interpretation of madness, which appears to be the theme of this series.

Elías Tormo reviewed a copy from the Baroness de Areyzaga's collection, exhibited in Zaragoza in 1908. Enrique Lafuente Ferrari states that the painter Francisco Lameyer made faithful copies of all four paintings in this series.

== Technique ==
The paintings were executed on wooden panels made of hard tropical mahogany, possibly sourced from colonies such as Cuba. A similar support was used for the sketch of Saints Justa and Rufina from 1817 and The Burial of the Sardine. It is not a refined material; it is possible that Goya used boards from cigar boxes imported from the colonies. Radiography of the paintings reveals that the base was made from two larger and two smaller pieces of wood perfectly joined to achieve the desired dimensions. The use of such a support may also indicate the post-war period when there was a shortage of materials for painting, and Goya had a habit of reusing canvases and painting over finished works. All the paintings were covered with the same beige-orange underpainting, which smoothed the porous surface of the wood. The underpainting covering the entire surface of the panel of A Village Bullfight remains visible in many places within the composition and at the edges of the board.

The freedom of technique is a distinguishing feature of this painting. Goya applied diluted paint with a brush in a technique similar to gouache, achieving thin and transparent layers of color. In other areas, he used quick, expressive brushstrokes with a large amount of paint. The composition is almost monochromatic; both the audience and bullfighters are outlined in black paint and animated with eye-catching color accents or small white brushstrokes. Goya used diluted carmine and blue for two spectators on the right. The background figures are painted in an almost abstract manner, yet the sparse brushstrokes are precise, giving even the distant figures individual character, such as the man leaning out from behind the railing on the right, provoking the bull by waving a hat or scarf. The row of houses in the background was created with light brushstrokes in shades of gray, creating a blurred effect in the air.

== Provenance ==
The owner of the series was the wealthy banker and collector Manuel García de la Prada, a friend of Goya, who was portrayed by the painter around 1805–1808. However, it is not known when or under what circumstances he acquired the paintings. García de la Prada emigrated from Spain in 1812 and returned in 1821. If the paintings were created earlier, during the war period, he could have bought them directly from the painter in Madrid. Otherwise, he may have acquired them after his return to the country during the Trienio Liberal (1820–1823) or shortly before Goya's emigration to France in 1824. He could also have purchased them only after Goya's death from his son, Javier. An inventory of Goya's works made after his death in 1828 lists "four small paintings depicting saints and customs", which probably refers to this cycle. Assuming this identification is correct, the series was not sold during the painter's lifetime; it is not known whether he decided to keep it for himself or did not find a buyer. The paintings were certainly part of García de la Prada's collection in 1836 when he mentioned them in his will, bequeathing them to the Academy of San Fernando, along with The Burial of the Sardine. In his will, García de la Prada mentioned that these paintings were "highly valued by the professors [of the academy]". Since Goya was a member of it and often exhibited his paintings there, perhaps these were also known to the Madrid institution. However, according to Manuela Mena, the subjects of these paintings and the criticism contained in them were too closely associated with the conservative government for Goya to present them at the academy or sell them before the Trienio Liberal. All the paintings were included in the academy's collection in December 1839, after the owner's death.

The painting was chosen for the illustrated collection of the most important works of the Real Academia de Bellas Artes de San Fernando published in 1885. For this purpose, the painter José María Galván made a drawing and engraving based on the painting.

== Bibliography ==
- Yriarte, Charles (1867). Goya. Paris: Henri Plon. p. 131.
- Sánchez, Ceferino Araujo (1896). Goya y su época. Madrid: La España Moderna. p. catalogue 88.
- von Loga, Valerian (1903). Francisco de Goya. Mümchen: Klinkhardt & Biermann. p. catalogue 537.
- de Beruete, Aureliano (1917). Goya. Composiciones y figuras. Vol. II. Madrid: Blas y Cia. p. catalogue 147.
- Mayer, August L. (1925). Francisco Goya. Barcelona: Labor. p. 650.
- y Manzano, Cipriano Muñoz; de la Viñaza, Conde (2011) [1887]. Goya. Su tiempo, su vida, sus obras. Madrid: Topografía de Manuel G. Hernández (Facsimile Fundación Goya en Aragón y Gobierno de Aragón). p. 284. ISBN 9788483802533.
- Fitz-Gérald, Xavier Desparmet (1928–1950). L'oeuvre peint de Goya. Vol. II. Paris: F. de Nobele. p. catalogue 212.
- Gassier, Pierre; Bareau, Juliet Wilson (1974). Vida y obra de Francisco Goya: reproducción de su obra completa, pinturas, dibujos y grabados. Barcelona: Juventud. p. 319 (catalogue 465). ISBN 8426156827.
- de Angelis, Rita (1974). L'opera pittorica completa di Goya. Milan. p. 127 (catalogue 559).
- Gassier, Pierre, ed. (1990). Goya, toros y toreros: Real Academia de Bellas Artes de San Fernando. Madrid: Instituto del Patrimonio Histórico Español. p. catalogue 13. ISBN 8474836336.
- Glendinning, Nigel; Segovia, Eduardo; Zaragoza, Teresa; Medina, Alicia Garcí; Vega, Jesusa (2002). Goya 1900: catálogo ilustrado y estudio de la exposición en el Ministerio de Instrucción Pública y Bellas Artes. Vol. II. Madrid: Ministerio de Cultura. p. 39 (catalogue 14). ISBN 8436935527.
- Hofmann, Werner (2003). Goya: "To every story there belongs another". London: Thames & Hudson. p. 198. ISBN 0500093172.
