= The Burial of the Sardine =

Painting by Francisco de Goya

- El entierro de la sardina (Spanish)
- Artist: Francisco Goya
- Year: c. 1812–1819
- Medium: Oil on wood
- Dimensions: 82.5 cm × 62 cm (32.5 in × 24 in)
- Location: Real Academia de Bellas Artes de San Fernando; Madrid

The Burial of the Sardine (Spanish: El entierro de la sardina) is an oil-on-panel painting by Spanish artist Francisco Goya, usually dated to the 1810s. It is held at the Real Academia de Bellas Artes de San Fernando, in Madrid.

== History and description ==
The title is posthumous, referring to the culminating event, Entierro de la Sardina, of a three-day carnival in Madrid ending on Ash Wednesday. Masked and disguised revellers are seen dancing their way to the banks of the Manzanares, where a ceremonial sardine will be buried. Goya does not illustrate the fish in the painting, nor the large doll made of straw, called a pelele, from which it hung; the centrepiece is the darkly grinning "King of the Carnival".

The painting has been dated between 1793 and 1819, but most accounts place it toward the end of this range on account of the painting's style and its place within the shifting themes of Goya's art as he aged. The Burial appears to fit within a progression beginning with the artist's bright, youthful works—in which he painted commissions of popular entertainments and colourful cartoon tapestries—and his much later, psychologically darker Black Paintings. The painting is certainly a tribute to the common people, depicting an exuberant crowd carousing on the first day of Lent while other Spanish Catholics worship at church. Yet the celebration takes on a sinister aspect due to the many masked and blank faces (see the detail in "Gallery") surrounding the gaily dancing women in white; the grey, distorted trees and encroaching dark colours; and the eye-catching black banner that parades an unsettling mascot. Such festivals as the "Burial of the Sardine" originated with themes of mortality: masks were worn to ward off the spirits of criminals and those who had died violently. The word "mortus" ("death") is barely visible on the banner though in a preparatory ink sketch by Goya (in the gallery below) it features prominently over an indistinct shape which may be a representation of the sardine itself. The painting forms a loose thematic set with other paintings of religious ceremony that Goya produced around the same time, among which are A Procession of Flagellants (Procesión de disciplinantes) and Inquisition Scene (Auto de fe de la Inquisición).

Goya scholar Fred Licht writes:

[The Burial of the Sardine] is also one of the most astonishing virtuoso performances to come down to us from Goya's brush. Rarely did Goya again reach such decisiveness of touch. Every brushstroke is a calligraphic marvel at the same time that it describes with consummate precision the expression of faces and the emotional charge of each stance or gesture. We have arrived here at the perfect balancing point between the early tapestry cartoons and the later Black Paintings. All the riotous gaiety of the former appeals to the eye from the surface of the painting. But in the darkening of the colors, in the masklike ambiguity of the faces... and especially in the overwrought gestures and expressions, one begins to feel the obscurely disturbing undertones of mass hysteria underlying the fiesta.

== Gallery ==
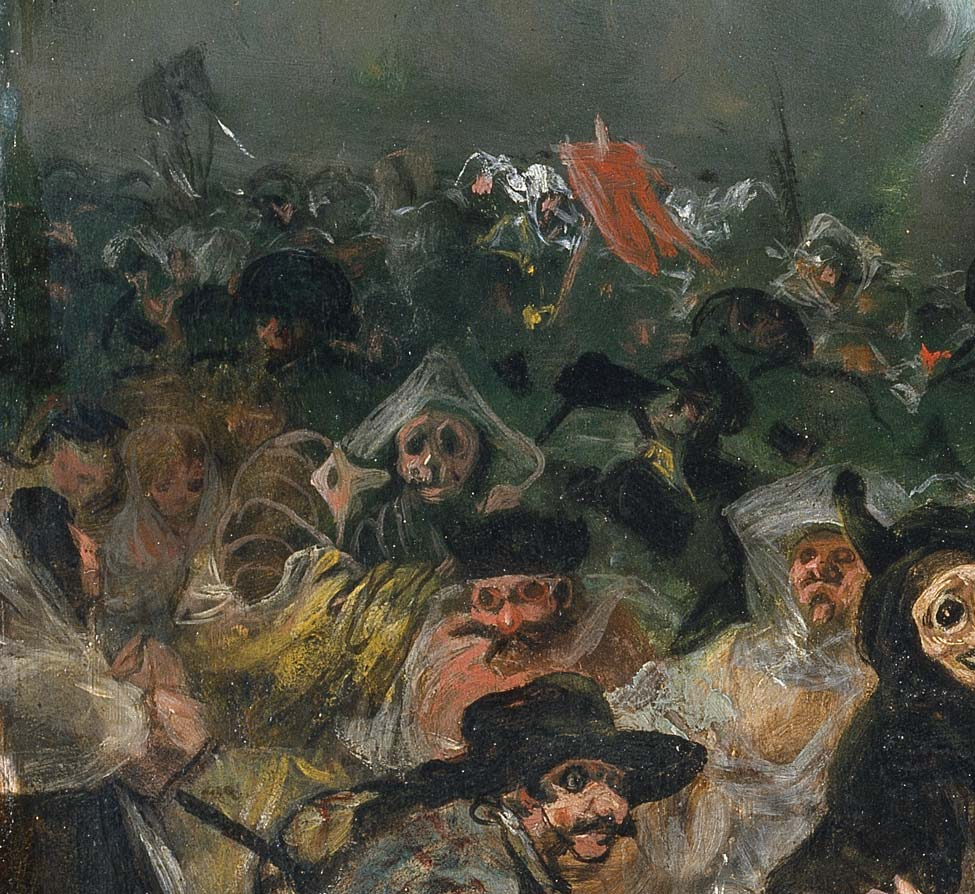
Detail

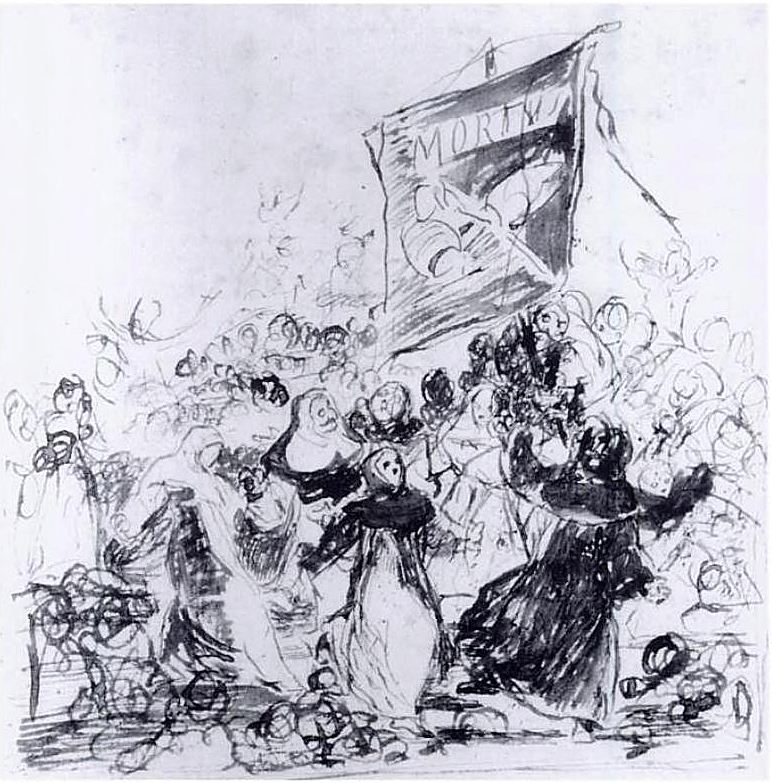
Sketch by Goya in sepia

== See also ==
- List of Francisco Goya's tapestry cartoons
- List of works by Francisco Goya
