= Sardines as food =

Sardines (also known as pilchards) are a nutrient-rich, small, oily fish widely consumed by humans and as forage fish by larger fish species, seabirds and marine mammals. Sardines are a source of omega-3 fatty acids. Sardines can be canned, pickled, smoked, or eaten fresh.

The term sardine was first used in English during the early 15th century, and may come from the Mediterranean island of Sardinia, around which sardines were once abundant.

The terms sardine and pilchard are not precise, and what is meant depends on the region. The United Kingdom's Sea Fish Industry Authority, for example, classifies sardines as young pilchards. One criterion suggests fish shorter in length than 6 inches (15 cm) are sardines, and larger ones pilchards. The FAO/WHO Codex standard for canned sardines cites 12 species in the order of Clupeiformes that may be classed as sardines, including Atlantic herring (Clupea harengus), and brisling sardine (Sprattus sprattus); FishBase, a comprehensive database of information about fish, calls at least six species just 'pilchard', over a dozen just 'sardine', and many more with both those two basic names qualified by various adjectives.

Sardines are commercially fished for a variety of uses: bait, immediate consumption, canning, drying, salting, smoking, and reduction into fish meal or fish oil. The chief use of sardines is for human consumption. Fish meal is used as animal feed, while sardine oil has many uses, including the manufacture of paint, varnish, and linoleum.

== Nutrition ==
Pacific sardines canned, drained solids with bone
Nutritional value per 100 g (3.5 oz)
- Energy: 185 kcal (770 kJ)
- Carbohydrates: 0.54 g
- Sugars: 0.43 g
- Dietary fiber: 0.1 g
- Fat: 10.45 g
- Saturated: 2.684 g
- Monounsaturated: 4.818 g
- Polyunsaturated omega−3 omega−6: 2.111 g 1.457 g 0.655 g
- Protein: 20.86 g
Vitamins and minerals
| Vitamins | Quantity %DV^{†} |
| Vitamin A equiv. | 4% 34 μg |
| Thiamine (B1) | 4% 0.044 mg |
| Riboflavin (B2) | 18% 0.233 mg |
| Niacin (B3) | 26% 4.2 mg |
| Pantothenic acid (B5) | 15% 0.73 mg |
| Vitamin B6 | 7% 0.123 mg |
| Folate (B9) | 6% 24 μg |
| Vitamin B12 | 375% 9 μg |
| Choline | 14% 76 mg |
| Vitamin C | 1% 1 mg |
| Vitamin D | 24% 4.8 μg |
| Vitamin E | 9% 1.38 mg |
| Vitamin K | 0% 0.4 μg |
| Minerals | Quantity %DV^{†} |
| Calcium | 18% 240 mg |
| Copper | 30% 0.272 mg |
| Iron | 13% 2.3 mg |
| Magnesium | 8% 34 mg |
| Manganese | 9% 0.206 mg |
| Phosphorus | 29% 366 mg |
| Potassium | 11% 341 mg |
| Selenium | 74% 40.6 μg |
| Sodium | 18% 414 mg |
| Zinc | 13% 1.4 mg |
- Other constituents: Quantity
- Water: 66.86 g
- Cholesterol: 61 mg
- USDA database entry
- ^{†}Percentages estimated using US recommendations for adults, except for potassium, which is estimated based on expert recommendation from the National Academies.

Sardines are rich in vitamins and minerals. A small serving of sardines once a day can provide up to 13% of the RDA (recommended daily allowance) value of vitamin B_{2}, roughly one-quarter of the RDA of niacin, and about 150% of the RDA of vitamin B_{12}. All B vitamins help to support proper nervous system function and are used for energy metabolism, or converting food into energy. Also, sardines are high in the major minerals such as phosphorus, calcium, potassium, and some trace minerals such as iron and selenium. Sardines are also a natural source of marine omega-3 fatty acids, which reduce the occurrence of cardiovascular disease. Recent studies suggest the regular consumption of omega-3 fatty acids reduces the likelihood of developing Alzheimer's disease and can even boost brain function. These fatty acids may also help lower blood sugar levels a small amount. They are also a good source of vitamin D, calcium, and protein.

Because they are low in the food chain, sardines are very low in contaminants, such as mercury, relative to other fish commonly eaten by humans.

== Canned sardines ==
Typical can of sardines, in salt water

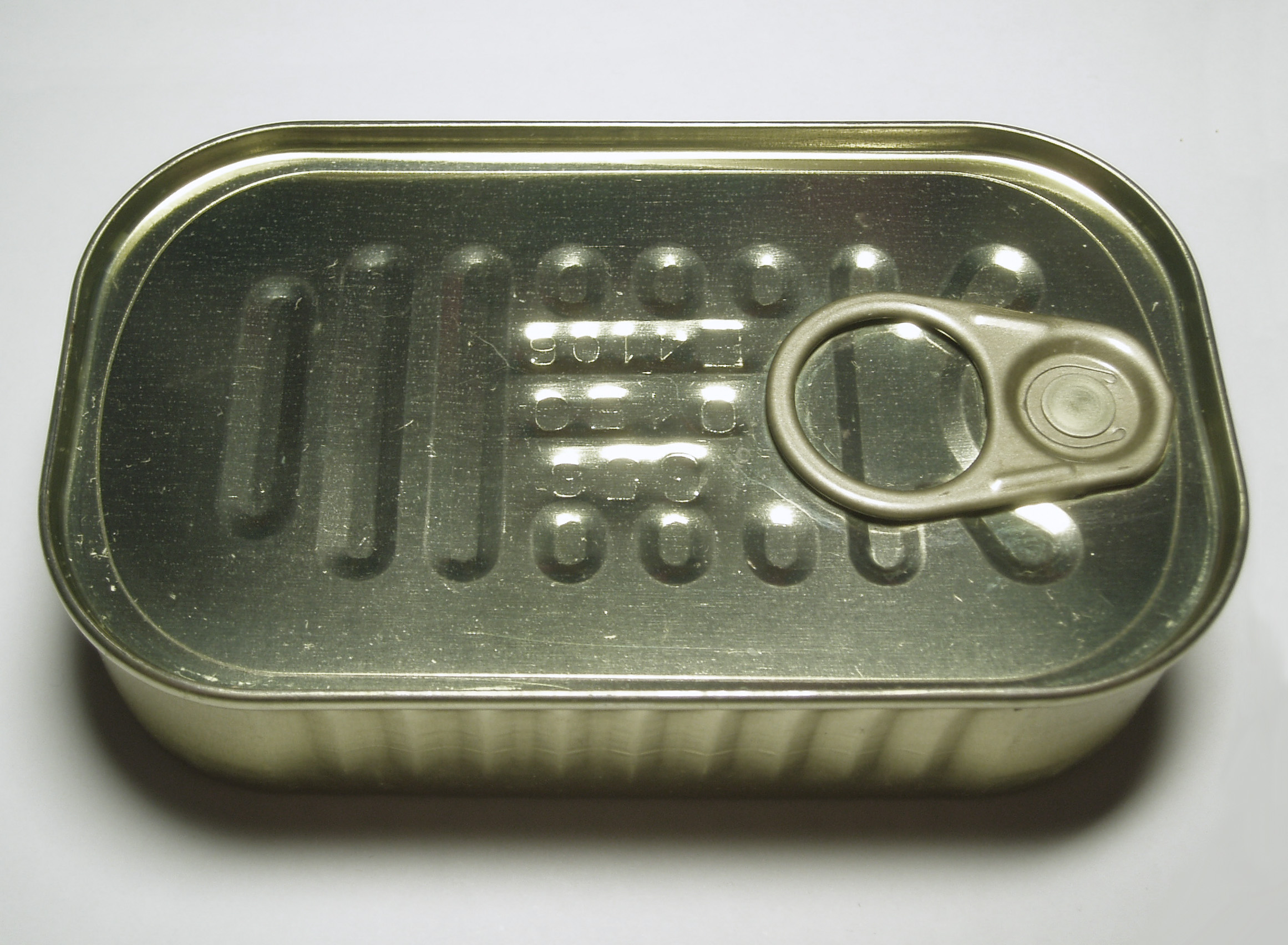
Sealed

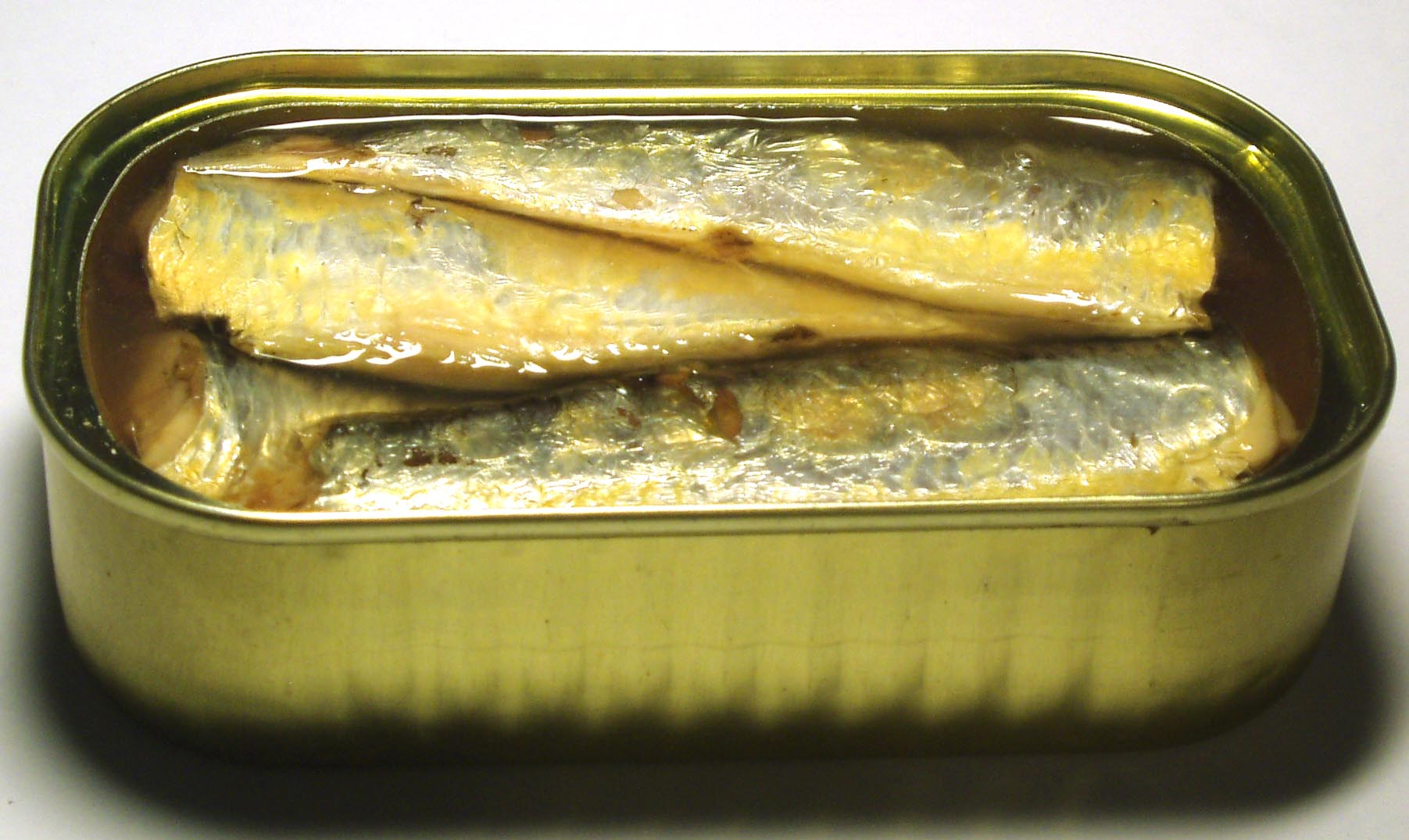
Opened

Sardines are canned in many different ways. At the cannery, the fish are washed, their heads are removed, and then smoked or cooked, either by deep-frying or by steam-cooking, after which they are dried. They are then packed in either olive, sunflower, or soybean oil; water; or in a tomato, chili, or mustard sauce.

Canned sardines in supermarkets may actually be sprat (such as the "brisling sardine") or round herrings. Fish sizes vary by species. Good-quality sardines should have the head and gills removed before packing. They may also be eviscerated before packing (typically the larger varieties). If not, they should be purged of undigested or partially digested food or feces by holding the live fish in a tank long enough for them to empty their digestive systems.

Sardines are typically tightly packed in a small can which is scored for easy opening, either with a pull tab like that on a beverage can or with a key attached to the bottom or side of the can.

The close packing of sardines in the can has led to their metaphorical use in the term "packed like sardines" to describe any situation where people or objects are crowded tightly together such as in public transit (see crush load) or in buildings like nightclubs. It has also been used as the name of a children's game, where one person hides and each successive person who finds the hidden one packs into the same space until only one is left out, who becomes the next one to hide.

== Around the world ==
=== Australia ===
There is a sardine fishery in Australia harvesting the species Sardinops sagax. The species occurs—in temperate waters, from inshore waters to the edge of the continental shelf, down to depths of about 200 metres—south from Hervey Bay, in Queensland to Shark Bay in Western Australia. Although there is a market for fresh fish for human consumption and fish processed as canned pet food, increasingly, it is mainly used to feed Southern bluefin tuna held in sea cages.

=== Canada ===
The last remaining sardine packing plant in North America is in Blacks Harbour, New Brunswick. The Brunswick brand, which started as the Connors Brothers in the 1880s, produces sardines (actually, juvenile herring, Clupea harengus) with many flavours. Brunswick claims to be the largest sardine producer in the world.

=== Canarias ===
In the Timanfaya Volcanic National Park on Lanzarote in the Canary Islands, a popular tourist snack is freshly caught sardines grilled over the heat from a volcanic vent.

=== Croatia ===
Fishing for sardela or sardina (Sardina pilchardus) on the coasts of Dalmatia and Istria began thousands of years ago. The region was part of the Roman Empire, then largely a Venetian dominion, and has always been sustained through fishing mainly sardines. All along the coast, many towns promote the age-old practice of fishing by lateen sail boats for tourism and on festival occasions. Today, industrial producers continue this tradition. Currently, the four factories of canned sardines are in Rovinj, Zadar, Postira, and Sali (the latter founded in 1905). Several famous dishes made with sardines include, for instance, komiška pogača (a pie with salted sardines and tomato sauce), saur or inšavor (sardines fried and then cooled, seasoned with olive oil, vinegar, garlic, black pepper and rosemary) and sardines roasted on stick from Sali, dugi otok.

=== England ===
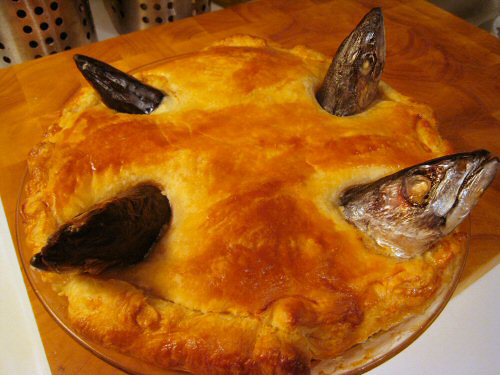
Stargazy pie - pilchards cooked in a pie crust that is made in Cornwall

Pilchard (Sardina pilchardus) fishing and processing was a thriving industry in Cornwall from around 1750 to around 1880, after which it went into an almost terminal decline. However, as of 2007, stocks are improving. Since 1997, sardines from Cornwall have been sold as "Cornish sardines", and since March 2010, under EU law, Cornish sardines have Protected Geographical Status. The industry has featured in numerous works of art, particularly by Stanhope Forbes and other Newlyn School artists. A traditional Cornish pilchard dish is stargazy pie.

=== France ===
Sardine fishing and canning is a traditional industry in Brittany, where most French canneries remain. The area is known as the place where sardine canning was invented. Douarnenez was the world's leading sardine exporter in the 19th century. The sardines are fried, dried, and then canned (this traditional process is labelled préparées à l'ancienne), whereas in most other countries, processing consists of steam cooking after canning.

=== Greece ===
Small oily fish like sardines have been a staple of the Greek diet since antiquity. Popular especially during the summer months of July and August, and praised as a high-quality healthy food source of protein and Omega-3 fatty acids, sardines are mostly consumed grilled with lemon and garlic, or cured in salt and olive oil (παστές, pastés). Both dishes are standard items in Greek-style seaside "taverna" restaurants, or in smaller establishments served as a treat (μεζές, meze) usually accompanied by ouzo. This does not leave out other ways of cooking sardines with local recipes and varieties.

The place most associated with sardines and their consumption as ouzomeze (ουζομεζές i.e. meze treat with ouzo) is the island of Lesvos. A fine kind of the fish called papalina thrives in the island's wide bay of Kalloni, and ouzo production has been a long tradition in the area of Plomari. A handful of manufacturers of Lesvos produce and export canned sardines, considered a local delicacy.

"Sardine festivals" are celebrated during summertime in Lesvos, as well as in many fishing communities elsewhere in Greece, which emphasize folklore aspects of traditional life and music, and allow for various amounts of fish consumption.

=== India ===
Sardine is a popular fish in the cuisines of Tamil Nadu, Kerala, Karnataka, Andhra Pradesh, and Goa. Sardines are typically eaten fresh, as canned sardines are not popular. Sardine is known as mathi (Tamil: மத்தி; Malayalam: മത്തി), saala (Tamil: சாளை; Malayalam: ചാള), kavallu (Telugu), khoira (Bengali: খয়রা), tarle (Konkani) or bhootai (Tulu). Sardines are cheaper in India than larger fish like seer or pomfret, making them a low-cost delicacy. They are consumed in various forms, including deep-fried, pan-fried, or curries of various types.

=== Italy ===
Owing to proximity with Sardinia, both the northern and southern regions of Italy claim main courses or appetizers with sardine fish as a primary ingredient. Sicily's regional dish, pasta con le sarde, is a spaghetti or bucatini entree with sardines, fennel seed, saffron, raisins, garlic, onion, olive oil, white wine, lemon juice, pureed tomato, toasted breadcrumbs, and crushed almonds. In Venice, sardines in saor is an antipasto that consists of sardine steaks marinated in white wine, raisins, and vinegar, subsequently covered in flour and fried in olive oil, then garnished with parsley, onions, crushed almonds, and raisins.

=== Japan ===
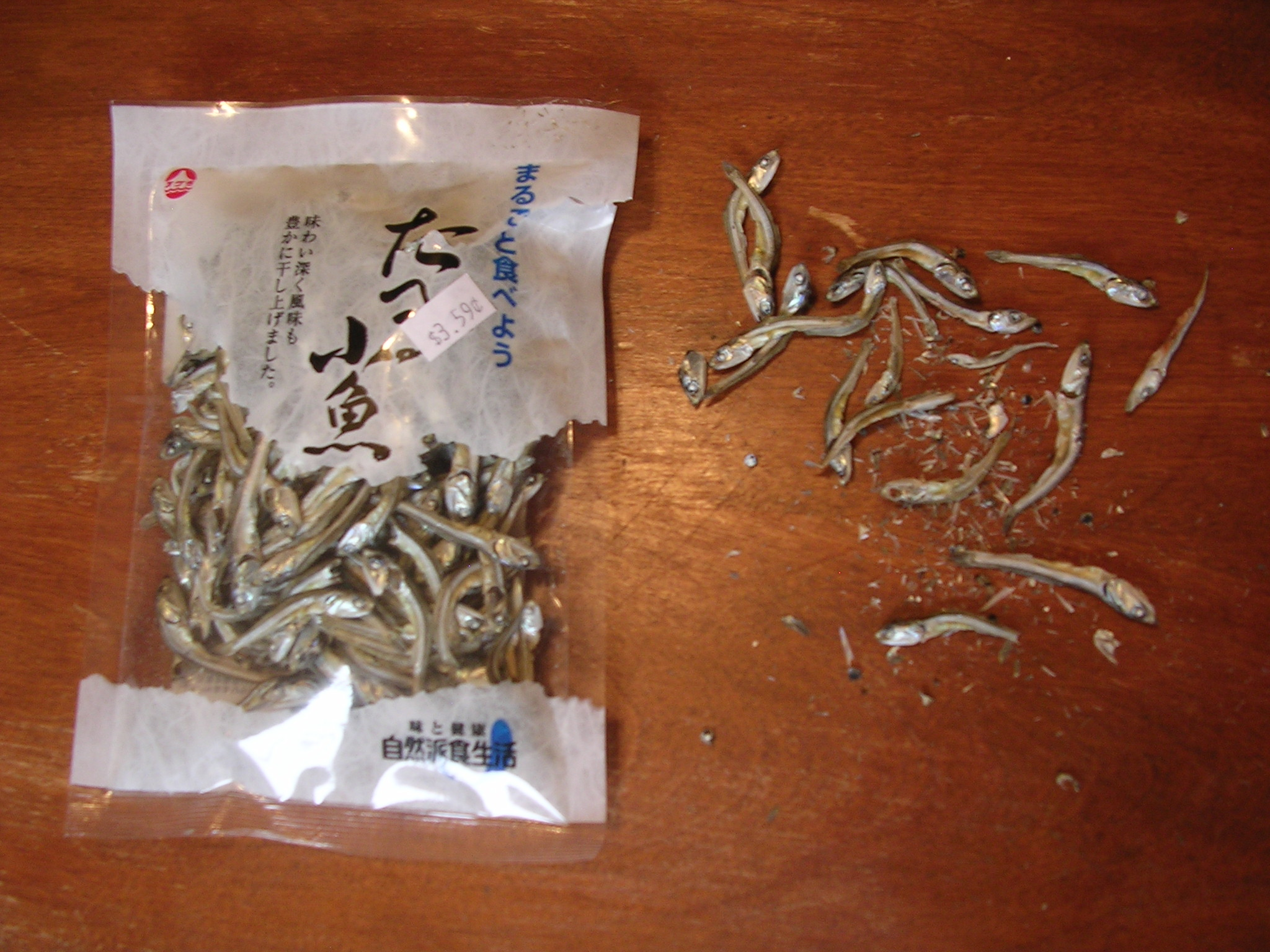
Dried niboshi (sardines) in and out of the package, used in Japanese cooking

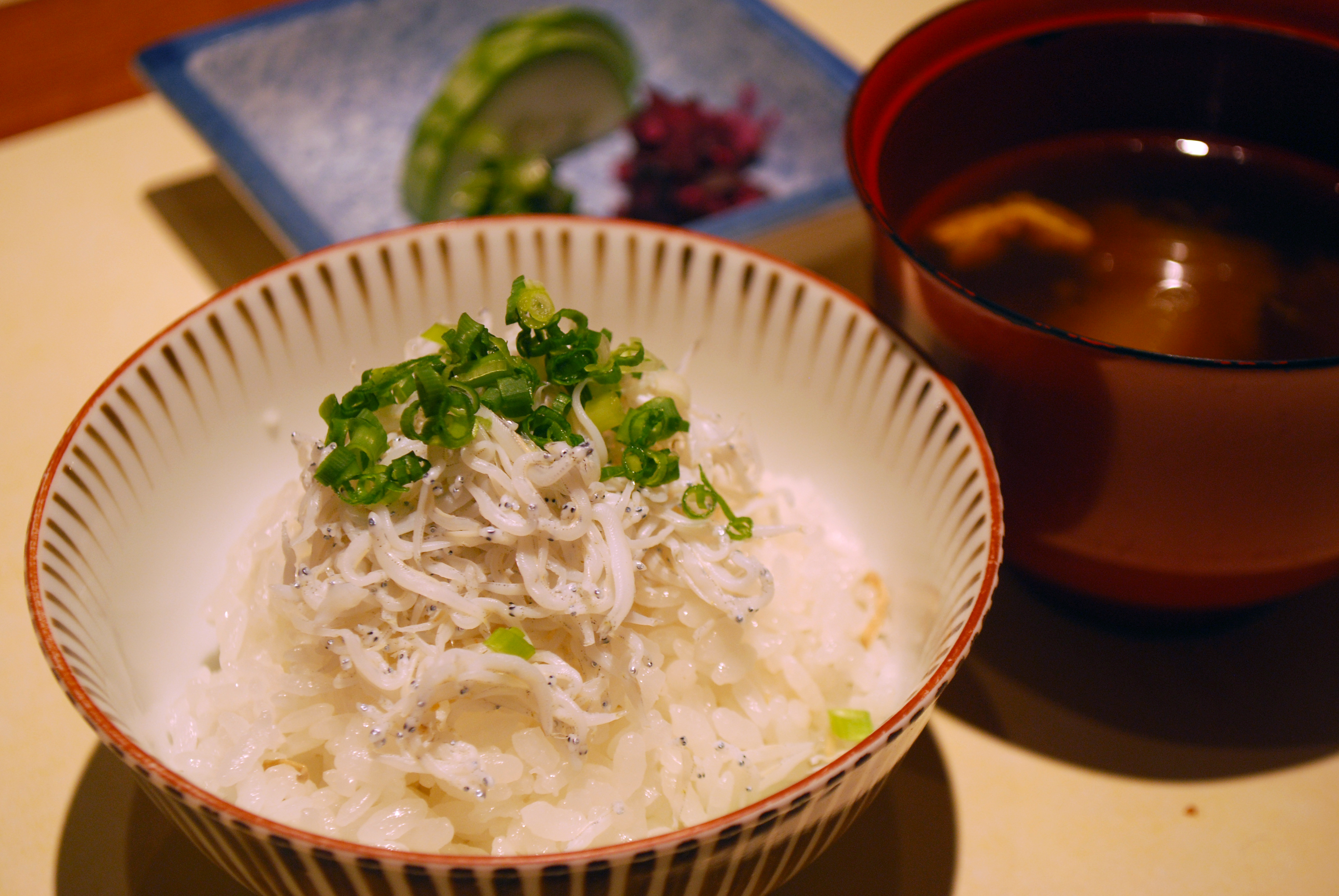
Young sardines on rice

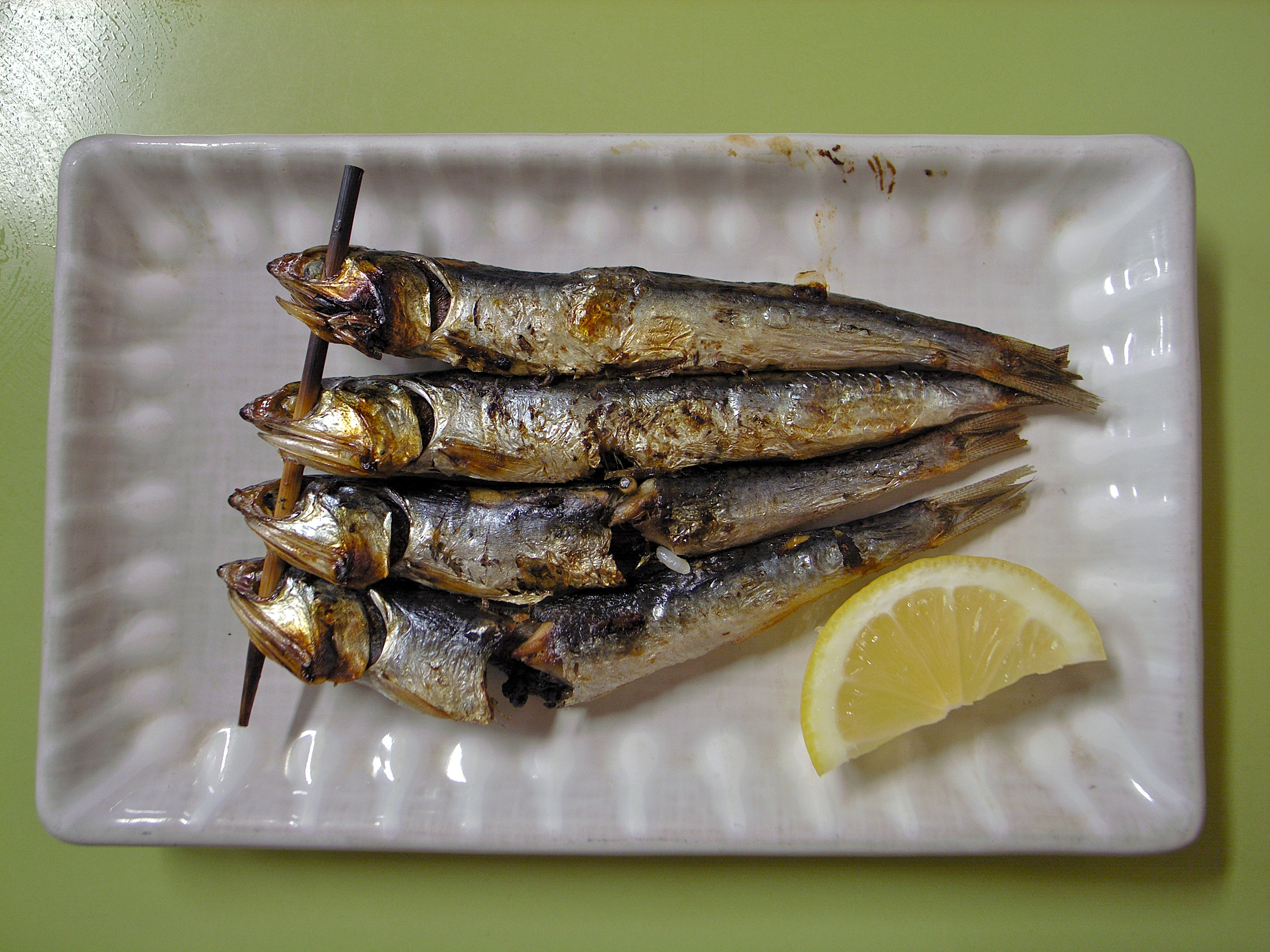
Sardines with lemon

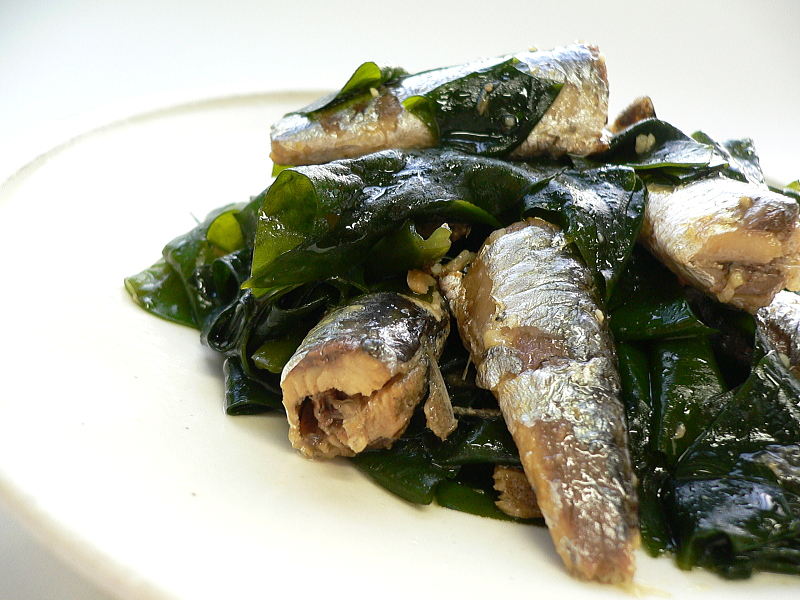
A Japanese dish with garlic, wakame, soy sauce, and "oil saldina"

Sardines, known as "Iwashi" in Japanese, have long been regarded as an important source of nutrition in Japan. Sardine bones have been discovered in shell mounds dating from the prehistoric Jōmon period.

- See also Tatami iwashi

=== Morocco ===
Morocco is the largest canned sardine exporter in the world and the leading supplier of sardines to the European market. Sardines represent more than 62% of the Moroccan fish catch and account for 91% of raw material usage in the domestic canning industry. Some 600,000 tonnes of fresh sardines are processed each year by the industry. Famous Moroccan recipes include Moroccan fried stuffed sardines and Moroccan sardine balls in spicy tomato sauce.

=== Norway ===
Until the discovery of oil fields in the fishing areas, sardine canning was the main activity of the city of Stavanger. Today, only a sardine museum remains among the refineries in Stavanger.

=== Peru ===
Peru has a long history of direct human consumption of Engraulis ringens and other sardines, reaching into ancient cultures, including Chimú culture, Paracas culture, Pachacamac, and most importantly the oldest known civilization in the Americas, the Caral-Supe civilization, which was based almost completely on E. ringens consumption. Nonetheless, since the 1950s, the overwhelming destination for captured E. ringens (anchoveta or Peruvian sardine) has been as the principal input for reduction fishery in the production of fishmeal and fish oil, with minuscule quantities destined for direct human consumption. Due to a combination of environmental and regulatory effects, since 2000, the Peruvian catch has ranged from 9.58 million metric tons (MT) to a low of 5.35 million MT, with the reported 2009 catch concluding at 5.35 million MT. In recent years, direct human consumption (local and for export) has reached about 110,000 MT (about 2% of catch) due to evangelical promotion of health, environmental, and economic benefits, such as Mistura 2010, coupled with government and NGO activities, e.g. www.anchoveta.info, and private-sector offers from local supermarkets.

=== Philippines ===
Known mainly as "sardinas" regardless of the actual species, sardines are a staple especially of lower-class families in the Philippines due to their relatively cheap prices. They are also commonly used as relief goods in times of disaster. Sardines are among those fished by coastal communities, such as those who live in Manila Bay.

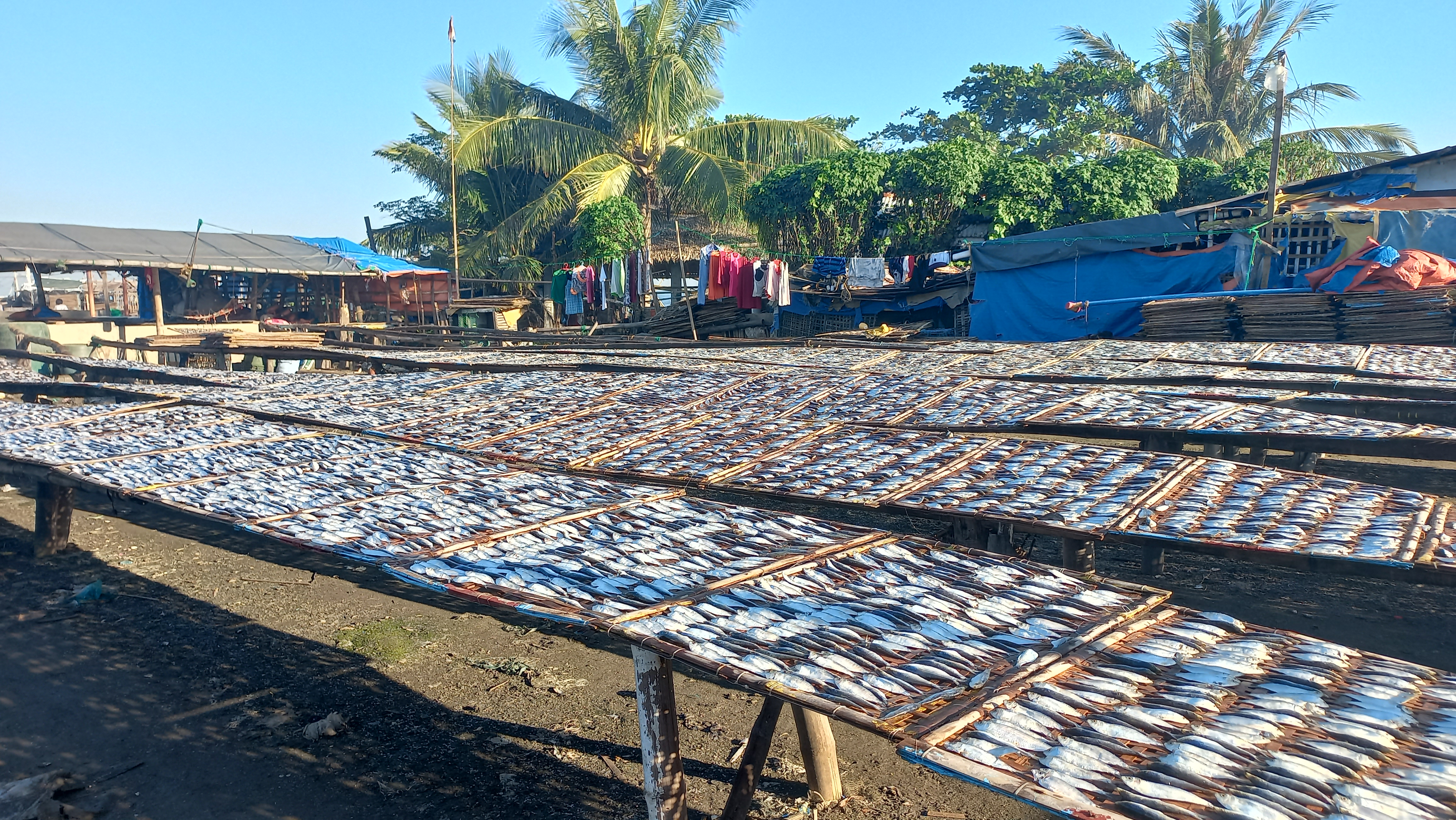
Sardine fish being dried under the Sun in Cavite, Philippines

=== Portugal ===
Sardines play an important role in Portuguese cuisine and culture. Historically a people who depend heavily on the sea for food and commerce, the Portuguese have a predilection for fish in their popular festivities. The most important is Saint Anthony's day, June 13, when Portugal's biggest popular festival takes place in Lisbon, where grilled sardines are the snack of choice. Almost every place in Portugal, from Figueira da Foz to Portalegre, from Póvoa de Varzim to Olhão, has the summertime tradition of eating grilled sardines (sardinhas assadas).

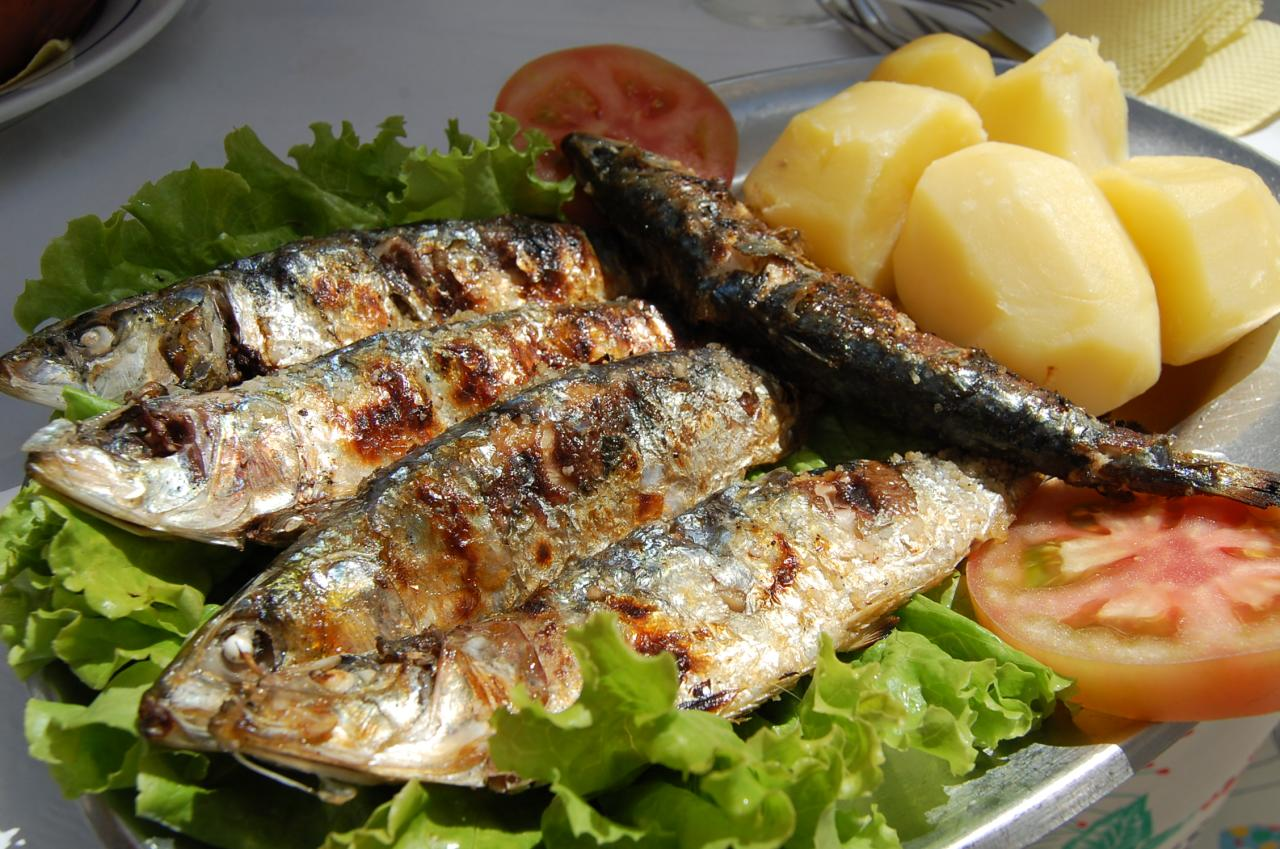
Portuguese grilled sardines on lettuce, with potato

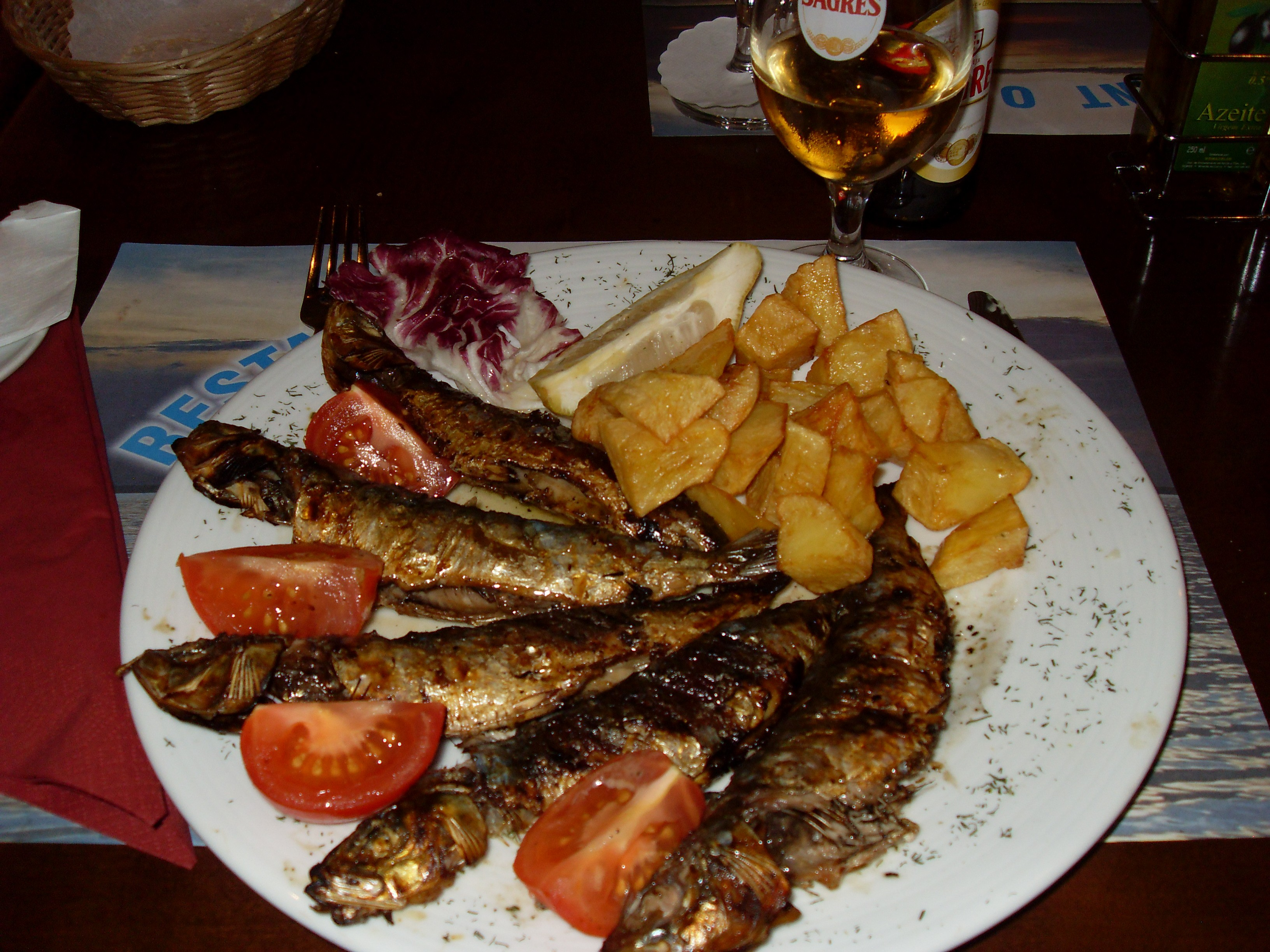
Grilled sardines with tomato and potato, Portugal

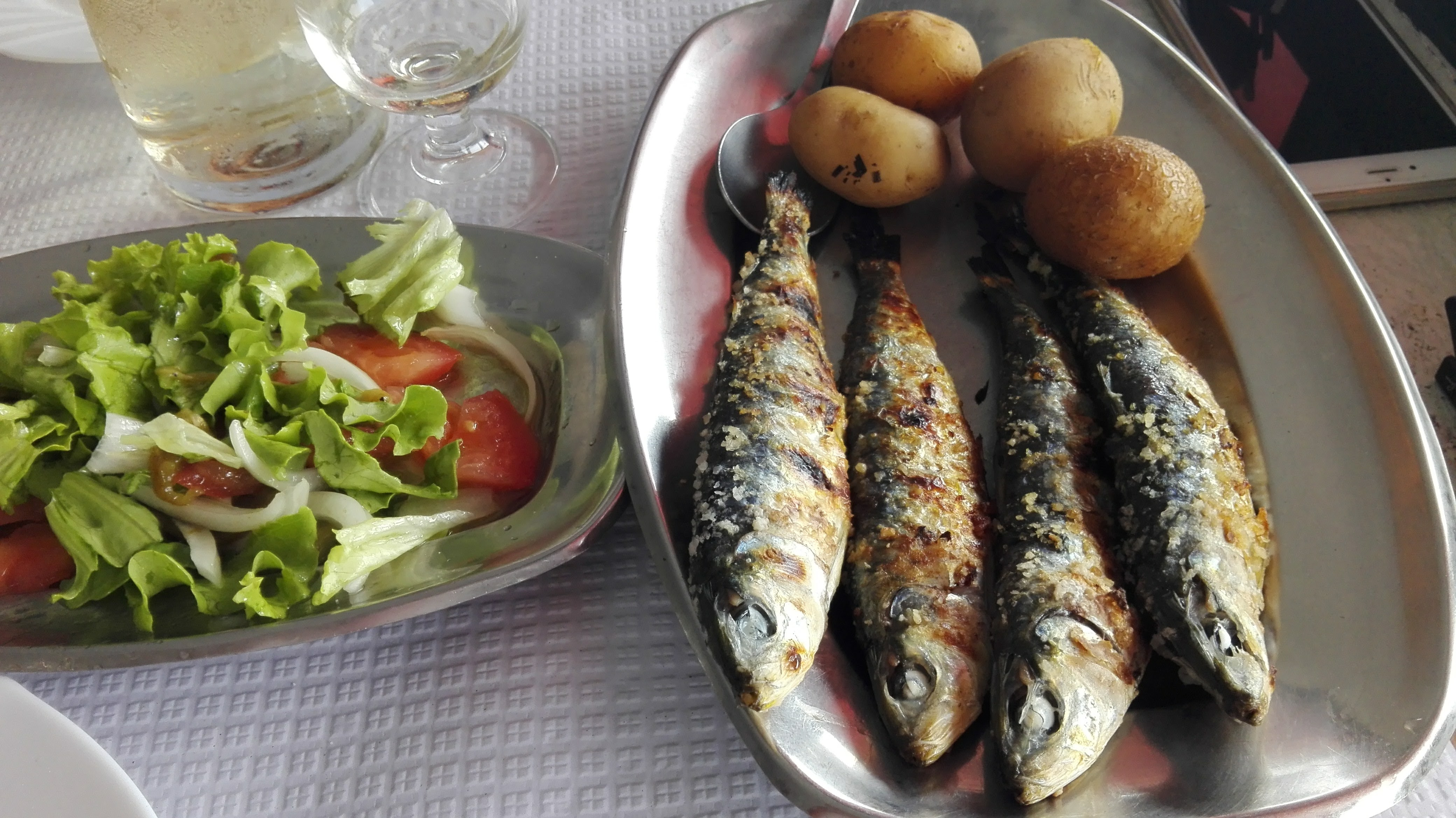
Grilled sardines with potato and salad, Portugal

=== Spain ===
On the Atlantic coast, fried sardines are commonly served as tapas with drinks or as the first course of a meal. On the Mediterranean coast, grilling is more common. In Spain, sardine canning processes have been described since the 19th century, with the first mass production factories established in Isla Cristina and Ayamonte in 1888, in response to those previously set up in Vila Real de Santo António (Portugal) primarily for canning sardines (and tuna).

Overfishing of this species is bringing it closer to the danger of extinction in the Iberian Peninsula.

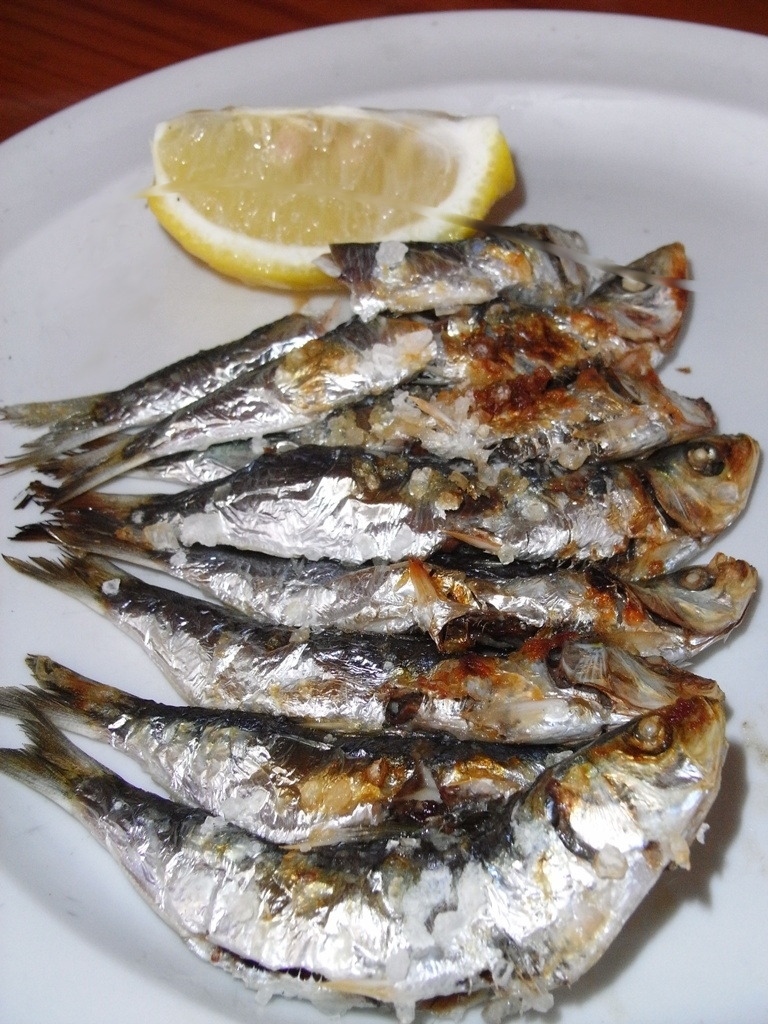
Sardines with lemon, Spain

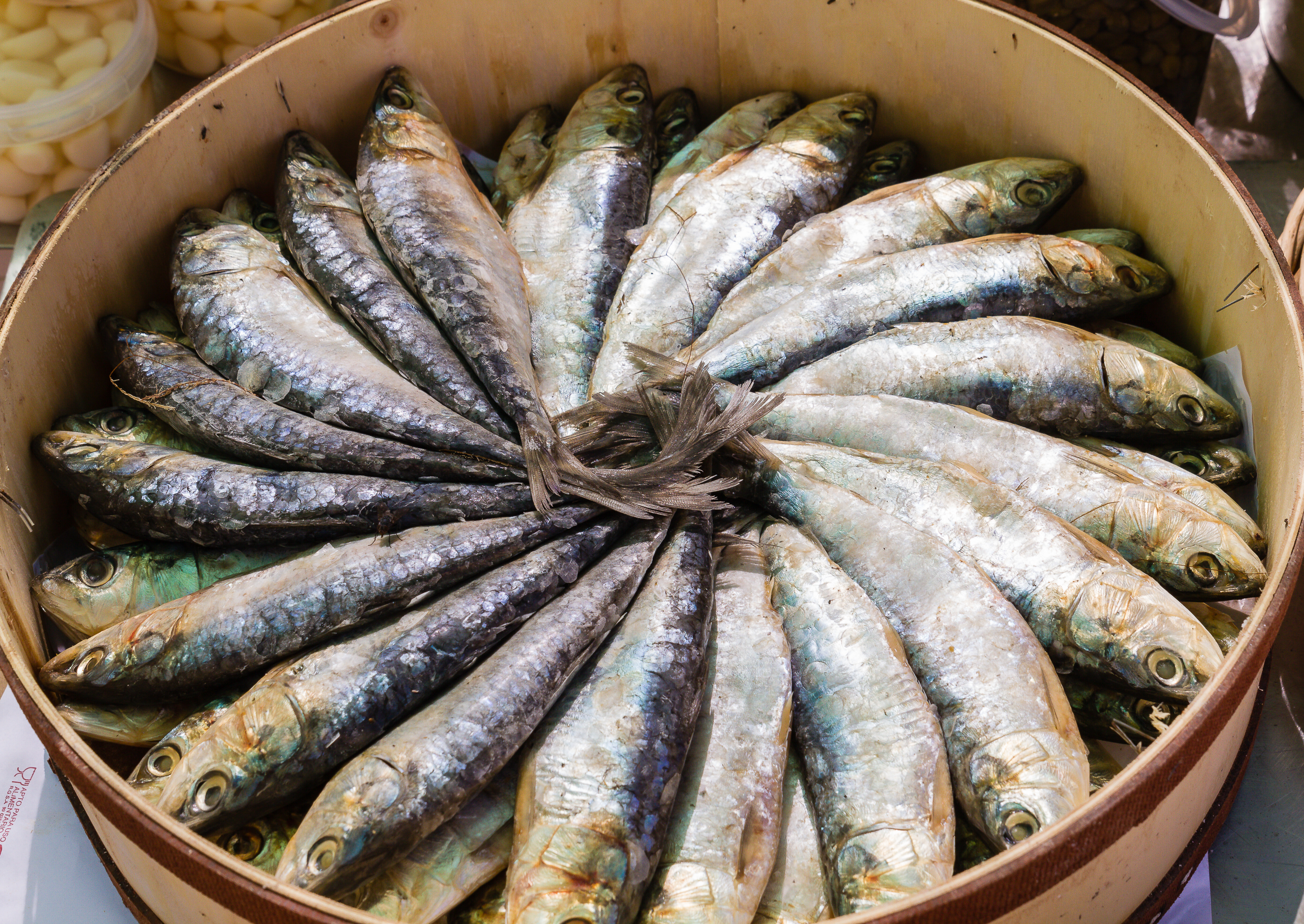
Pickled sardines at a market on the Spanish island of Majorca

=== Turkey ===
Sardines (sardalya in Turkish), a delicacy in Turkish cuisine, are very commonly found in fish markets throughout coastal western regions of Turkey. They are generally prepared grilled or steamed in ovens, most commonly served as a main course alongside alcoholic beverages, most notably rakı, the archetypal Turkish liquor. Particularly in the Gallipoli peninsula and in the Aegean region of Turkey, sardines are oven-cooked rolled in grape leaves. They are also canned especially in factories in coastal cities such as Istanbul, Gelibolu, Çanakkale, Bandırma, Karadeniz Ereğli, Ordu, and Trabzon.

=== United States ===
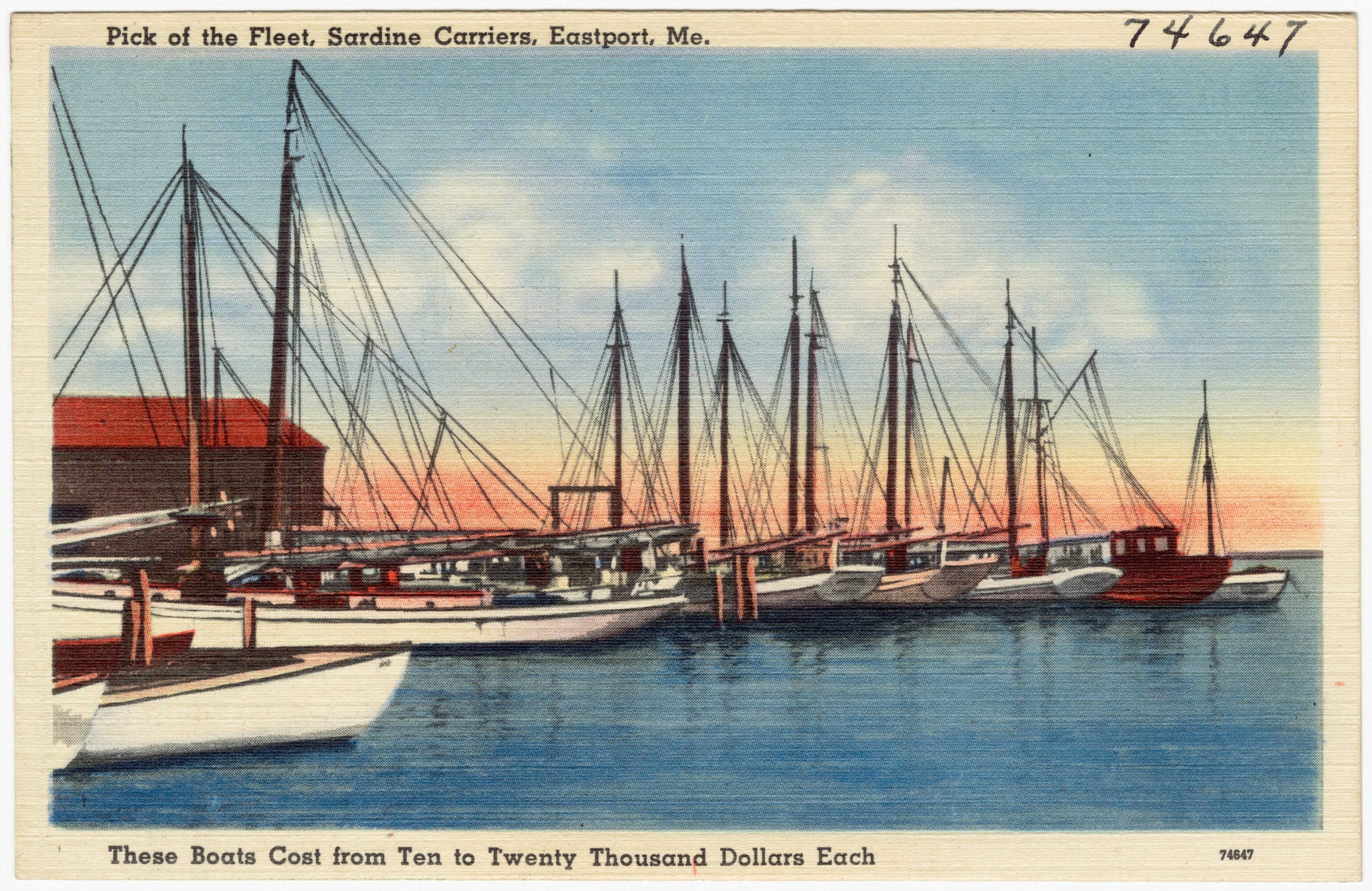
Sardine fleet in Maine c. 1940s

In the United States, the sardine canning industry peaked in the 1950s. Since then, the industry has been on the decline. The last large sardine cannery in the United States, the Stinson Seafood plant in Prospect Harbor, Maine, closed its doors on April 15, 2010, after 135 years in operation. During the COVID-19 pandemic, sardines and other tinned fish enjoyed a resurgence, including the establishment of boutique manufacturers.

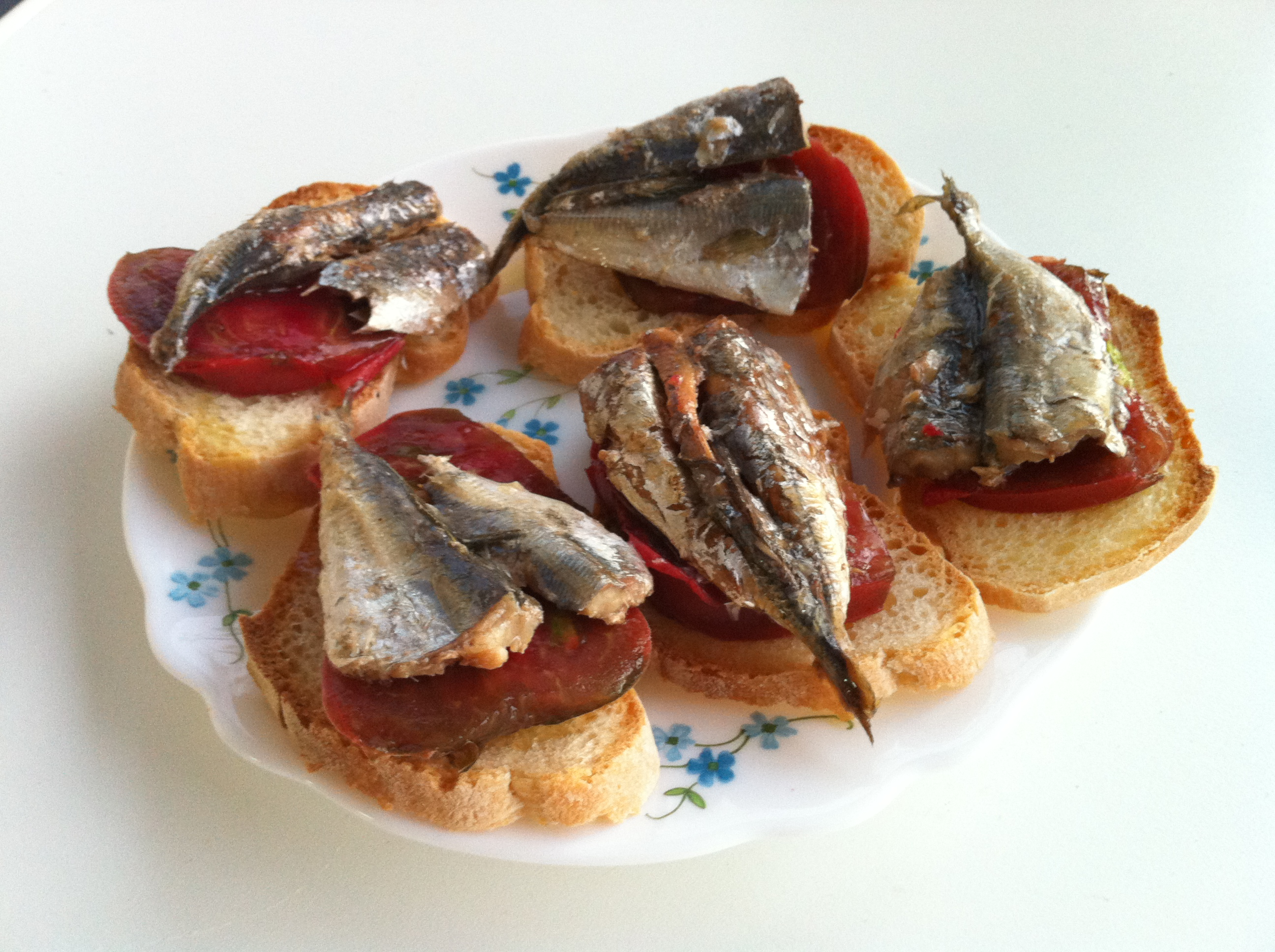
Sardines and tomato on toast

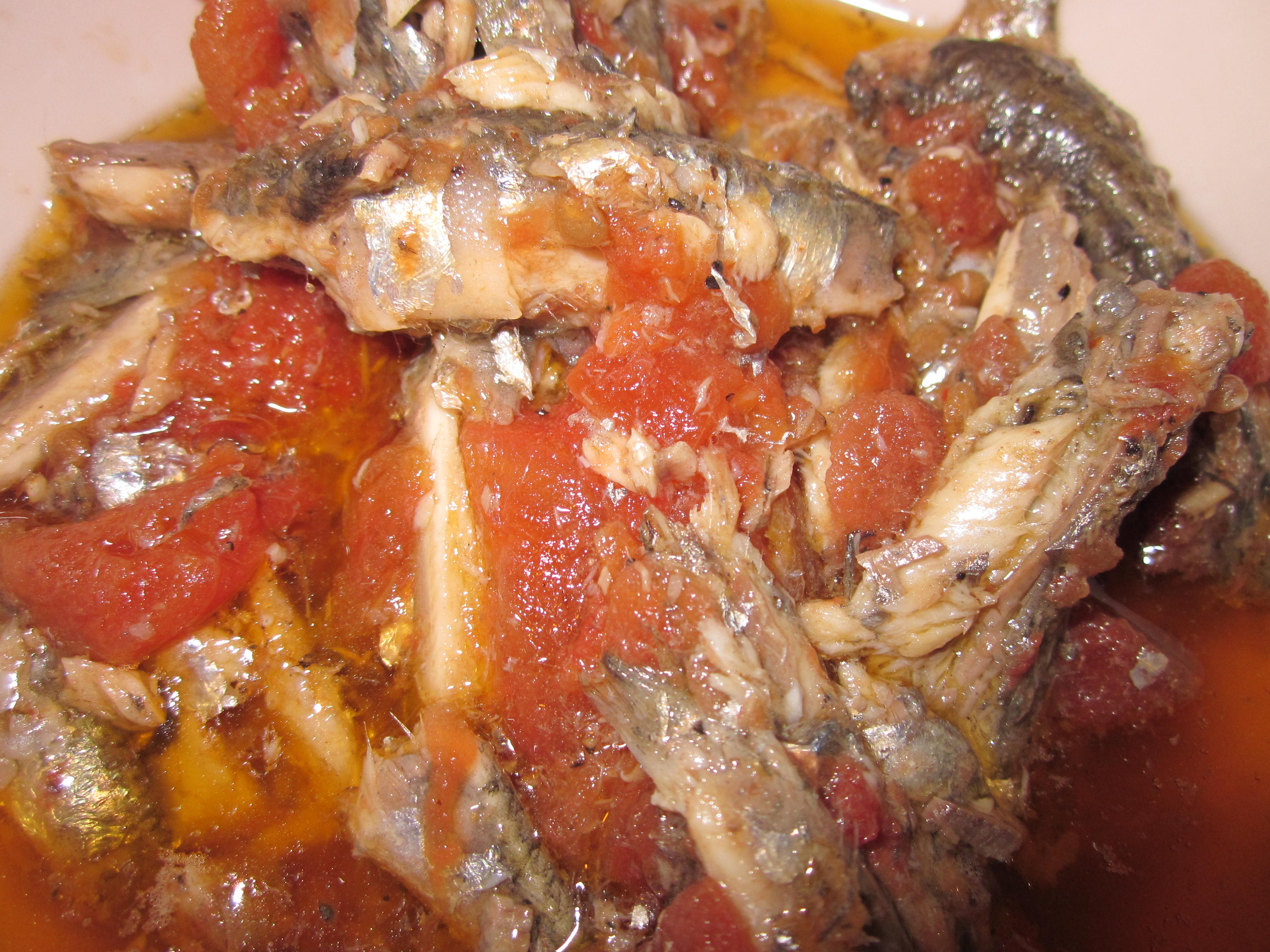
Sardines in olive oil and tomato sauce

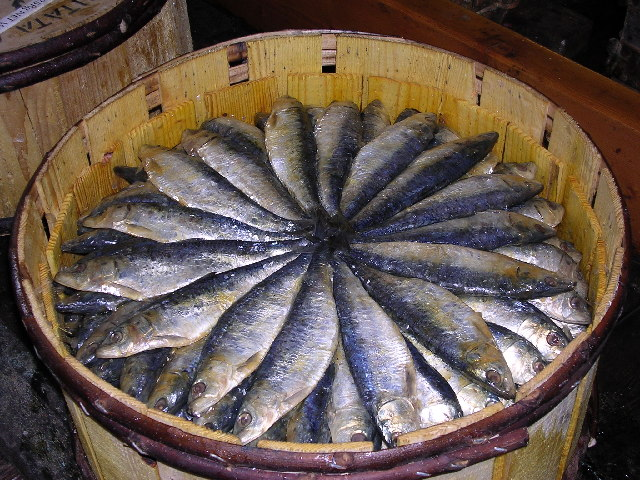
Cornish pilchards salted and packed in crates for shipping to Italy

== See also ==
- Cannery Row, Monterey, California
- List of smoked foods
- Sardine run, an event in South Africa
- Xouba, a small sardine from Spain
