= Entierro de la Sardina =

Spanish carnival ceremony

The "Burial of the Sardine" (Spanish: Entierro de la sardina) also known as Burial of the xoubiña since 1851, is an annual Spanish ceremony celebrating the end of carnival and other festivities. The "Burials" generally consist of a carnival parade that parodies a funeral procession and culminates with the burning of a symbolic figure, usually a representation of a sardine. The "Burial of the Sardine” is celebrated on Ash Wednesday and is a symbolical burial of the past to allow society to be reborn, transformed and with new vigour.

Many Spanish festivals end with ceremonies in which a symbol representing the excesses of the festival is burned or destroyed — although some have been lost, others have been revived. Similar celebrations include the "Fiesta del Judas", the "Judas Party" (la quema del haragán), and the "Burning of the Raspajo" (la quema del raspajo). The burning of an effigy represents a regeneration and liberation — the passage of the symbol through the fire represents a purging of the vices and a restoration of the order temporarily subverted during the festival; in ceremonies of symbolical burial, the theme is one of reflection.

== Popular culture ==
- The Burial of the Sardine (1812–1819) an oil-on-panel painting of a ceremony in Madrid by Francisco Goya.

== See also ==
- Xouba
