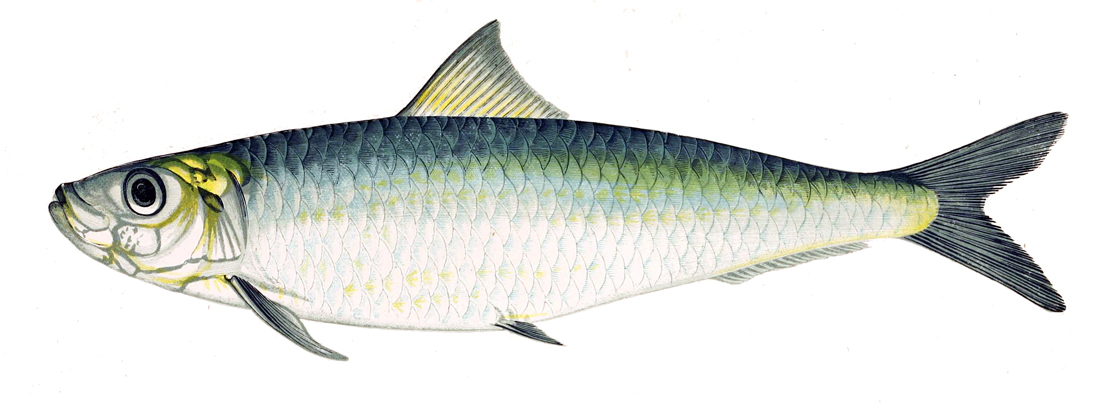

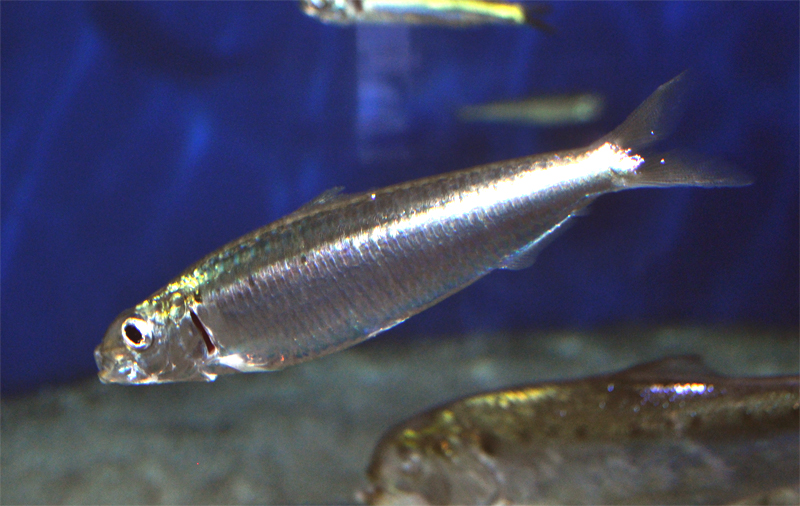

Conservation status
- Least Concern (IUCN 3.1)

Scientific classification
- Kingdom: Animalia
- Phylum: Chordata
- Class: Actinopterygii
- Order: Clupeiformes
- Family: Alosidae
- Genus: Sardina; Antipa, 1904
- Species: S. pilchardus

Binomial name
- Sardina pilchardus (Walbaum, 1792)

Synonyms
- Alosa pilchardus; Clupea pilchardus; Clupea harengus pilchardus

= European pilchard =

Species of fish

The European pilchard (Sardina pilchardus) is a species of ray-finned fish in the monotypic genus Sardina. The young of the species are among the many fish that are sometimes called sardines. This common species is found in the northeast Atlantic, the Mediterranean, and the Black Sea at depths of 10–100 m (33–328 ft). It reaches up to 27.5 cm (10.8 in) in length and mostly feeds on planktonic crustaceans. This schooling species is a batch spawner where each female lays 50,000–60,000 eggs.

== Description ==
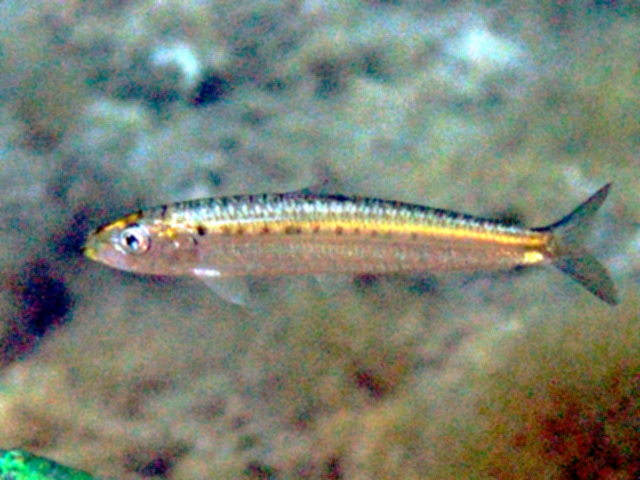

The European pilchard is a small to medium-sized (15–25cm in length) somewhat elongated, herring-like fish. The origin of the pelvic fins is well behind that of the dorsal fin, and the last two soft rays on the anal fin are larger than the remainder. The upper parts are green or olive, the flanks are golden and the belly is silvery.

Not to be confused with its American counterpart, the California pilchard, Sardinops sagax, the European sardine Sardina pilchardus does not have a row of dark blotches. They also have scales that are in an irregular order. Ventral scutes on the European species have sturdier keels that are also more keeled. Gillrakers are significantly different from those on Sardinops sagax.

== Distribution and habitat ==
The European pilchard occurs in the northeastern Atlantic Ocean, the Mediterranean Sea and the Black Sea. Its range extends from Iceland and the southern part of Norway and Sweden southwards to Senegal in West Africa. In the Mediterranean Sea it is common in the western half and the Adriatic Sea, but uncommon in the eastern half and the Black Sea. It is a migratory, schooling, largely coastal species but sometimes travels as far as 100 km (62 mi) out to sea. During the day it is mostly in the depth range 25 to 55 m (80 to 180 ft) but can go as deep as 100 m (330 ft). At night it is generally from 10 to 35 m (33 to 115 ft) beneath the surface.

== Taxonomy ==
S. pilchardus is part of the Clupeidae family along with over 300 other species. Also known as the North Atlantic-Mediterranean sardine, it was the first sardine to be described. It was originally put under Clupea from 1842 to 1879. Under this genus, Gunther (1868) gave a general description of a terminal mouth, minute or absent teeth, a complete midventral series of scutes, and an anal fin. However, Regan (1916,1917) divided the genus into two subgenus: the subtropical Sardina and tropical Sardinella. S. pilchardus and two other species (e.g. S. sagax and S. neopilchardus) were put under Sardina. Between the two, gill raker counts and head length distinctions differentiate each genus.

Svetovidov (1952) noted common characteristics within the Clupidae family which include: a more anterior dorsal fin, a more developed lateral line canal in the head, last two fin rays of the anal fin are elongated lobes, dark lateral pigment spots, elongated scales on the base of caudal fin lobes, interrupted transverse striations on body scales, and radial striations on the operculum of Sardina and Sardinops. A distinguishing feature of the Sardina from other genera is the body scales, which vary in size. Smaller scales are hidden underneath the larger scales. Otolith variations are most likely attributed to environmental differences as opposed to genetic variation in S. pilchardus.

== Ecology ==
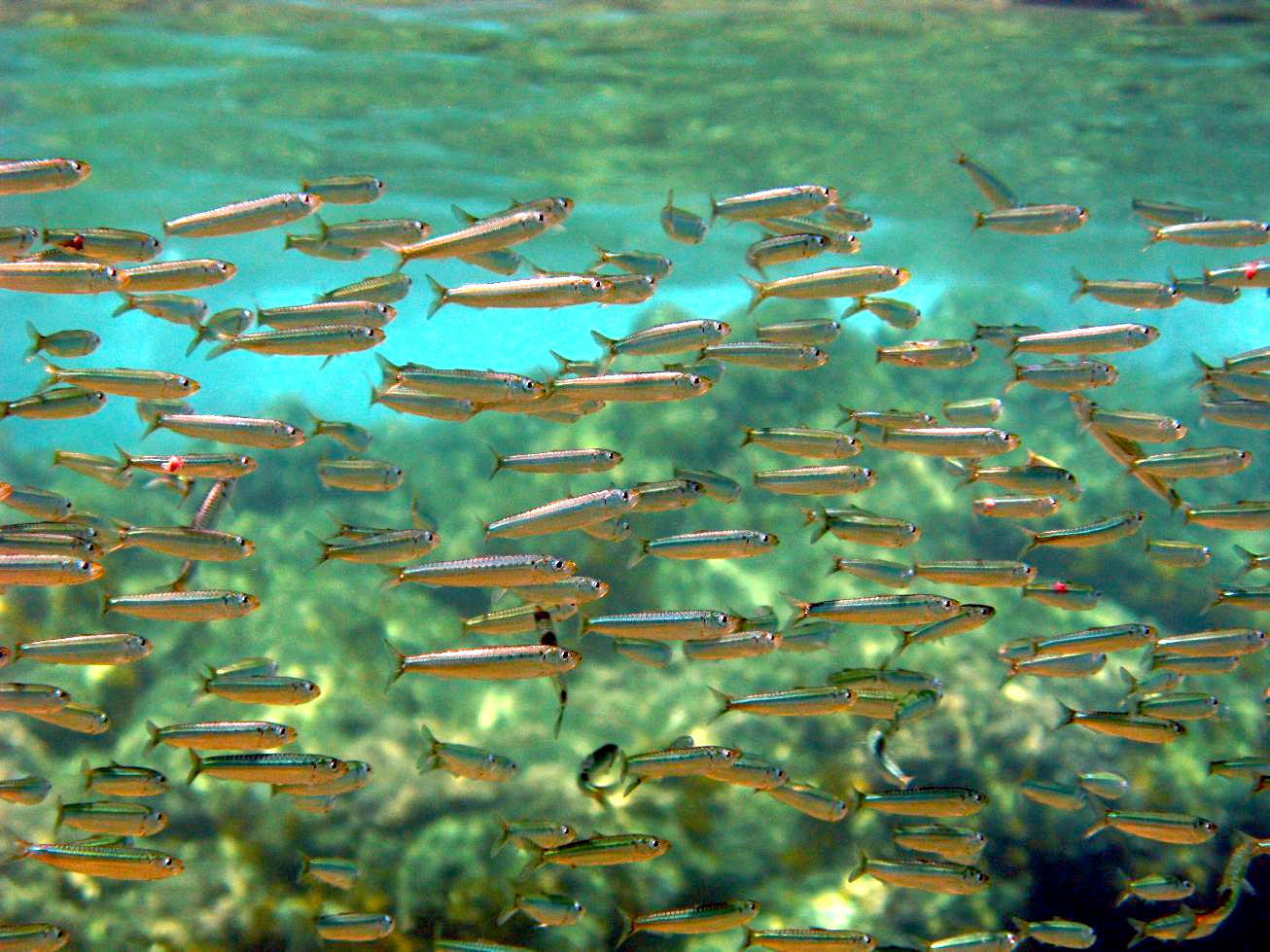
Juveniles schooling by day in shallow water in the Ligurian Sea, Italy

In the Mediterranean, the European pilchard moves offshore in the autumn, preferring the deeper cooler waters and constant salinity out at sea to the variable temperatures and salinities of inshore waters. Spawning for S. pilchardus occurs in open waters with long larval periods. S. pilchardus is a capital breeder — it stores energy during a specific period (i.e. spring-summer) and then uses it for reproduction. Spawning starts to take place in winter, and in early spring, juveniles, larvae and some adults move towards the coast, while other adults migrate inshore later in the year. Multiple batches of eggs are produced over a long breeding period, total fecundity being 50,000 to 60,000. Most juveniles become sexually mature at about a year old and a length of 13 to 14 cm (5.1 to 5.5 in); pilchards are fully grown at about 21 cm (8.3 in) when aged about eight years.

The diet consists of both zooplankton and phytoplankton. The zooplankton is largely copepods and their larvae, which make daily vertical migrations to feed near the surface at night, and this is when the adult pilchards feed on them; juveniles feed during the day as well. Along with the European anchovy (Engraulis encrasicolus), the European pilchard plays an important intermediate role in the Mediterranean ecosystem as a consumer of plankton and as a food for larger demersal predators such as the European hake (Merluccius merluccius) and the European conger eel (Conger conger). This role is particularly noticeable in the Adriatic Sea where the water is shallow, the food chain is shorter and energy is retained within the basin; overfishing of pilchard and anchovy can thus cause dramatic changes in the ecosystem.

S. pilchardus is a short-lived, fast-maturing, and highly fecund species. At both the larval and adult stages of its life history, it has a high ability to disperse which results in high gene flow and thus low genetic differentiation between subareas of the Mediterranean.

Nematodes found in S. pilchardus include the Anisakidae and Raphidascarididae. However, despite being a widely eaten fish around Europe, especially in the Mediterranean, only eight cases of human anisakidosis have been reported since 1991. A study by Fuentes et al. (2022) show that the consumption of S. pilchardus poses an unlikely health hazard for parasite infection of Anisakis spp., even when consumed raw or lack of adequate preparation through freezing. But as with all fish consumed raw, proper precautions should be taken, such as consumption of sardines caught in the Mediterranean and smaller specimens. Additionally, consultation of labels and traceability data can help to further minimize risk.

== Fisheries and uses ==
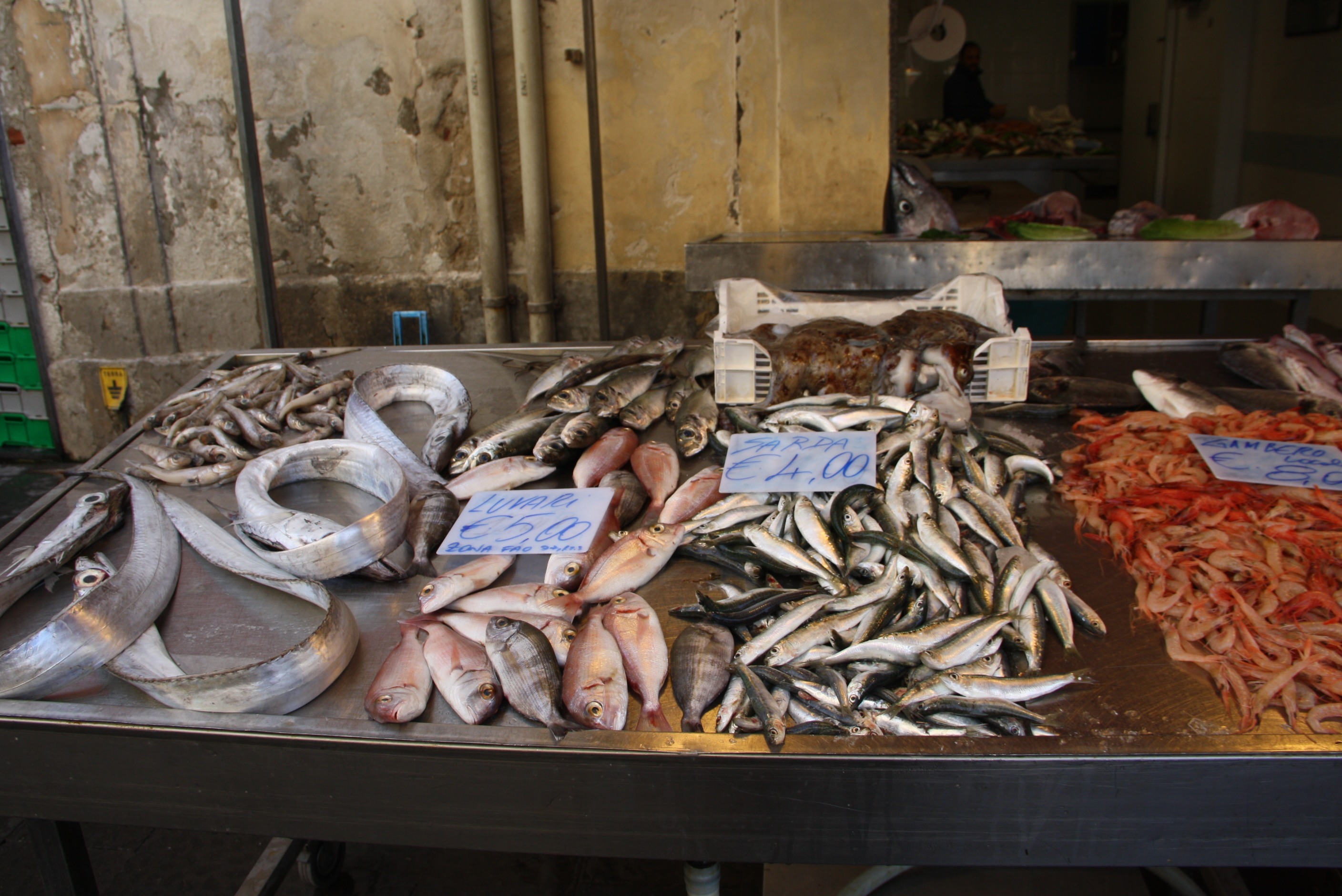
European pilchards, center right, are the cheapest thing for sale at this fish stall in Syracuse, Sicily

Global capture production of European pilchard (Sardina pilchardus) in million tonnes from 1950 to 2022, as reported by the FAO

There are important fisheries for this species in most of its range. It is mainly caught with purse seines and lampara nets, but other methods are also used including bottom trawling with high opening nets. S. pilchardus is one of the most heavily impacted species impacted by fisheries in the Mediterranean region. In a 2022 report from the Fishery Committee for The Eastern Central Atlantic (CECAF), S. pilchardus attributed to 48% of overall small pelagic species catch, or the equivalent of 2.3 million tons, with Morocco, Portugal and Spain having the largest catches. As such, S. pilchardus has a huge economic impact on the surrounding land regions. The Food and Agriculture Organization (FAO) considers the Moroccan fishery overfished.

Globally, Sardina pilchardus ranks number eight for most captured species. However, recently, sardines in the Mediterranean regions have shown lower growth, fecundity, and spawning rates than those in Atlantic regions. This has been possibly attributed to the oligotrophy of the Mediterranean. In addition, a decreasing trend of S. pilchardus biomass has occurred. A possible explanation could be that the disappearance of older fish due to a less-than-ideal environment and fishing pressure could be the cause of declining biomass of S. pilchardus.

Little is known about status of the stock of S. pilchardus despite the economic dependency on the surrounding nations, particularly in the West African region ^{[9]}. Some research has been conducted to determine if there are distinct genetic and morphological differences between certain stocks within their range. According to Baldé et al. (2022), "plasticity in the growth performance, survival, and other life-history characteristics […] is the key to their dynamics." They are sensitive to environmental changes and are good indicators of how climate change is impacting marine environments.

The adults may be sold as pilchards; the juveniles, as sardines. The terms "sardine" and "pilchard" are not precise, and what is meant depends on the region. The United Kingdom's Sea Fish Industry Authority, for example, classifies sardines as young pilchards. One criterion suggests fish shorter in length than 15 cm (6 in) are sardines, and larger fish are pilchards. The FAO/WHO Codex standard for canned sardines cites 21 species that may be classed as sardines.

Xouba is a small version of the pilchard which is prevalent in Galicia, Spain. Xouba means little fish; the fish lives is shallow areas of water between 5 m (16 ft) and 50 m (160 ft).

The fish is sold fresh, frozen or canned, or is salted and smoked or dried; as the flesh is of low value, some of the catch is used for fishing bait or fertilizer and some is manufactured into fish meal.

== Genetics ==
Mitochondrial sequence data have shown evidence of an early genetic bottleneck in Safi and a significant genetic differentiation within the sardine population. However, this has been challenging for researchers to definitively claim due to large population sizes and the sardine's high dispersal ability. Additionally, the lack of oceanographic barriers allow for further gene flow between populations.

Eight micro-satellite loci showed polymorphism and no significant linkage disequilibrium. Due to possible homozygote excess and null alleles, most loci showed differences from the Hardy-Weinberg Equilibrium. Further tests showed that the S. pilchardus populations from across nine locations over the Atlantic Ocean and Mediterranean Sea act as one evolutionary unit. Slight genetic differences found could be attributed to isolation by distance. Thus, there is support for two distinct groups via mitochondrial data, while micro-satellite data supports weak genetic structure within an evolutionary unit.

Mitochondrial and micro-satellite analyses of the Sp2, Sp7, Sp8 and Sp15 loci with biologic parameter and genetic analysis show homogeneity in the Atlantic Moroccan coast population of S. pilchardus. In Baibai et al. (2017)'s biologic and morphometric analysis, they found high variability within the stocks of the Moroccan Atlantic, with two distinct morphological groups that are geographically separated in the Northwest African Coast and South region of Morocco. Specifically, northern Moroccan sardines have a smaller head to body ratio than those in the south. These are in addition to the established differences in the position of the pelvic and anal fin between the same groups. The morphological differences, however, are not genetically based. Instead, it is the result of phenotypic plasticity, a trait known to help sardine stocks survive in the different waters that they inhabit.

A genetic analysis of relevant microsatellite loci and mitochondrial analysis further support the claim of non-genetically based phenotypic difference. All four loci studied were analyzed to be independent of each other. Of note, loci Sp2 and Sp8 carried a high number of private alleles, although this is consistent with other marine fishes. These same two loci are responsible for the small genetic structure found in S. pilchardus. Due to homozygote excess and null alleles, significant values of the inbreeding coefficient, F_{is}, was found in Safi, Malaga, and Cadiz. Mitochondrial analysis showed significant genetic structure compared to previous analyses with significant nucleotide differences and higher nucleotide diversity in Cap Blanc and Galician samples. Possible explanations for the isolation of certain populations could be explained by gyres or upwelling, such as that in south Morocco, along with distance.

== Stocks ==
In a study by Huertas et al. (2023), S. pilchardus somatic condition, relative condition, hepasomatic indices, and reproductive condition were used to compare four sub areas of the Mediterranean: Northern Alboran, Northern Spain, Northern Adriatic, and Aegean Sea. The study found that there are differences in energy storage that are supported by underlying genetic differences. Thus, there is heterogeneity in regard to reproduction.

Northern Spain showed the lowest somatic condition patterns. This subarea has also had a decline in older fish which limits the plasticity of sardines to environmental changes and thus affects spawn quality. However, the Northern Adriatic stock has an overall body mass above that of the other stocks. This could be due to year-round accessibility to feeding resources. Furthermore, the main phytoplankton bloom in this area coincides with sardine reproductive season. But phytoplankton still only accounts for around 10% of its diet, with copepods being the majority (56%). The study found that because reproduction is dependent availability of resources, the Northern Adriatic population's storage period is not as distinctive as other stocks.

Northern Alboran stock was recorded to show earlier gonad maturation in the summer than their Atlantic neighbors. The authors speculate individuals from the Atlantic swim into the Mediterranean, spawn, and the drop in temperature along the Alboran coast favors sardine nursery grounds. The Northern Alboran stock had slightly more energy stored in the muscles compared to the other groups studied. Additionally, only the Northern Alboran area saw improvement in body condition from 2010 while other subareas saw a dramatic decline in body condition and maximum size between 1975 and 2015. The authors speculate there is possible overlap between the Atlantic and Alboran individuals which causes genetic variability and plasticity. Moreover, this area is more favorable to those with an affinity for cool temperatures with less seasonal variation. The authors urge for close monitoring of the Northern Spain sardine population due to rapid environmental change vulnerability and heavy fishing pressures.

In a more recent study, analysis of the genome of the European sardine S. pilchardus and mitochondrial data revealed evidence of at least three genetic clusters within the natural range (Eastern Mediterranean to the Azores archipelago). However, more research will be needed to more firmly establish these findings.

== See also ==
- History of the pilchard fishery
- Sardines as food
