= Xouba =

Type of small sardine

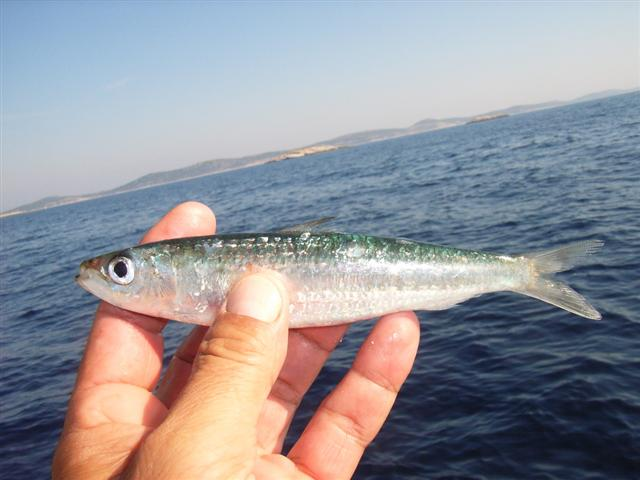
Xouba (Sardina pilchardus)

The xouba, parrocha, or little sardine is a small or juvenile European pilchard (Sardina pilchardus) caught off the coast of Galicia, Spain. Like all European pilchards, xoubas are pelagic ray-finned fish in the monotypic genus Sardina in the family Clupeidae.

== Description ==
The fish is blue-green and has a silver underside. In comparison to other sardines, xouba are caught at a smaller size. Xouba generally live in shallow areas of water between 5 m (16 ft) and 50 m (160 ft). The fish is harvested between the months of May and July when it reaches 13 cm (5.1 in) in length. In some areas xouba are instead called parrocha.

Xoubas have a tender distinct flavor and they nutrient-dense. They have a high omega-3 fatty acid content and are high in healthy fats. Xoubas have more fat than other sardines.

== History ==
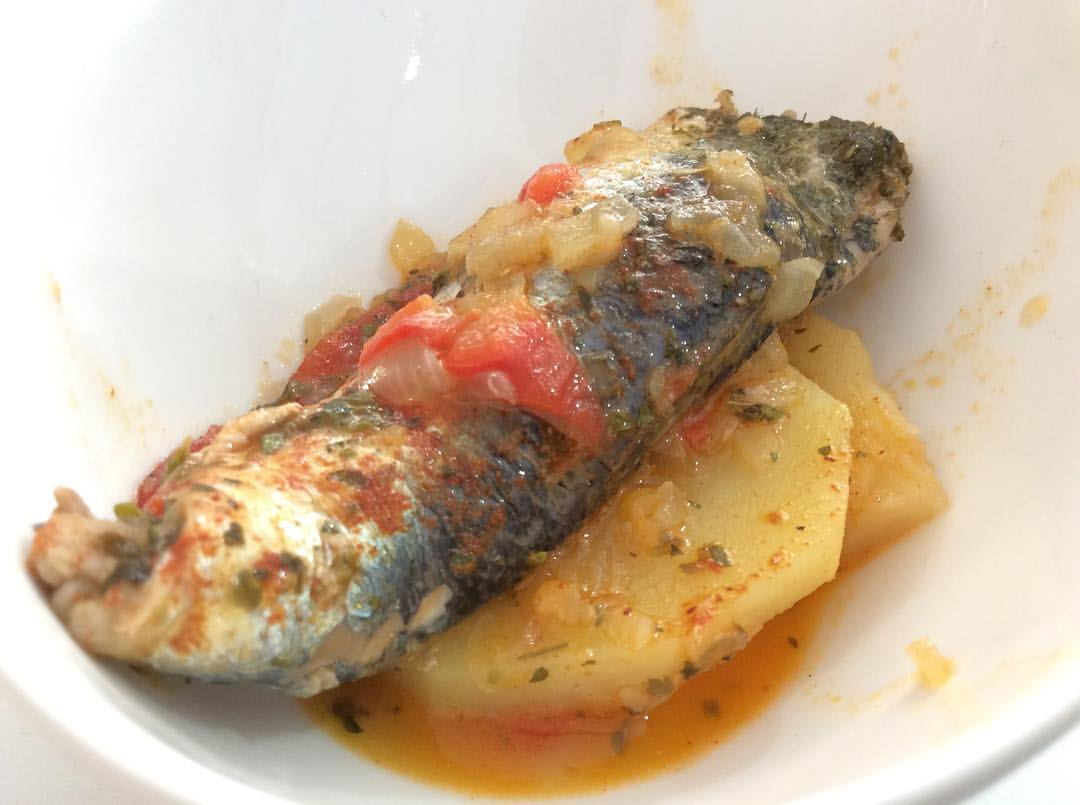
Guiso de xoubas: served with a tomato base over sliced potatoes

Since the 15th century, xouba is caught with a technique called xeito. The technique employs a net stretched between boats; a type of drift netting. In Spain there are several annual events to celebrate the xouba. One such event is the Burial of the xoubiña. It is celebrated on Ash Wednesday and it includes funeral procession that is satirical. The procession ends with the burning of the effigy of a sardine. Galicia, Spain is the home of a festival (Festa da Xouba) celebrating the xouba. The event takes place about the same time as the "Feast of Saint James" which happens in July.

=== Preparation ===
Prepared as a dish, it can be used in empanadas, or pickled, or made in a casserole with potatoes. Xouba is also grilled and served on bread, or breaded with chickpea flour and fried.

== Gallery ==
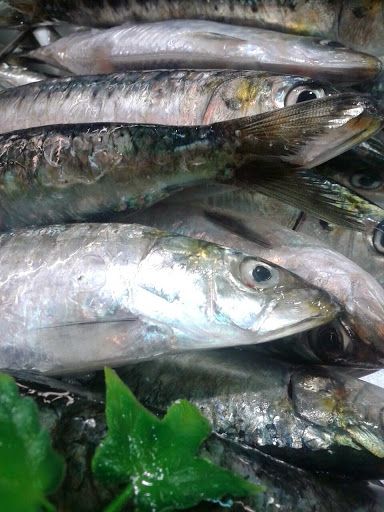
Xouba

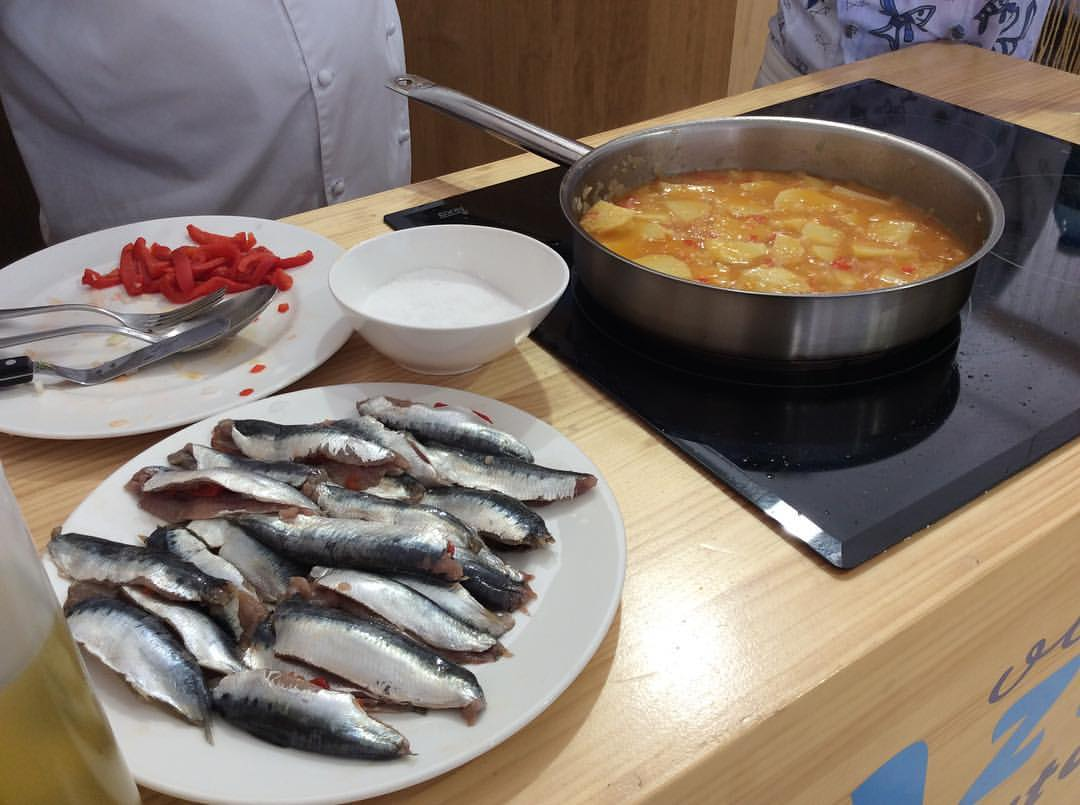
Guiso de xoubas

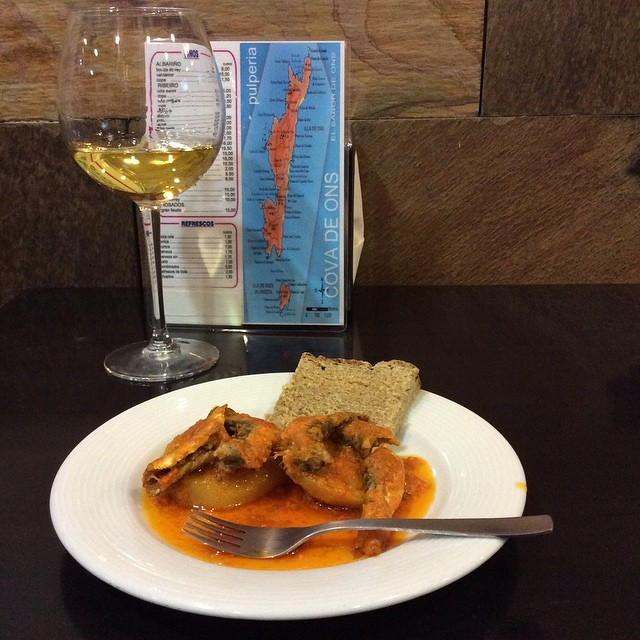
Prepared Xouba with bread
