= A Procession of Flagellants =

Painting by Francisco de Goya

- Procesión de disciplinantes (Spanish)
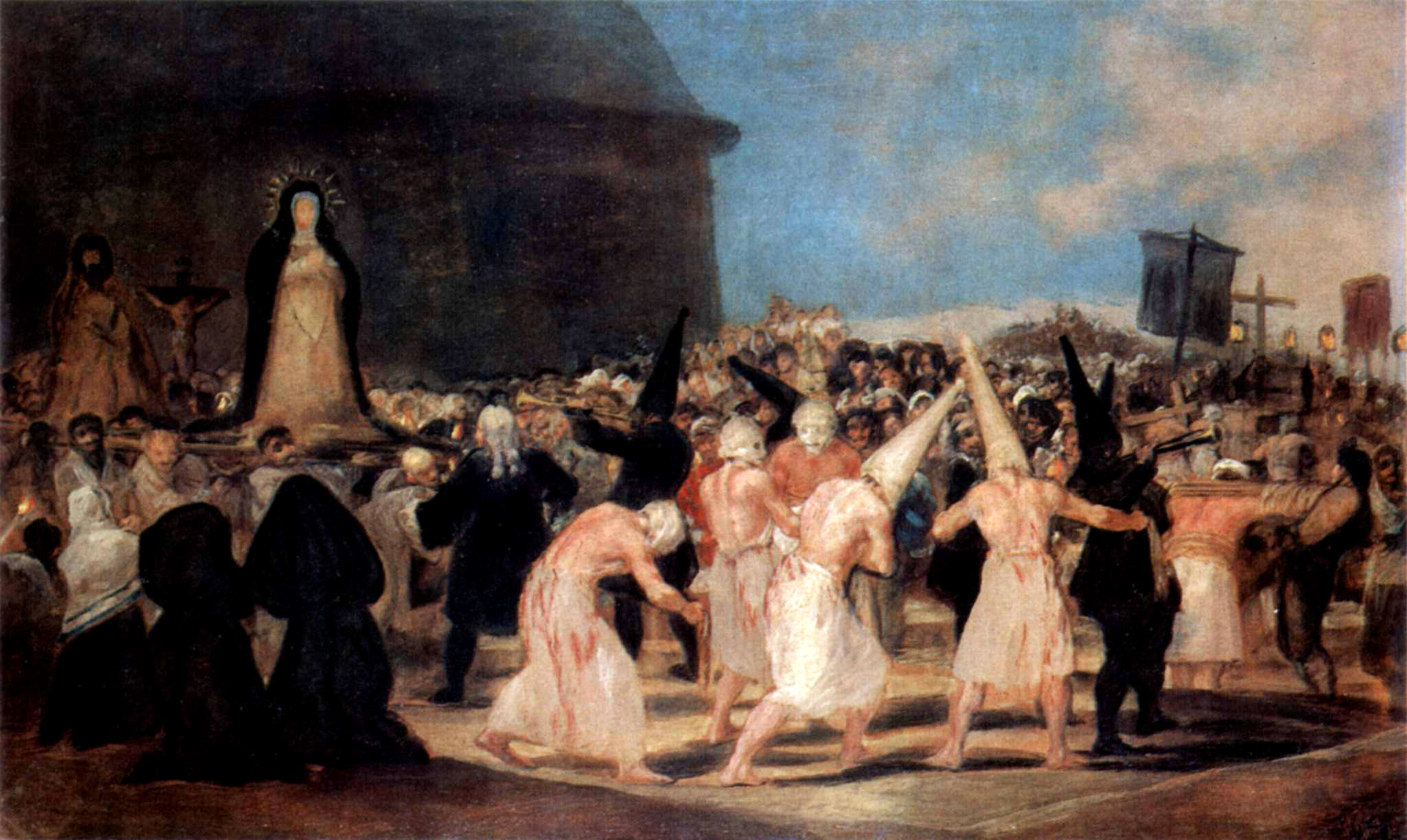
- Artist: Francisco de Goya
- Year: 1814-1816
- Medium: Oil on panel
- Dimensions: 46 cm × 73 cm (18 in × 29 in)
- Location: Real Academia de Bellas Artes de San Fernando, Madrid

A Procession of Flagellants (Procesión de disciplinantes, or Procesión de flagelantes) is an oil-on-panel painting produced by Francisco de Goya between 1814 and 1816. In the foreground is a procession of Roman Catholic men dressed in white, wearing capirotes and whipping their bared backs in penitence. Their backs are bleeding and they pull over-life-size statues of Nuestra Señora de la Soledad, the Ecce Homo and the Crucifixion of Christ. Other devotees, who are kneeling and wearing black hoods, line the route. On the right a man is impaled and all are carrying banners, crosses and lamps.

The painting belongs to a series which also includes The Inquisition Tribunal, The Madhouse and The Bullfight. This series illustrates aspects of Spanish life which liberals (of whom Goya was then one) wished to reform but whose reform was opposed by Ferdinand VII of Spain's absolutist policy. A common feature of the series is the presence of cruelty, here shown by the blood flowing out onto the white garment of the central figure, and two contrasting zones of light and dark – here, all the figures in the foreground are in the light, well-characterised and individualised, but the background is left as an anonymous crowd of the faithful, dimly lit under a cloudy blue sky. The two zones are divided by a dark wall, possibly symbolising the heavy weight of religion.

The series played an important part in creating the legend of 'Black Spain'. It does not go beyond the usual point of view on the Spanish mindset of its era among most other Europeans, interested in Spain as an exotic and picturesque land, an interest first aroused by the French contact with Spain that led to the Peninsular War. Paintings such as these, with a terrible and romantic aura, inspired several later prints.

== See also ==
- List of works by Francisco Goya
