= The Inquisition Tribunal =

1819 painting by Francisco Goya

- Auto de fe de la Inquisición (Spanish)
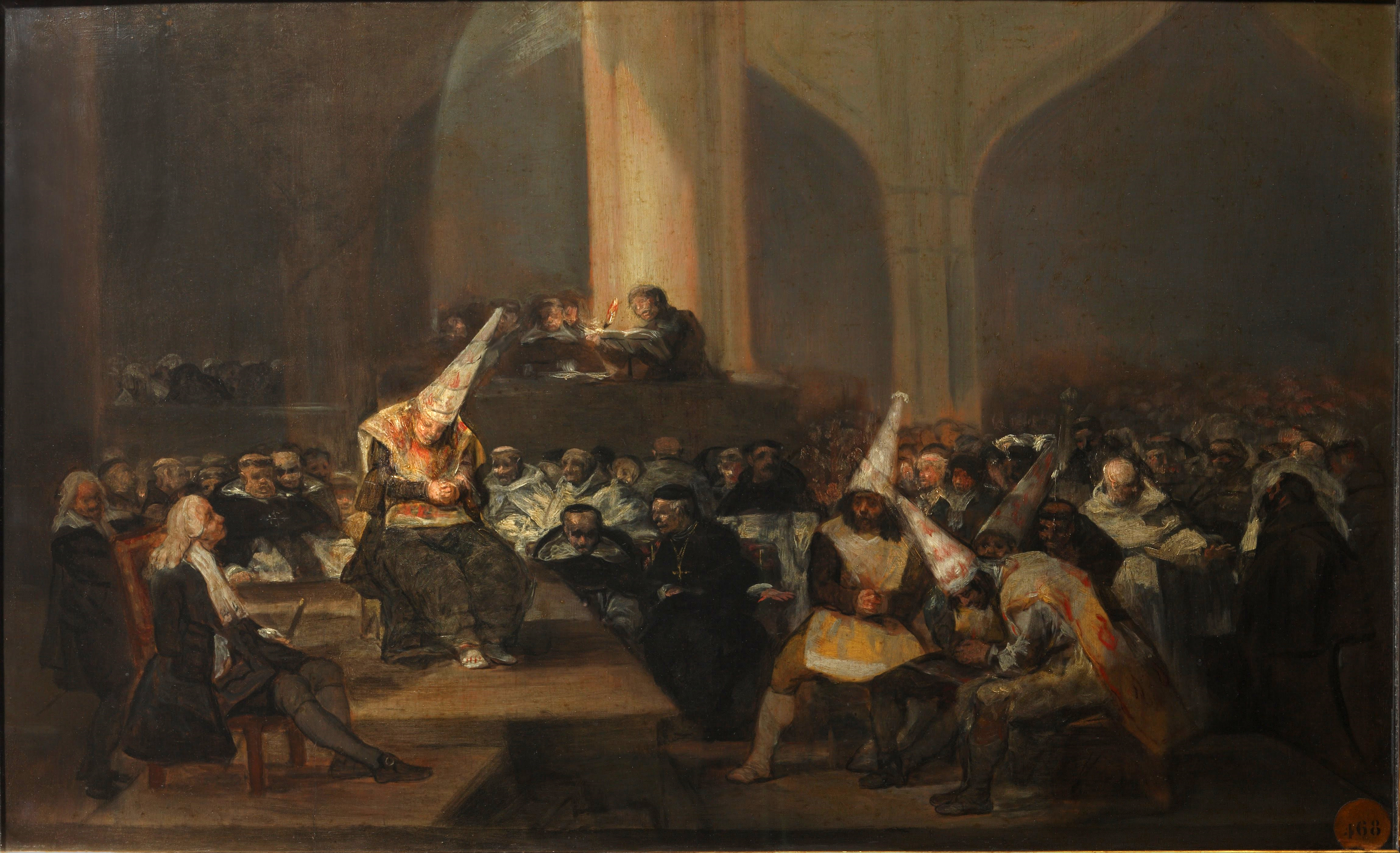
- Artist: Francisco Goya
- Year: 1812–1819
- Medium: Oil on panel
- Dimensions: 46 cm × 73 cm (18 in × 29 in)
- Location: Real Academia de Bellas Artes de San Fernando, Madrid

The Inquisition Tribunal, also known as The Court of the Inquisition or The Inquisition Scene (Spanish: Escena de Inquisición), is a 46-by-73-centimetre (18 by 29 in) oil-on-panel painting produced by the Spanish artist Francisco Goya between 1812 and 1819. The painting belongs to a series which also includes Bullfight, The Madhouse and A Procession of Flagellants, all reflecting customs which liberals (of whom Goya was then one) objected to and wished were abandoned, but their reform was opposed by the absolutist (autocratic) policy of Ferdinand VII of Spain.

The work was owned by Manuel García de la Prada and is now in the collection of the Real Academia de Bellas Artes de San Fernando in Madrid.

== Description ==
The painting depicts an auto-da-fé (from Portuguese, meaning "act of faith") by a tribunal of the Spanish Inquisition, being held inside a church. The officials in the scene are predominantly monks with only a single secular judge present. The four accused people are wearing tall, pointed coroza or capirote (a white pointed hat) on their heads and clad in sanbenitos describing their offences. Ringed around the accused are the clerics and Inquisitors and farther back a sea of invited guests fill the church interior, witnessing the drama. Every figure in the foreground is in the light, individualised and well-characterised, whereas the background is occupied by an anonymous mass of people shut in by darkness and a claustrophobic Gothic architecture.

== Background ==
Born in 1746, Goya moved from his home town Zaragoza to Madrid in 1775. He became a cartoon painter in the Royal Tapestry Factory and his work was brought to the attention of the Spanish royalty. He was appointed court painter in 1789. Long before he painted The Inquisition Tribunal, in 1783, he made a portrait of Don Manuel Osorio Manrique de Zúñiga aged six, who later became a cardinal at the age of twenty-three and ended the notorious Spanish Inquisition. By the time period in which this painting was most likely completed, Goya was long finished with painting sunny pictures in the rococo style. He had suffered a grave illness in 1792 that left him permanently deaf. This crisis marked a turning point in his work; instead of light-hearted decorations he painted strong essays on the turmoil and raw emotion of man’s inhumanity to man. The Inquisition Tribunal is one of a series of paintings marked by an instance of cruelty—here in the Inquisition Tribunal, the threat of being burned at the stake, symbolised by the pointed hats worn by the accused. A Procession of Flagellants, another one of Goya's works in this series, shows the presence of cruelty and the use of symbolism, where blood is seen flowing out onto the white garment of figures. Its size is 46 cm x 73 cm (18 inches x 29 inches). It is an oil on panel.

The Spanish Inquisition was established in 1478 to keep Catholic orthodoxy. The first auto-da-fé took place in Seville in 1481, when six conversos (Jews forcibly converted to Christianity) were burnt at the stake. In Goya's lifetime he would have been quite aware of the history and strong influence that the church held on Spanish society. Though the Inquisition was winding down it was not until 1834 that it was officially ended. Goya sketched, painted and printed many scenes showing the barbarity and cruelty of the Spanish Inquisition and of the turbulent, warring times in which he lived.

Goya was twice summoned by the Inquisition. The first time was in regard to his series of prints Los Caprichos, published in 1799. He was called by the Inquisition again in 1815, after ecclesiastical authorities discovered his paintings The Naked Maja and The Clothed Maja among the seized property of Manuel Godoy. In both instances he escaped serious punishment.

== The auto-da-fé ==
The auto-da-fé, like the one shown in the Inquisition Tribunal, was used to publicly shame and break an accused heretic. The victim had often been tortured beforehand until they confessed to the crimes of which they had been accused. The accuser(s) and witnesses against the "heretic" were kept secret from the accused until the public shaming.

The attire that the accused was forced to wear during the auto da fé more often than not signified the crime and punishment. The victim was made to wear a coroza, a tall conical hat. If a victim was to be burnt at the stake, the sleeveless vest known as sanbenito had flames emblazoned on it against a black background. Often these garments also noted the victim’s name, social status, supposed crime against the Church, and the date of conviction.

== See also ==
- List of works by Francisco Goya
