= Bullfight (Goya) =

Painting by Francisco de Goya

Bullfight, Suerte de Varas
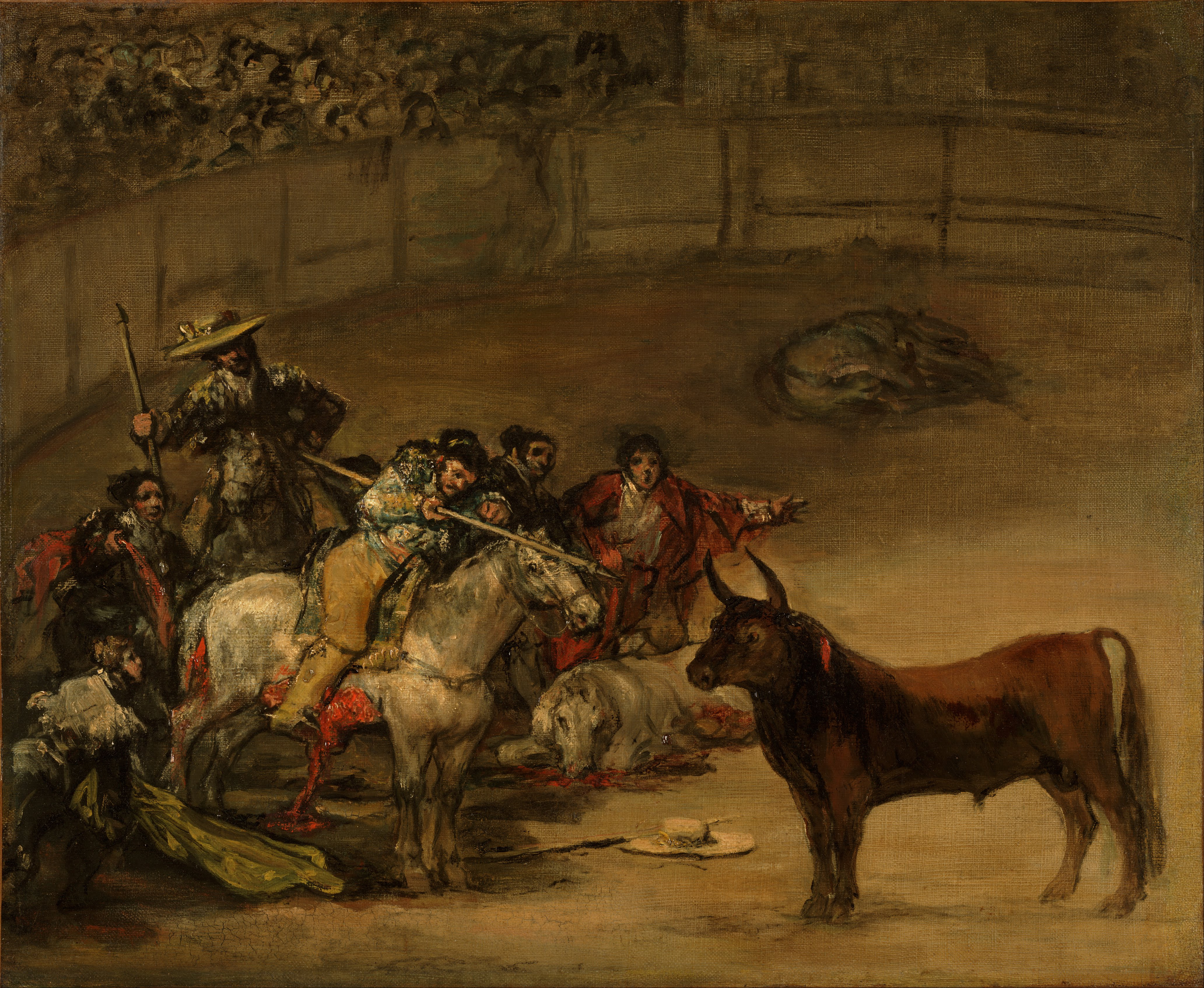
- Year: 1824
- Medium: oil paint, canvas
- Dimensions: 495 mm (19.5 in) × 610 mm (24 in)
- Location: Getty Center
- Collection: J. Paul Getty Museum
- Accession no.: 93.PA.1

Bullfight (Spanish: Suerte de Varas) is an 1824 oil painting by Francisco Goya owned since 1992 by the J. Paul Getty Museum. When the museum bought the painting at auction in 1992, it shattered the artist's previous auction record. This piece shows Goya’s favorite form of entertainment: the controversial contest of bullfighting.

== Background ==
During Goya’s lifetime, bullfighting was not always welcomed in popular Spanish culture. There were several harsh critics of bullfighting particularly during the Spanish Enlightenment, but none was more prominent than Vargas Ponce, the director of the Royal Academy of History in Spain. However, the king ultimately decided what role bullfighting would play in Spanish culture. King Charles III banned the fighting and killing of bulls in 1785, and the practice was fully banned by his successor King Charles IV in 1805. After the rise of Joseph Bonaparte and the return to Spanish rule under Ferdinand VII in 1814, bullfighting was “fully reinstated, and it underwent a renewed wave of popularity during the following years”. After the bullfighting was legalized, Goya released his La Tauromaquia in 1816.

In 1824, Francisco Goya was exiled from Spain to Bordeaux, France where he lived for 4 years before his death in 1828. There, Goya asked his friend Joaquin Maria Ferrer for his thoughts on the appeal of bullfighting prints in France. Goya was disappointed when Ferrer was “evidently discouraging about Parisian interest in such prints.” Goya would go on to produce Suerte de Vargas and would gift it to Ferrer in July 1824. It is thought to be Ferrer who wrote on the back of the painting: “Pintado en Paris en Julio de 1824. Por Dn. Franco. Goya. JMF.”

== Technique ==
Goya believed that there were no rules to painting and therefore he would create in whatever way he pleased. In Suerte de Vara Goya uses contrast to depict the spectacle of bullfighting. Goya used a black preparation that shows through in the distance. The picadors are dressed in dark colors but stand out against the light sand. The horse that the picador with the spear rides is very light and contrasts against the bull. The bull itself seems the most poised creature in the entire work. While the picadors look frantic, the bull stands proudly and still, as if the crowd is there to admire it. The picadors and the bull are generally the first objects observed as they stand out against the distant spectators, who are not clearly depicted, watching over the wooden fence. Goya used a very thick impasto for the main attractions of the painting: the picadors and the bull.

== Significance ==
While not much is known about Suerte de Varas, there have been prominent art historians that have expressed their views on why Goya created this piece and what significance it has not just for the viewer, but Goya himself.

Corry Cropper's book Playing at Monarchy: Sport as Metaphor in Nineteenth-century France suggests that Goya is drawn to “the tension of high drama.” This would be fitting with many of Goya’s other works as in his Los Desastres de la Guerra (The Disasters of War) series almost all of the etchings depict scenes of high tension and drama. These etchings created between 1810 and 1815, a decade before Suerte de Varas, suggest that Goya always had an interest in the dramatic. Professor Cropper goes a step further when analyzing Goya’s interest in tension and the sport with the most tension: bullfighting.

Cropper goes on to argue that Goya’s obsession with bullfighting is really meant to be seen as a metaphor for the political stage of his homeland Spain at the time. He writes that Goya “capitalizes on bullfighting as a symbol of resistance to the dominant order, of a popular Spain battling tyrannical control.” During this time there was significant political turmoil in Spain as after Charles IV died in July 1808, Napoleon Bonaparte tried to name his brother Joseph King of Spain. This led to the Spanish War for Independence, also known as the Peninsular War and eventually ended with the return of Spain to Spanish rule under Ferdinand VII. It was during this time period that Goya produced many of his bullfighting works. Cropper is supported by Francois Zumbiehl who writes, “Goya’s fascination for bullfighting at the time of the Revolution allows him to forcefully depict popular exuberance through it.” It is the deeper meaning behind Suerte de Varas that has left viewers marveling at the impressive piece.

== See also ==
- List of works by Francisco Goya
