= Female figure (disambiguation) =

Female figure is the cumulative product of a woman's skeletal structure and the quantity and distribution of muscle and fat on the body.

Female figure may also refer to:

- Female Figure (Giambologna), a marble statue
- Female Figure (Velázquez), an oil-on-canvas painting
- Female Figure (Wolfson), an animatronic sculpture
