= Meadows Museum of Art =

- Location within Louisiana
- Established: 1975
- Location: Shreveport, Louisiana, United States
- Coordinates: 32.48361°N 93.73358°W
- Type: Art museum
- Accreditation: American Alliance of Museums
- Key holdings: Albrecht Dürer's Triumphal Arch
- Collections: French Indochina art, Inuit art
- Collection size: Roughly 1,600+
- Founder: Algur H. Meadows
- Website: www.centenary.edu/meadows

The Meadows Museum of Art at Centenary College of Louisiana in Shreveport is charged with the collection, conservation, preservation and interpretation of visual art works of museum quality. It is also a vital resource for students studying art history, studio art, and museum management, who frequently serve as interns, docents, and guest curators. The Meadows Museum of Art is the second art museum resulting from the philanthropy of oilman Algur H. Meadows. The first is the Meadows Museum at Southern Methodist University.

== History ==
The Meadows Museum of Art was established at Centenary College of Louisiana in 1975 on the occasion of the College's 150th anniversary. The museum was made possible by a gift from Algur H. Meadows, a Centenary alumnus. In 1969, Meadows purchased 360 pieces of original artwork from the family of the recently deceased French artist Jean Despujols for $250,000, and gave them to Centenary College for the purpose of establishing a second Meadows Museum, just four years after SMU's Meadows was opened. Meadows also gifted $200,000 to the college to remodel the 1926 Arts Building designed by Shreveport architect Edward F. Neild, into a 4000 square-foot art museum. The Arts Building has served several purposes since its construction, including: college classrooms, the library, an administration building, and today the Meadows Museum of Art. Meadows later gave an additional $150,000 to be used for museum maintenance.

Unlike SMU's Meadows, which received Mr. Meadows' large Spanish art collection, Centenary's Meadows Museum began with the Indochina Collection of paintings and drawings by French Academic artist Jean Despujols, documenting his time working in Indochina for the French government between 1936 and 1938. Despujols had previously served as an art professor at Fontainebleau Academy in France in the early 20th century. His Indochina Collection is notable because Despujols' realist style accurately records the various peoples, cultures, landscapes, and religious practices present in an area now including Vietnam, Cambodia, and Laos, an area that would soon be permanently altered by wars and genocide. Before arriving in Shreveport, the Collection was exhibited in Hanoi and Saigon in 1938, at the Smithsonian Museum in 1950, and the M.H. de Young Memorial Museum in 1952. This Collection marks one of the largest collections of French colonial art in existence. In 1951, National Geographic Magazine included twenty-one paintings from the Collection in their article "Portrait of Indochina." Despujols immigrated to the United States during World War II, and lived in Shreveport, Louisiana until his death.

Willard Cooper, a 1947 Centenary graduate, returned to the college to serve as the first art director of the museum. He also served as an art professor and chairman of the art department at Centenary.

== The Meadows today ==
Since its opening, the Museum's permanent holdings have grown to around 1600 works. The Museum expanded its Indochina Collection to include the traditional Southeast Asian costumes depicted in Despujols' paintings. In addition to the Indochina Collection, works by George Grosz, Emilio Amero, Mary Cassatt, William Hogarth, and Alfred Maurer, among others, and Louisiana artists including Clyde Connell, Clementine Hunter, and Don Brown are housed in its permanent collection. Additionally, the Meadows Museum of Art owns one of the surviving copies of The Triumphal Arch of Maximilian I by Northern Renaissance artist and engraver Albrecht Dürer, and a substantial collection of Inuit prints and sculptures.

In addition to its mission to collect and preserve important art, the Meadows Museum of Art hosts temporary exhibitions and educational programs that aim to introduce the public to diverse art forms and noteworthy artists, art historians, and curators from outside the region. Recent exhibitions include Sean Starwars, Renegade Printmaker of the South, Mali De-Kalo's Relaying--Testimonies of Motherhood Lost, Poet of the Ordinary: Photographs by Keith Carter, The Dream Series by Marlene Tseng Yu, and Images of Excellence: The O. Winston Link Centennial. To support its educational mission, the Museum never charges admission. Serving as an artistic attraction for the larger Shreveport community, The Meadows Museum of Art also plays an essential role in enriching the academic mission of the campus.

Centenary's Meadows Museum is accredited by the American Alliance of Museums (AAM), the highest national recognition afforded the nation's museums. Accreditation signifies excellence to the museum community, governments, funders, outside agencies, and the museum-going public. The Meadows was initially accredited in 1980 and has been re-accredited four times, equating to 50 years of museum excellence.
