= Yard with Lunatics =

Painting by Goya

- Corral de locos (Spanish)
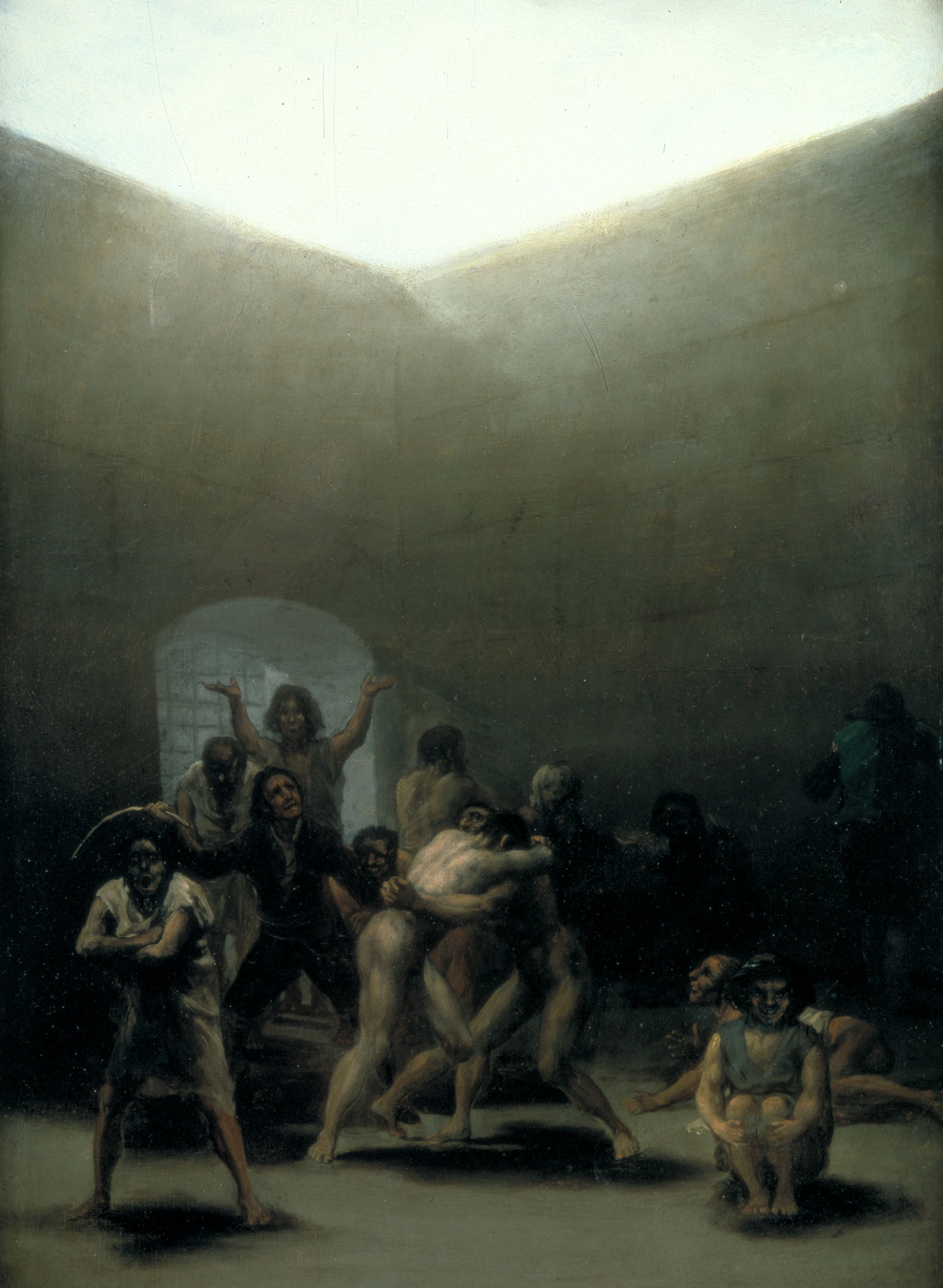
- Artist: Francisco Goya
- Year: c. 1794
- Type: oil-on-tinplate
- Dimensions: 32.7 cm × 43.8 cm (12.9 in × 17.2 in)
- Location: Meadows Museum; Dallas

Yard with Lunatics (Spanish: Corral de locos) is a small oil-on-tinplate painting completed by the Spanish artist Francisco Goya between 1793 and 1794. Goya said that the painting was informed by scenes of institutions he had witnessed as a youth in Zaragoza.

It was painted around the time when Goya’s deafness and mental illness were developing, and he was increasingly complaining about his health. A contemporary diagnosis read, "the noises in his head and deafness aren’t improving, yet his vision is much better and he is back in control of his balance."

== Background ==
Though Goya had to that point been preoccupied with commissioned portraits of royalty and noblemen, this work is one of a dozen small-scale, dark images he produced independently. Uncommissioned, it was one of the first of Goya's mid-1790s cabinet paintings, in which his earlier search for ideal beauty gave way to an examination of the relationship between naturalism and fantasy that would preoccupy him for the rest of his career. He was undergoing a nervous breakdown and entering prolonged physical illness, and admitted that the series was created to reflect his own self-doubt, anxiety and fear that he himself was going mad. Goya wrote that the works served "to occupy my imagination, tormented as it is by contemplation of my sufferings." The series, he said, consisted of pictures which "normally find no place in commissioned works."

To art historian Arthur Danto, Yard with Lunatics marks a point in Goya's career where he moves from "a world in which there are no shadows to one in which there is no light". The work is often compared to more mature but equally bleak Madhouse of 1812–19. It has been described as a "somber vision of human bodies without human reason", as one of Goya's "deeply disturbing visions of sadism and suffering", and a work that marks his progression from a commissioned portraitist to an artist who pursued only his bleak and pitiless view of humanity.

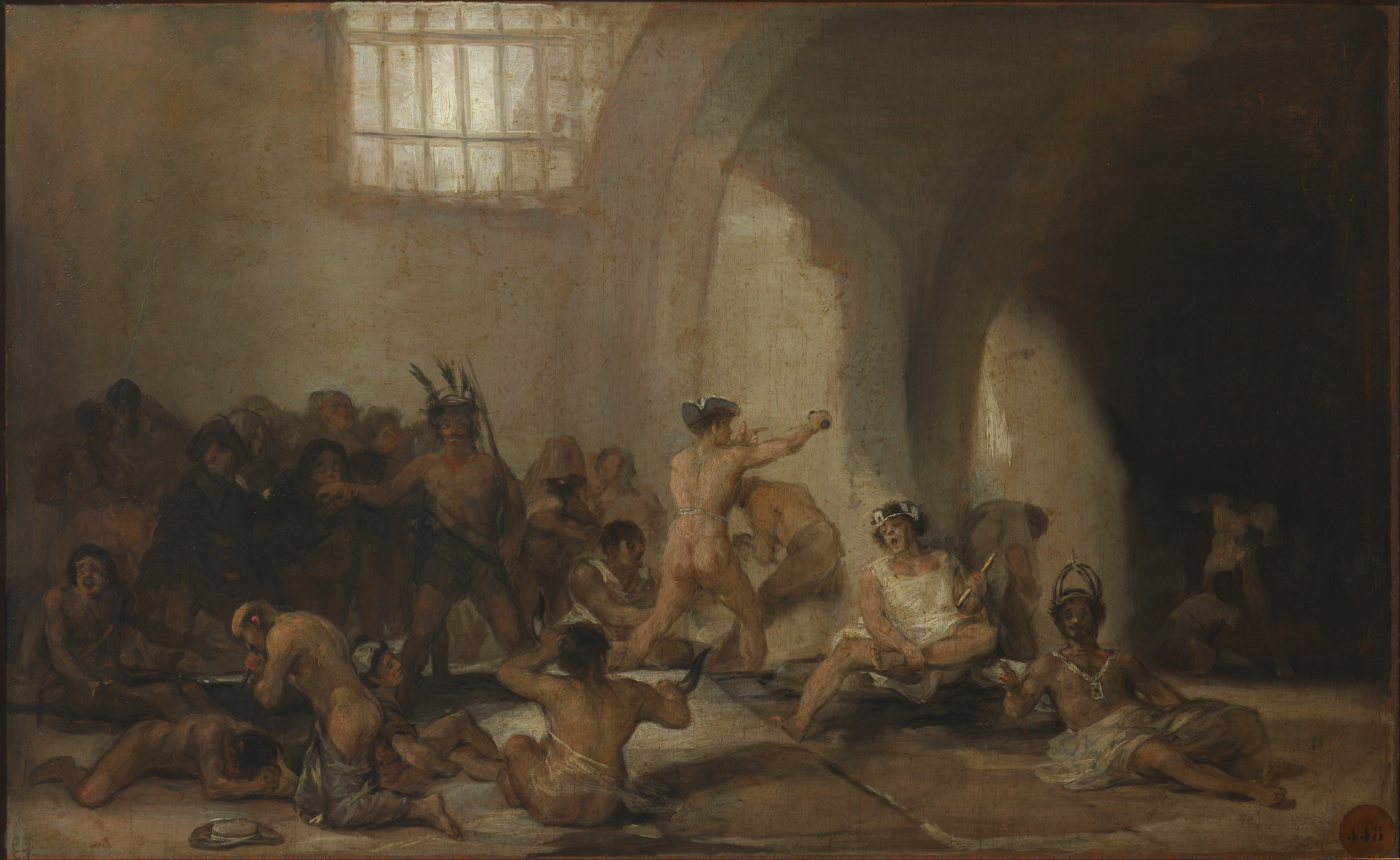
Goya's The Madhouse, 1812–19. Real Academia de Bellas Artes de San Fernando, Madrid.

Some historians speculate that Goya's symptoms may indicate prolonged viral encephalitis, and the mixture of tinnitus, imbalance and progressive deafness may be symptoms of Ménière's disease. Others claim that he was suffering from mental illness. However, these attempts at posthumous diagnosis are purely, and only, speculative and hypothetical. Goya's diagnosis remains unknown. What is known is that he lived in fear of insanity and projected his fears and despair into his work.

Set in a lunatic asylum, Yard with Lunatics was painted at a time when such institutions were, according to art critic Robert Hughes, no more than "holes in the social surface, small dumps into which the psychotic could be thrown without the smallest attempt to discover, classify, or treat the nature of their illness." Goya's yard is overwhelmingly stark, showing shackled inmates enclosed by high walls and a heavy stone arch. Inmates fight and grin idiotically or huddle in despair, all bathed in an oppressive grey and green light, guarded by a single man. The work stands as a horrifying and imaginary vision of loneliness, fear and social alienation, a departure from the rather more superficial treatment of mental illness in the works of earlier artists such as Hogarth. John J. Ciofalo writes that "there is a virtual vacuum of unreason inhabited and realized by those confined, and most especially by the warden himself."

In a 1794 letter to his friend Bernardo de Yriarte, he wrote that the painting shows "a yard with lunatics, and two of them fighting completely naked while their warder beats them, and others in sacks; (it is a scene I witnessed at Zaragoza)". It is usually read as an indictment of the widespread punitive treatment of the insane, who were confined with criminals, put in iron manacles, and routinely subjected to physical punishment, in ground sealed by masonry blocks and iron gate. Here the patients are variously staring, sitting, posturing, wrestling, grimacing or disciplining themselves. The top of the canvas vanishes with sunlight, emphasizing the nightmarish scene below. The condemnation of brutality towards prisoners, whether criminal or insane, was a subject of many of Goya's later paintings.

The painting had been absent from public view since a private sale in 1922; today it is housed in the Meadows Museum in Dallas, having been donated by Algur H. Meadows in 1967.

== See also ==
- List of works by Francisco Goya

== Bibliography ==
- Connell, Evan S. Francisco Goya: A Life. New York: Counterpoint, 2004. ISBN 1-58243-307-0
- Hagen, Rose-Marie & Hagen, Rainer. Francisco Goya, 1746-1828. Taschen, 2003. ISBN 3-8228-1823-2
- Hughes, Robert. Goya. New York: Alfred A. Knopf, 2004. ISBN 0-394-58028-1
