= 3rd Louisiana Infantry Regiment =

Infantry regiment of the Confederate States Army

3rd Louisiana Infantry Regiment (Confederate)
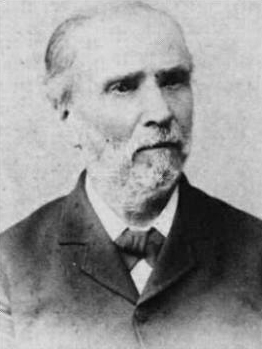
- Louis Hebert was the regiment's first colonel.
- Active: 11 May 1861 – 20 May 1865
- Country: Confederate States
- Allegiance: State of Louisiana
- Branch: Confederate Army
- Type: Infantry
- Size: Regiment
- Nickname: Pelican Rifles
- Engagements: American Civil War; Battle of Wilson's Creek (1861); Battle of Pea Ridge (1862); Siege of Corinth (1862); Battle of Iuka (1862); Battle of Corinth (1862); Siege of Vicksburg (1863)

Commanders
- Notable commanders: Louis Hébert (officer)

The 3rd Louisiana Infantry Regiment was a unit of foot soldiers from Louisiana that fought in the Confederate States Army during the American Civil War. The regiment distinguished itself at Wilson's Creek in 1861. The 3rd Louisiana fought at Pea Ridge, First Corinth, Iuka, and Second Corinth in 1862. The unit defended Vicksburg in 1863 where it was captured. At Vicksburg, the unit's fortification was twice blown up by powerful land mines. The surviving soldiers were paroled and exchanged, after which they performed guard duty for the rest of the war.

== Formation ==
On 11 May 1861, the 3rd Louisiana Infantry Regiment organized at Camp Walker in New Orleans with 1,037 soldiers. The unit's original field officers were Colonel Louis Hébert, Lieutenant Colonel Samuel M. Hyams, and Major William F. Tunnard. On 20 May, the regiment started to travel to Fort Smith, Arkansas. Captains, company nicknames, and parishes where the men were recruited are listed below.

Company information for the 3rd Louisiana Infantry Regiment
| Company | Nickname | Captains | Recruitment Parish |
|---|---|---|---|
| A | Iberville Greys | Charles A. Busle (x); John Kinney (m-Vicksburg); Thomas Gourrier | Iberville |
| B | Morehouse Guards | R. M. Hinson (k-Wilson's Creek); W. T. Hall (r); D. C. Morgan | Morehouse |
| C | Winn Rifles | David Pierson (p); N. M. Middlebrook | Winn |
| D | Pelican Rifles No. 2 | James D. Blair (x); William E. Russell | Natchitoches |
| E | Morehouse Fencibles | James F. Harris (x); Charles H. Brashear (t) | Morehouse |
| F | Shreveport Rangers | Jerome B. Gillmore (p); William Kinney | Caddo |
| G | Pelican Rifles No. 1 | Winter W. Breazeale (r); L. Caspari (x); William B. Butler | Natchitoches |
| H | Monticello Rifles | John S. Richards (p); A. W. Currie | Carroll |
| I | Caldwell Guards | William L. Gunnels (x); Joseph E. Johnson (m-Vicksburg); T. M. Meredith | Caldwell |
| K | Pelican Rifles | John B. Viglini (x); Henry H. Gentles | East Baton Rouge |

- Key: k = killed, m = mortally wounded, p = promoted, r = resigned, t = transferred, x = dropped 8 May 1862.

== History ==
=== 1861 ===
The 3rd Louisiana Infantry served in Benjamin McCulloch's brigade from May–September 1861. When the indifferently-dressed pro-Southern Missourians first saw Hebert's regiment, they were impressed with its neat gray uniforms and the officers' gold braid. On 10 August 1861 in the Battle of Wilson's Creek, 5,400 Union soldiers with 16 guns under Nathaniel Lyon attacked 10,175 Confederate troops with 15 guns led by Sterling Price, Nicholas Bartlett Pearce, and McCulloch. Lyon's attack was a complete surprise. As his main column advanced from the north, Lyon sent 300 U.S. regular infantry under J. B. Plummer to protect his left flank. The 3rd Louisiana and the 2nd Arkansas Mounted Rifles met the regulars in a cornfield and defeated them after a fight lasting one hour. A second Union column led by Franz Sigel advanced from the south and enjoyed a brief success. After its successful cornfield fight, Hebert's Pelican Rifles moved to face the new threat. Sigel's men held their fire because the Louisianans looked like an Iowa regiment. Sigel's troops were routed after being blasted by a volley. Finally, the 3rd Louisiana joined the main battle against Lyon on Oak Hill, taking a position on the right flank next to the 3rd Texas Cavalry Regiment. After repelling four Confederate attacks, Lyon was killed and the Federals retreated after suffering 1,317 casualties. Confederate losses numbered 1,230. The 3rd Louisiana lost 9 killed and 48 wounded at Wilson's Creek, including Captain Hinson (B Company) killed.

=== 1862 ===
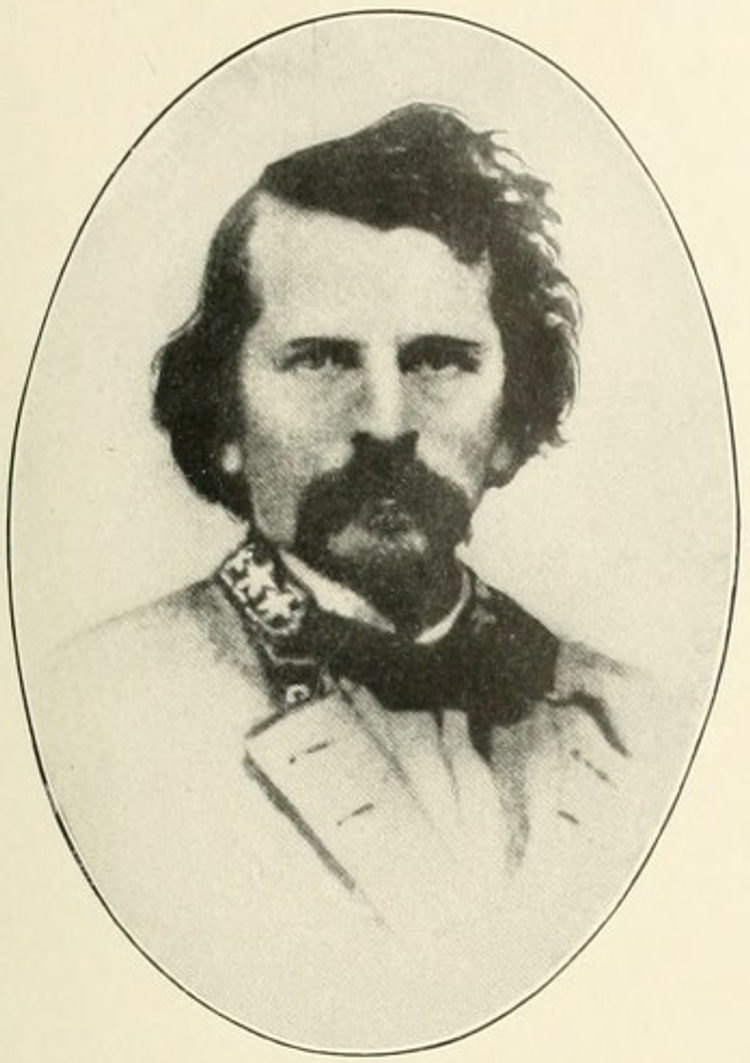
General Earl Van Dorn

In the Battle of Pea Ridge on 7–8 March 1862, the 3rd Louisiana was commanded by Major Tunnard since Colonel Hebert was promoted to brigade commander. The regiment sustained casualties of 10 killed, 15 wounded, and 42 missing during the fighting. On 7 March, McCulloch was killed early in the fighting and the division's second-in-command James M. McIntosh was shot dead soon afterward. At about the same time, Hebert (who was third-in-command) led the 3rd Louisiana and the 4th, 14th, and 15th Arkansas infantry regiments into Morgan's Woods. When the staff officers of the fallen generals went looking for Hebert, he had disappeared into the woods, leaving McCulloch's division leaderless. After extremely confused fighting, Hebert's regiments were defeated and withdrew from the woods. Hebert and about 30 others became separated from his brigade and the group was later captured by Union cavalry. Tunnard, who had passed out from exhaustion, was also captured. McCulloch's division dispersed; about 1,200 soldiers left the battlefield, 2,000 went with Albert Pike to join Earl Van Dorn, and another 3,500, including the survivors of the 3rd Louisiana, went with Elkanah Greer to join Van Dorn. On 15 March, Hebert and Tunnard were released from captivity in exchange for two captured Federal officers, Francis J. Herron and William P. Chandler. After Pea Ridge, the Confederate soldiers endured a terrible retreat in cold weather. Because Van Dorn's logistics broke down, they were forced to steal food from the local people. William Watson of the 3rd Louisiana called it a "miniature Moscow retreat". Two weeks after the battle, Tunnard reported that there were only 270 demoralized men in the regiment and that their uniforms were in tatters. Many more drifted in afterward.

Van Dorn soon received an order to move his army to the east side of the Mississippi River. Accordingly, the Confederates marched from Van Buren to Des Arc, Arkansas where the troops boarded vessels that took them to Memphis, Tennessee. The soldiers in Hebert's brigade did not arrive in Des Arc until 15 April 1862 and did not board the transports until 24–25 April. Corinth, Mississippi proved to be an unhealthy camp. Of the 80,000 Confederate troops concentrated there, 18,000 were ill. On 29 May, the Confederate army abandoned Corinth. On 8 May 1862, Hebert, Hyams, Tunnard, and 6 captains were dropped and new officers were elected. Frank Crawford Armstrong became colonel, Jerome B. Gilmore became lieutenant colonel, and Samuel D. Russell became major.

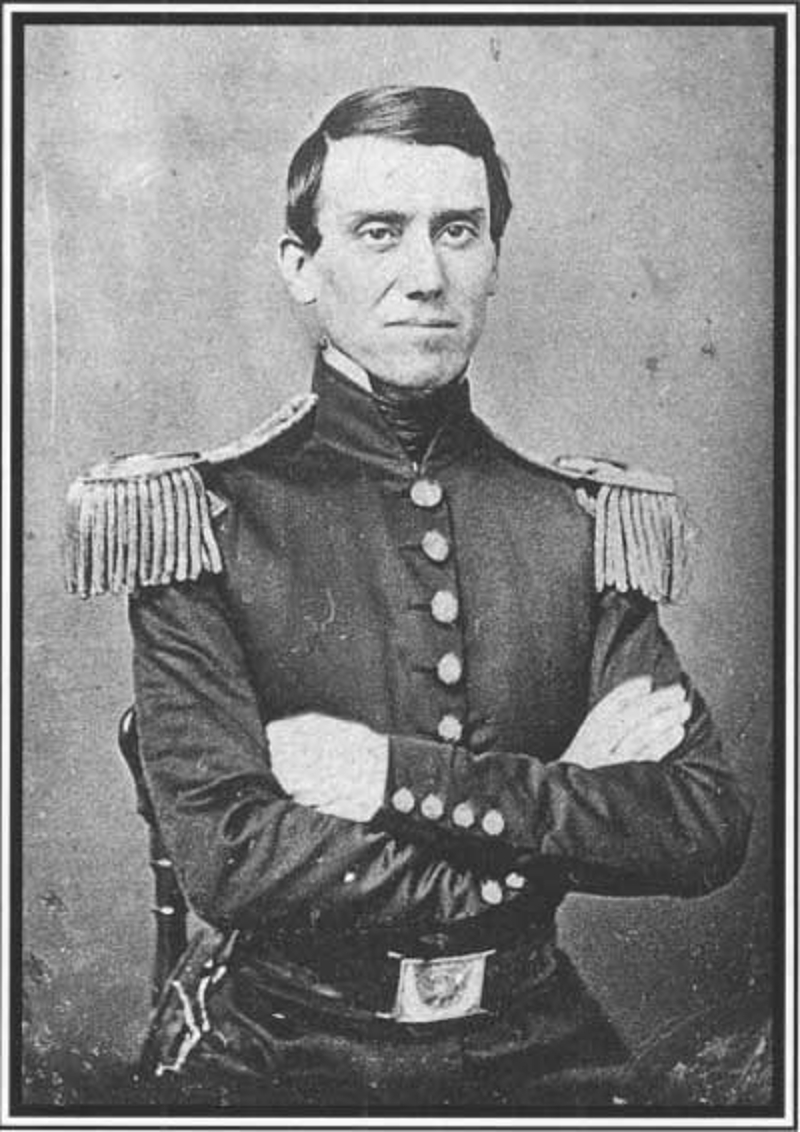
General Lewis H. Little was killed at Iuka.

On 18 September 1862, Armstrong's cavalry galloped into Iuka, Mississippi followed immediately by the 3rd Louisiana Infantry. The town had been hastily abandoned by its Federal garrison and many supplies left behind. The Louisiana soldiers quickly broke into the sutler stores and helped themselves to a variety of food, which was much better than their usual diet of beef and hoecake. In the Battle of Iuka on 19 September, the 3rd Louisiana fought in Hebert's brigade, Lewis Henry Little's division, Price's corps. Hebert arranged his 1,774-man brigade with the 3rd Texas Cavalry (dismounted) deployed in front as skirmishers, the 1st Texas Legion (dismounted) on the right, the combined 14th-17th Arkansas Infantry Regiments in the center, the 3rd Louisiana Infantry on the left, and the 40th Mississippi Infantry in reserve. They were supported by Faris's and Dawson's Missouri batteries. The 3rd Louisiana sent Company F forward as skirmishers and they killed 4 or 5 Union soldiers. At 5:15 pm, Hebert ordered his brigade to attack the Union troops in front.

The Louisianans found themselves fighting the 5th Iowa Volunteer Infantry Regiment at a range of 50 yd (46 m). Sergeant Willie Tunnard remarked that most of the 3rd Louisiana dropped to one knee to fire and avoided injury because the Federals fired too high. After trading volleys for 15 minutes, the Union troops advanced with bayonets and the 3rd Louisiana fell back. Soon the Louisiana soldiers pushed forward again to be pressed back by a second bayonet charge. As darkness fell and smoke obscured the field, the situation became confused. One Louisianan tried to seize the flag of the 5th Iowa, yelling, "Don't fire at us; we are your friends." The Iowans shot him down. Finally, the 5th Iowa started taking fire from the 1st Texas Legion and its three left flank companies were mauled. Four companies from the 26th Missouri Volunteer Infantry tried to fill the gap but were driven back by the 3rd Louisiana. When Hebert sent the 40th Mississippi to attack the Federal right flank, the 5th Iowa retreated, having suffered 217 casualties in 75 minutes of battle. The four companies of the 26th Missouri sustained 97 casualties. Later, when a Federal attack threatened to overrun the regiment, Lieutenant Colonel Gilmore led a charge that drove them back. Earlier, Gilmore had taken five flesh wounds, but he finally took a bullet in the shoulder. Meanwhile, Major Russell rode to the rear to stop friendly fire from hitting the Louisianans in the back. Out of 264 men taken into battle, the 3rd Louisiana lost about 40% casualties.

At the Second Battle of Corinth on 3–4 October 1862, the 3rd Louisiana Infantry was in W. Bruce Colbert's brigade, Hebert's division, Price's corps. The brigade had the same units as at Iuka. On 3 October, Colbert's brigade started the day in reserve behind Hebert's three frontline brigades and apparently ended the day in reserve. On 4 October, Van Dorn ordered Hebert's division to attack at dawn. At 7:00 am, Hebert reported himself ill at headquarters and was replaced by Martin E. Green who was not briefed beforehand. In the muddle, Green's troops finally attacked at 10:00 am. Green's two right-hand brigades smashed through the Union defenses and took Battery Powell, but suffered heavy losses. The two left-hand brigades, including Colbert's, ran into tougher opposition. The 3rd Louisiana fought against the same Federal unit that it fought at Iuka (5th Iowa). After 45 minutes of fighting, Colbert's soldiers were repulsed with severe losses. The 3rd Louisiana suffered 32 casualties, or about one-third of the soldiers who went into battle. Armstrong was tapped to command a new cavalry brigade and resigned on 5 November 1862. On that date, Gilmore became colonel, Russell moved up to lieutenant colonel, and David Pierson became major.

=== 1863–1865 ===
In the Siege of Vicksburg, 18 May – 4 July 1863, the 3rd Louisiana Infantry commanded by Lieutenant Colonel Russell and seconded by Major Pierson was in Hebert's brigade of John Horace Forney's division. During the siege, the brigade suffered losses of 219 killed, 455 wounded, and 21 missing. The 3rd Louisiana lost 45 killed and 126 wounded, the heaviest casualties of any unit in the brigade. On 25 June, the Union forces exploded a mine under the 3rd Louisiana Redan and killed six men and wounded 21 more. The Federals occupied the crater left by the explosion, but the Confederates were able to throw grenades into the seized position, inflicting about 30 casualties. On 1 July, a second mine was detonated under the 3rd Louisiana's defenses, killing one and wounding 21. The second mine mortally wounded both Captain Kinney (Company A) and Captain Johnson (Company I). This time Union troops made no attempt to occupy the position.

The Confederates surrendered at Vicksburg and the soldiers were paroled until they could be exchanged. Gilmore resigned on 20 August 1863. Two days later, Russell was appointed colonel, Pierson became lieutenant colonel, and John S. Richards was promoted major. The 3rd Louisiana Infantry's soldiers were officially exchanged on 12 September 1863 and ordered to report to Alexandria. However, very few of the men showed up.

By December 1863, there were only 38 fit men in camp. A few men from the regiment were absorbed into the 22nd Louisiana Consolidated Regiment as Company H at Enterprise, Mississippi in January 1864. The regiment was not mustered until July 1864 at Pineville. The unit marched to Camp Boggs in Shreveport in August 1864 and mounted guard duty there for the remainder of the war. During this period, the 3rd Louisiana was assigned to Allen Thomas's brigade in Camille de Polignac's division. The regiment disbanded on 19–20 May 1865. Out of 1,136 men enrolled into the 3rd Louisiana Infantry, 123 were killed in action, 74 died of disease, 3 died in accidents, 2 were murdered, and 1 drowned.

== See also ==
- List of Louisiana Confederate Civil War units
- Louisiana in the Civil War
