= William H. Tunnard =

Soldier, author and journalist

- Born: March 14, 1837; Newark, New Jersey, U.S.
- Died: July 31, 1916 (aged 79)
- Occupations: Journalist, author
- Writing career
- Subject: American civil war
- Notable work: A Southern Record: The History of the Third Regiment Louisiana Infantry

William H. Tunnard (March 14, 1837 – July 31, 1916) was an American Confederate soldier, newspaper editor, and Civil War history author. His book A Southern Record: The History of the Third Regiment Louisiana Infantry was published in 1866. A reviewer writing during the 20th century stated "A Southern Record has been recognized as one of the best first person accounts of the Civil War." Historian Merton Coulter declared it to be an 'exceptionally valuable commentary,' while Allan Nevins described it as an 'excellent composite of personal accounts of battles and army life.'"

== Life ==
Tunnard was born in Newark, New Jersey and settled in Baton Rouge, Louisiana while he was young. He attended Kenyon College, where he studied to become an Episcopal minister.

His book has been republished several times, including by the University of Arkansas Press in 1999 and the University of Michigan Press in 2006.

Shortly after Louisiana's secession in 1861, Tunnard joined the "Pelican Rifles," which participated in the seizure of the federal arsenal at Baton Rouge. The Rifles became a company of the Third Louisiana Volunteers, led by Col. Louis Hebert. As part of Company K, Tunnard rose to the rank of sergeant. He was captured at Vicksburg on July 4, 1863, and paroled there four days later. He reappeared on the rolls of Allen's Brigade Headquarters at Shreveport on March 29, 1864, on a roll of prisoners for exchange at Natchitoches, and listed as paroled on June 7, 1865.

The unit engaged at the battles of Wilson's Creek, Pea Ridge, Iuka, and Corinth, as well as the siege of Vicksburg. About 18 percent of the Third Louisiana's enlisted men and officers were killed during the Civil War.

After the war, Tunnard had a lengthy career in North Louisiana journalism. In the early days of Reconstruction, he edited the Red River News, a Republican newspaper in Natchitoches which supported civil rights for African Americans. But "the heart of the editor...was not in his work" and he switched over to the Democratic press, which opposed racial equality. He became editor of the Natchitoches Times, which later described the paper under his leadership as "the most powerful exponent of white supremacy in the state." The Times also argued that he would have been "one of the leading men in the state" politically after Reconstruction were it not for "his one mistake" in briefly working for a Republican newspaper — though evidence suggests he was still editing a Republican journal in 1874. He did serve a term as clerk of court of Natchitoches Parish from 1877 to 1880.

He also edited at various times the Baton Rouge Comet, the Baton Rouge Gazette, the Natchitoches Republican, the Natchitoches Democrat, the Arcadia Herald in Bienville Parish, the Southern Sentinel in Winnfield, and both the Shreveport Times and the Shreveport Journal.

Tunnard also served as commander of the Louisiana Division of the Sons of Confederate Veterans.

== Books ==
- A Southern Record: The History of the Third Regiment Louisiana Infantry, published in 1866.
