= Meadows Museum =

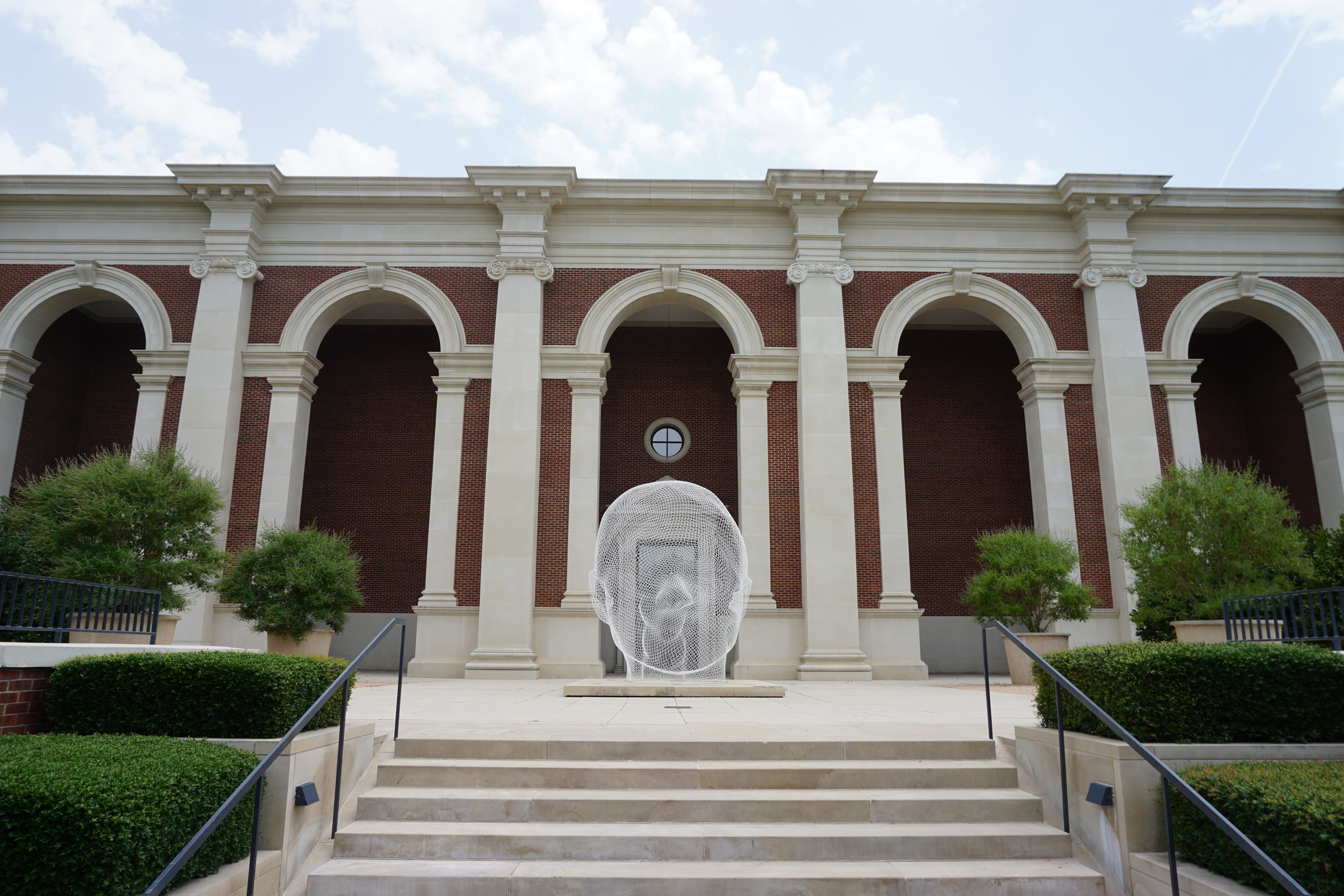
- Museum entrance along Bishop Boulevard
- Established: 1965; 61 years ago
- Location: Southern Methodist University; 5900 Bishop Boulevard; Dallas, Texas 75205
- Coordinates: 32.8384°N 96.7843°W
- Type: Art museum
- Key holdings: Sibyl with Tabula Rasa (1648); Yard with Lunatics (1794)
- Visitors: 50,000+ annually (as of 2015)
- Founder: Algur H. Meadows
- Director: Amanda W. Dotseth
- Owners: Meadows School of the Arts; Southern Methodist University
- Public transit access: DART rail: Blue Line Orange Line Red Line (via Mockingbird station)
- Website: www.meadowsmuseumdallas.org

The Meadows Museum, nicknamed "Prado on the Prairie", is a two-story, 66,000 sq. ft.art museum in Dallas, Texas on the campus of Southern Methodist University (SMU). Operating as a division of SMU's Meadows School of the Arts, the museum houses one of the largest and most comprehensive collections of Spanish art outside of Spain, with works dating from the 10th to the 21st centuries.

== Collections ==
The museum's primary collection contains works by renowned painters including El Greco, Diego Velázquez, Ribera, Murillo, Goya, Miró, Sorolla, Dalí and Picasso. Additional highlights include Renaissance-era altarpieces, monumental Baroque canvases, rococo oil sketches, polychrome wood sculptures, Impressionist landscapes, modernist abstractions, a comprehensive collection of the graphic works of Goya, and select sculptures by major twentieth-century masters, including Rodin, Maillol, Giacometti, Moore, Smith, and Oldenburg. In addition to its primary collection, the Meadows Museum administers SMU's University Art Collection, which includes works by leading artists of the North Texas region like Frank Reaugh, Jerry Bywaters, Otis Dozier, Alexandre Hogue, and William Lester.

== Facility ==
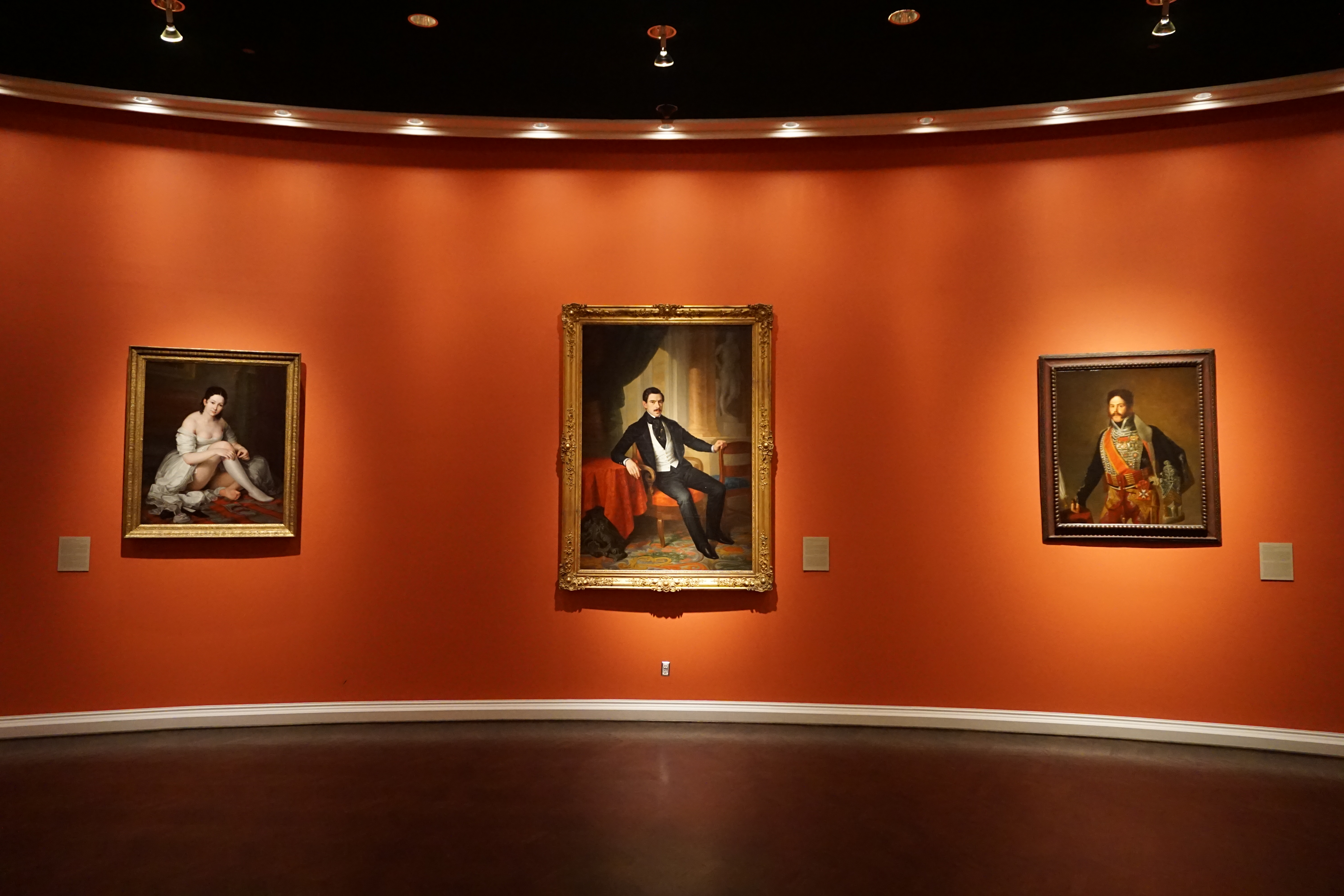
The Gene and Jerry Jones Great Hall of the Meadows Museum

The museum currently occupies a neo-Palladian building designed by Chicago-based architects Hammond Beeby Rupert Ainge, which was completed in 2001 and dedicated in a ceremony that included King Juan Carlos I and Queen Sofía of Spain. The structure features naturally lit painting galleries and extensive exhibition space.

== History ==
In 1965, the Meadows Museum opened its doors to the public for the first time. The museum's collection of Spanish art and the galleries for its display were a gift to Southern Methodist University from Algur H. Meadows, a Dallas businessman and founder of the General American Oil Company of Texas. During the 1950s business took Meadows frequently to Madrid, where repeated visits to the Prado Museum inspired what would become a lasting interest in the art of the Spanish Golden Age. By 1962, Meadows had amassed his own collection of Spanish paintings, which became the foundation of the museum's collection. Most of the works were revealed to be forgeries, many from Elmyr de Hory. After the opening of the museum raised doubts about the quality of some of these works, SMU appointed the museum's first professional director, William B. Jordan, who served in that capacity from 1967 until 1981. Supported by Meadows until his death in 1978, the museum initiated a vigorous new phase of collecting, during which the core of the present collection was formed.

Since 1978, the museum's efforts to develop and care for the collection have continued with the support of The Meadows Foundation, a general purpose philanthropic institution created and incorporated by Algur Meadows in 1948. This fruitful partnership has resulted in a comprehensive campaign of conservation, the support of scholarly research of the collection, and a number of important acquisitions, particularly in the areas of medieval, Baroque, and 20th-century art.

A 2013 exhibition titled Sorolla & America features paintings by the Spanish impressionist Joaquin Sorolla. The Meadows was key in developing this new show, exploring for the first time Sorolla's unique relationship with the United States in the early twentieth century. It began at the Meadows (13 December 2013 – 19 April 2014), then traveled to the San Diego Museum of Art (30 May – 26 August 2014) and Fundación MAPFRE in Madrid (23 September 2014 – 11 January 2015).

The Meadows Museum is part of the Monuments Men and Women Museum Network, launched in 2021 by the Monuments Men Foundation for the Preservation of Art.

== Selected paintings ==
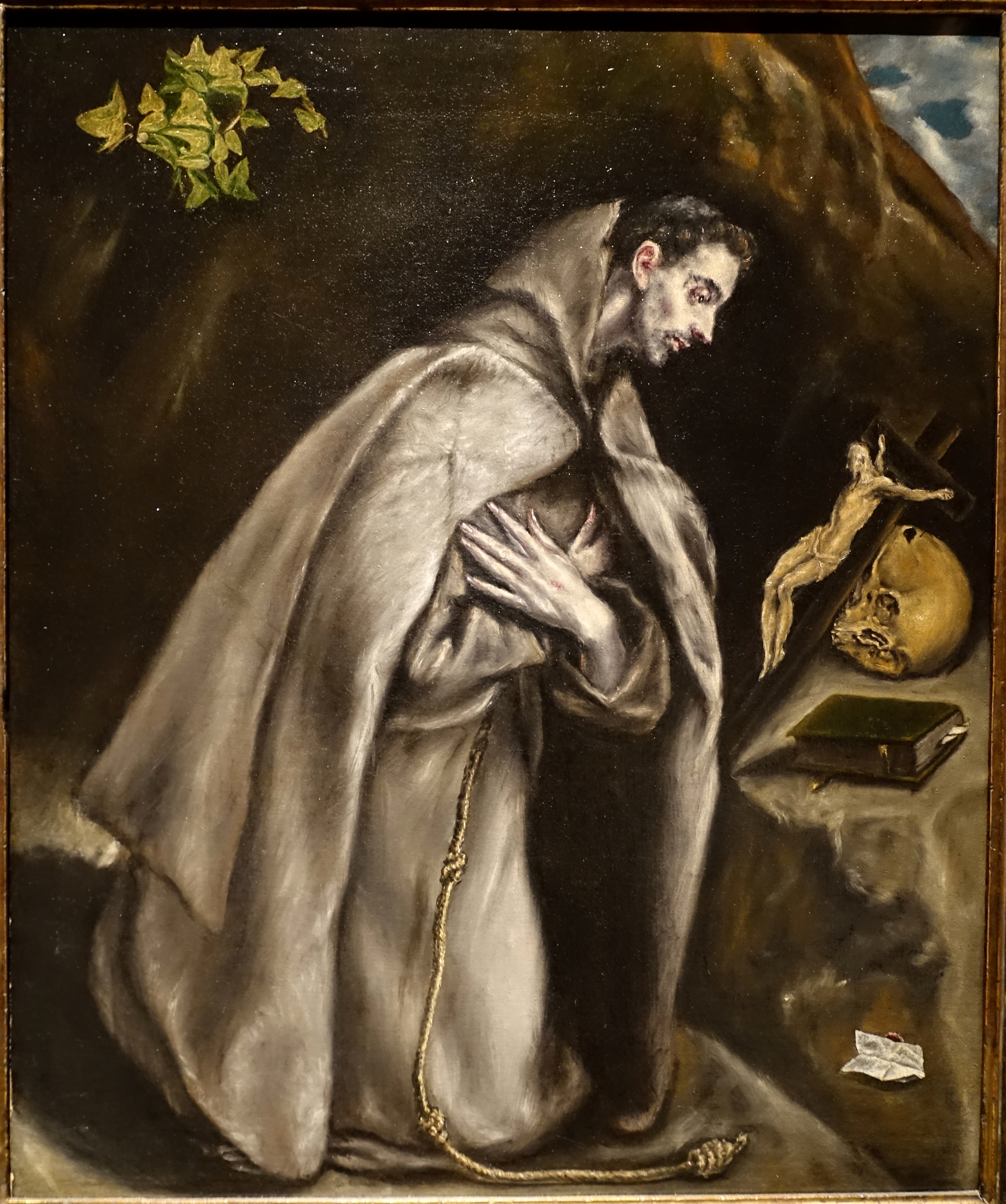
El Greco, Saint Francis Kneeling in Meditation, c. 1605–1610

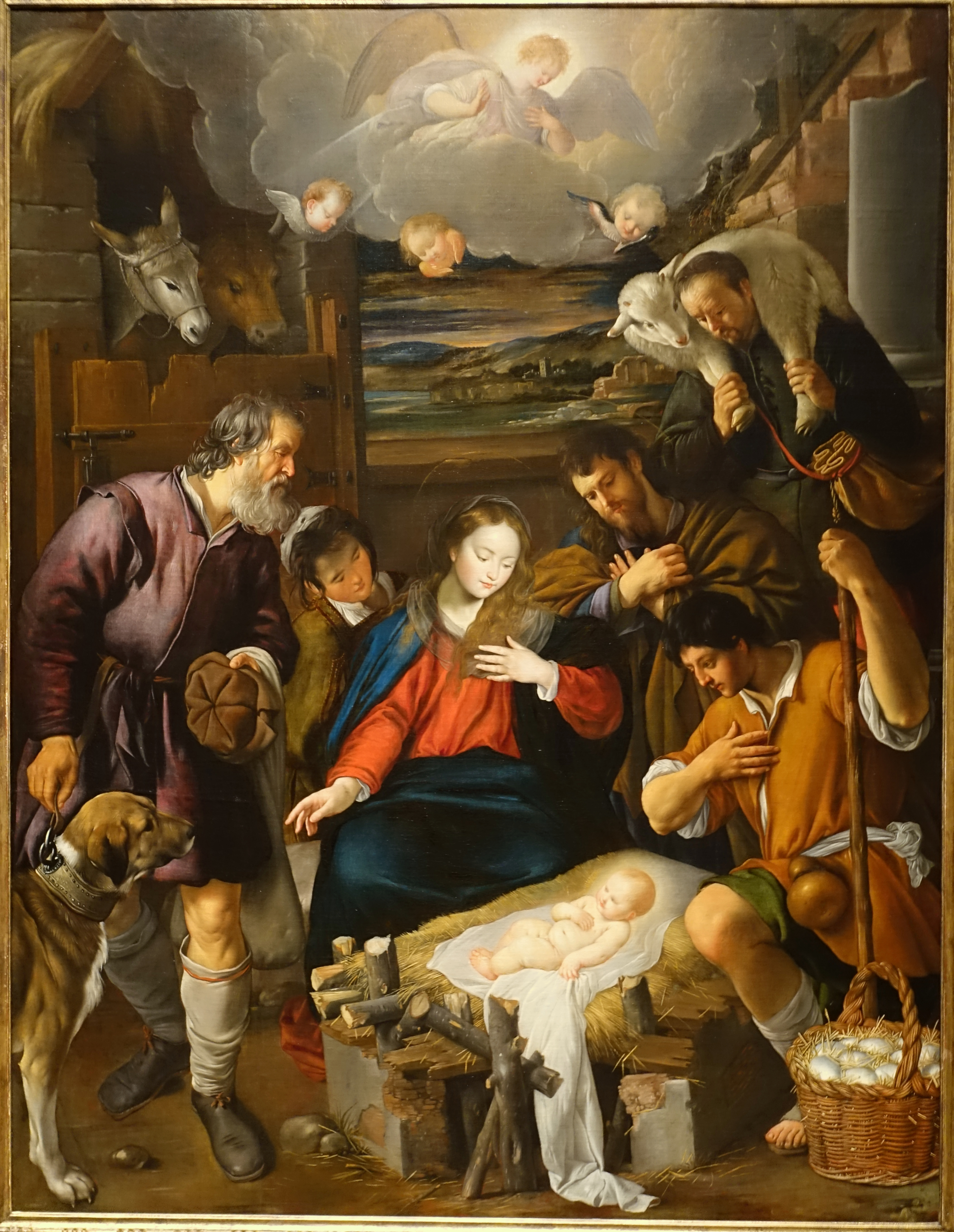
Juan Bautista Maíno, Adoration of the Shepherds, 1615–20

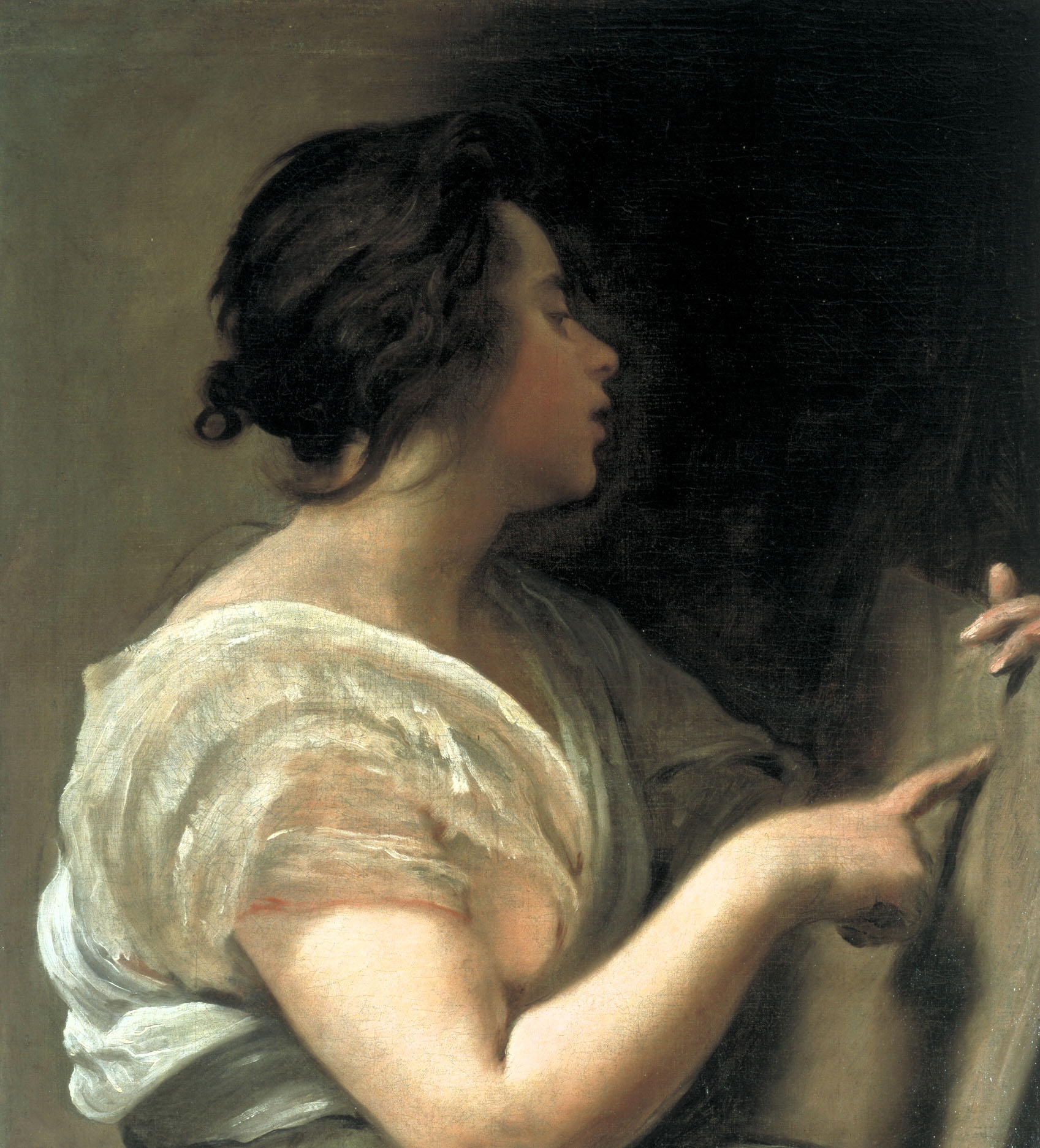
Diego Velázquez, Sibyl with Tabula Rasa, 1648

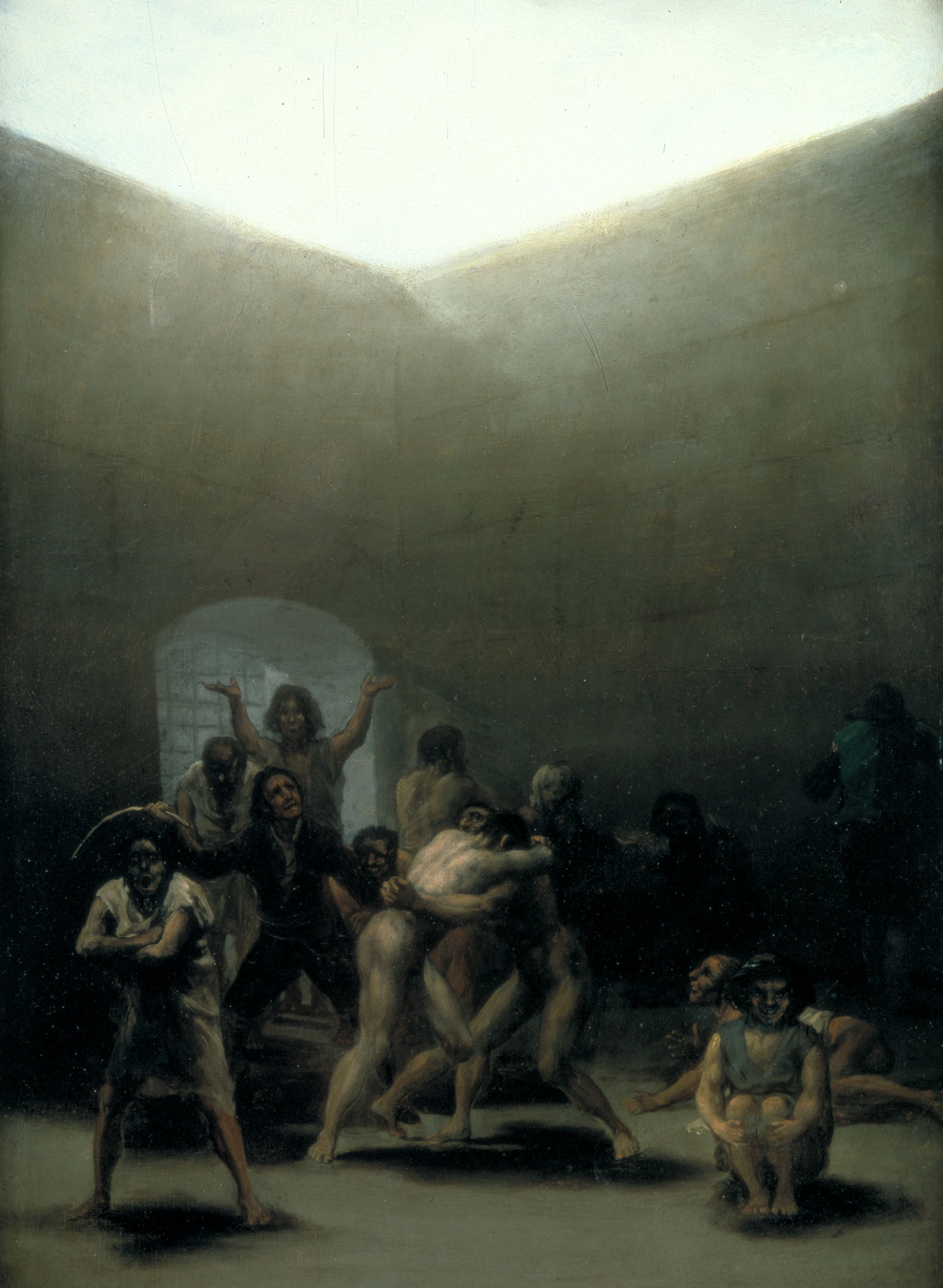
Francisco Goya, Yard with Lunatics, 1794

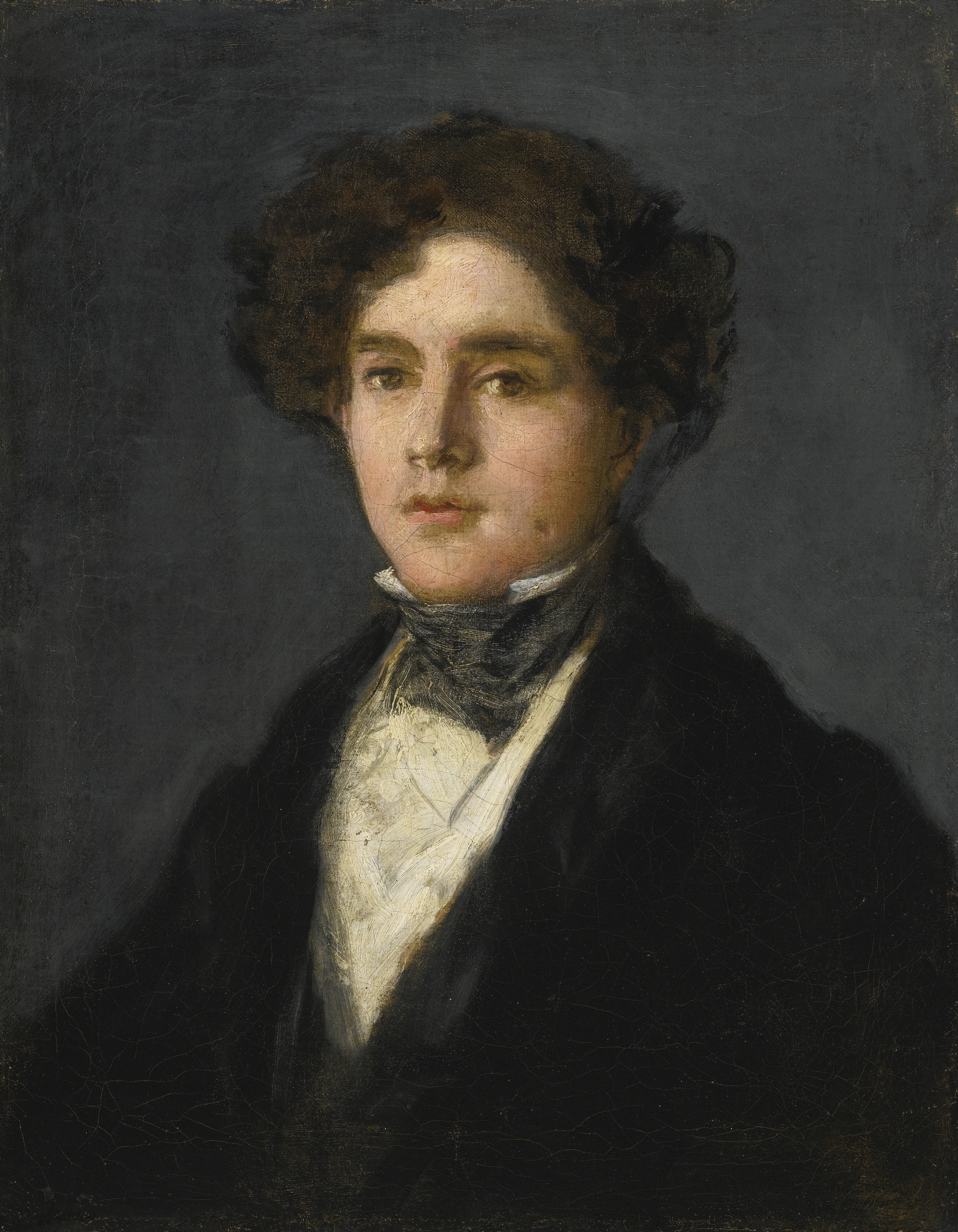
Francisco Goya, Portrait of Mariano Goya, the Artist's Grandson, 1827

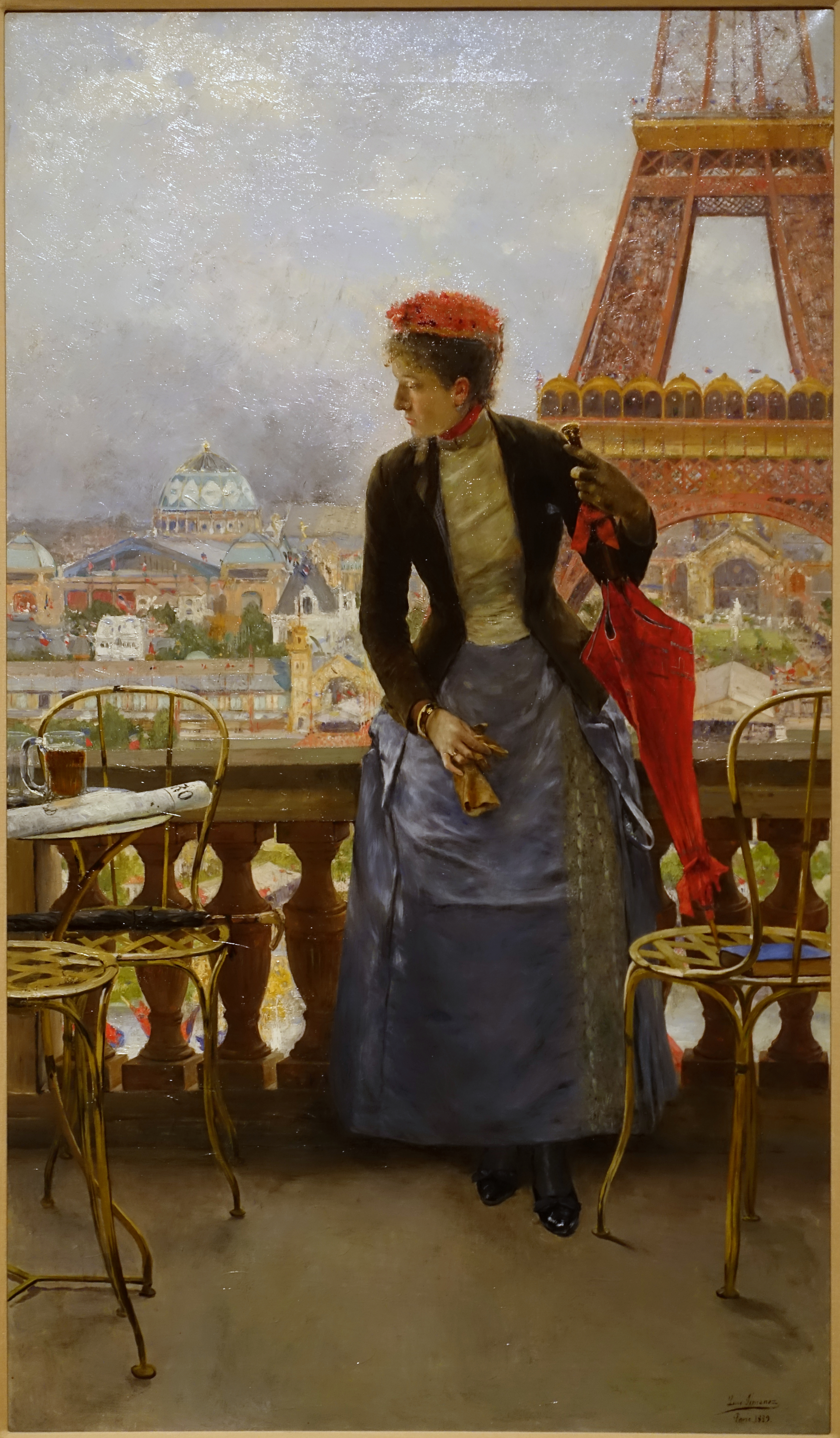
Luis Jiménez Aranda, Lady at the Paris Exposition, 1889
