= Bobby Wilkins =

American baseball player (1922-2010)

- Shortstop
- Born: August 11, 1922; Denton, North Carolina, US
- Died: January 3, 2010 (aged 87); Shreveport, Louisiana, US
- Batted: Right Threw: Right

MLB debut
- April 18, 1944, for the Philadelphia Athletics

Last MLB appearance
- September 6, 1945, for the Philadelphia Athletics

MLB statistics
- Batting average: .257
- Home runs: 0
- Runs batted in: 7
- Stats at Baseball Reference

Teams
- Philadelphia Athletics (1944–1945)

Robert Linwood Wilkins (August 11, 1922 – January 3, 2010) was an American shortstop in Major League Baseball who played from 1944 through 1945 for the Philadelphia Athletics. Listed at 5 ft 9 in (1.75 m), 165 lb., Wilkins batted and threw right-handed. He was born in Denton, North Carolina.

Wilkins attended Catawba College, where he played in the baseball squad along with Vern Benson and Ray Poole. He entered the majors in 1944 with the Athletics, playing for them in part of two seasons as the primarily backup to incumbent shortstop Ed Busch.

In a two-season career, Wilkins was a .257 hitter (46-for-179) in 86 games, including 29 runs, six doubles, seven RBI, two stolen bases, and a .304 on-base percentage.

After that, Wilkins attended Duke University in Durham, North Carolina and graduated from FBI Academy in Quantico, Virginia.

A resident of Shreveport, Louisiana for 60 years, Wilkins also played Minor League Baseball for eleven seasons, four of them with the Shreveport Sports of the Texas League, where he set league records of 159 most consecutive chances without committing an error (1949), and for the most double plays (71) started in a season (1951). He posted a .249 career average in 1017 games.

Wilkins died at the age of 87 following a lengthy illness, and is interred at Greenwood Cemetery in Shreveport.

== Sources ==
- Career statistics from Baseball Reference · Baseball Reference (Minors) · Retrosheet · Baseball Almanac
- Shreveport Times Obituary
