= The Madhouse =

Painting by Francisco Goya

- Casa de locos (Spanish)
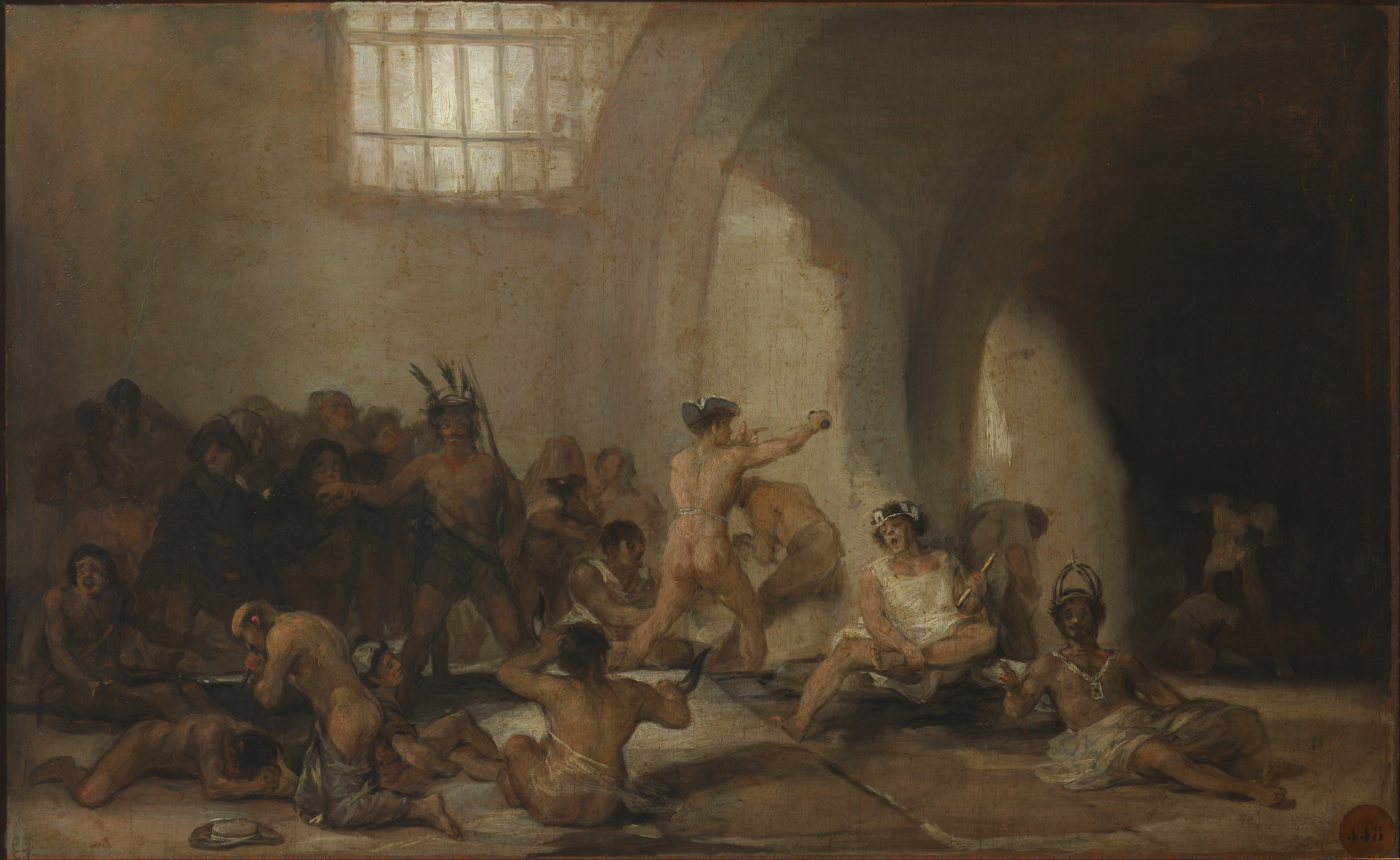
- Artist: Francisco Goya
- Year: 1812–1819
- Medium: Oil on panel
- Dimensions: 46 cm × 73 cm (18 in × 29 in)
- Location: Real Academia de Bellas Artes de San Fernando, Madrid

The Madhouse (Spanish: Casa de locos) or Asylum (Spanish: Manicomio) is an oil on panel painting by Francisco Goya. He produced it between 1812 and 1819 based on a scene he had witnessed at the then-renowned Zaragoza mental asylum. It depicts a mental asylum and the inhabitants in various states of madness. The creation came after a tumultuous period of Goya's life in which he suffered from serious illness and experienced hardships within his family.

== Composition ==
The painting is marked by its Piranesian, claustrophobic architecture, the painting's only light source being a barred window high up on the wall, meant to repress the figures below. These figures are distinct characters and borderline caricatures, all engaged in grotesque and pitiable behaviour – one wears what seems to be a wild-feathered headdress, another is fighting in a tricorne hat, another makes a gesture of blessing to the viewer, whilst many of the others are naked. Some of the figures can also be interpreted allegorically, as a gallery of parodies of powerful figures in society, such as the clergy or the army (represented by the man in the tricorne). It develops the topic of 'the world of dreams' (Spanish: 'mundo al revés') and is related to Goya's engravings series Los disparates.

== Inspiration ==
Psychiatric institutions were a popular topic in the salons of the Spanish Enlightenment around this time, especially their practices, such as manacling patients. The mentally ill were seen as possessed and often found themselves subjects of public entertainment. Goya had firsthand experience with insanity, as an aunt and uncle of his had suffered from it. He was also familiar with suffering from illness, as he had fallen extremely ill in 1792, struggling to keep his balance and walk as well as suffering partial blindness and deafness. While he eventually recovered, he remained deaf for the rest of his life, and it has been speculated that he had been suffering from Vogt-Koyanagi-Harada syndrome, though it is unknown what it truly was. During his recovery, he suffered from bouts of depression, stating that he found himself "sometimes raving with a mood that I myself cannot stand." Around this time, he also experienced the death of his brother-in-law from illness. This period of Goya's life inspired a change in the composition of his works towards darker compositions than early in his life. Speaking of the set of paintings that The Madhouse concluded, Goya said; "I have succeeded in making observations for which there is normally no opportunity in commissioned works, which give no scope for fantasy and invention."

== Related works ==
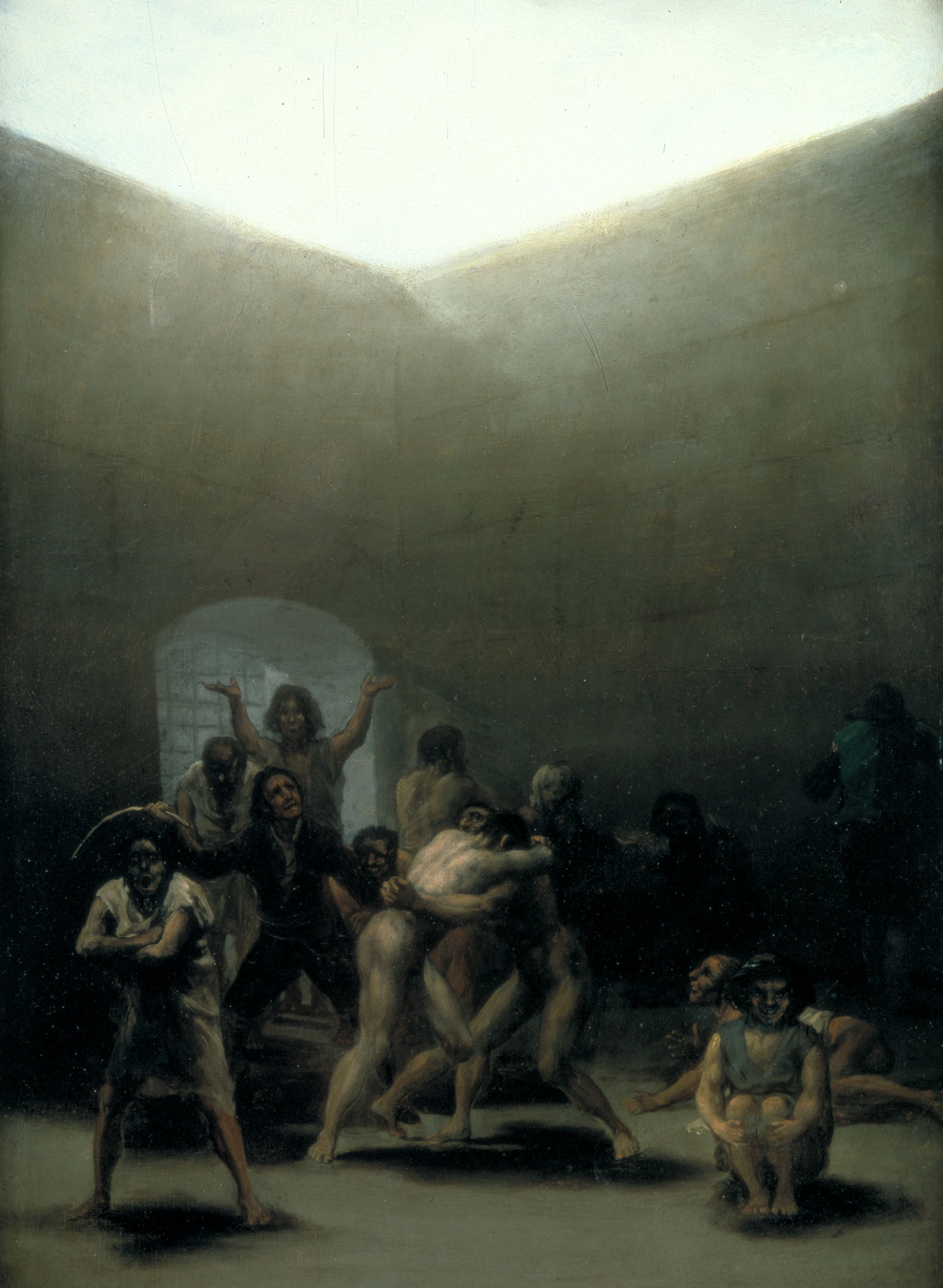
Yard with Lunatics c. 1794

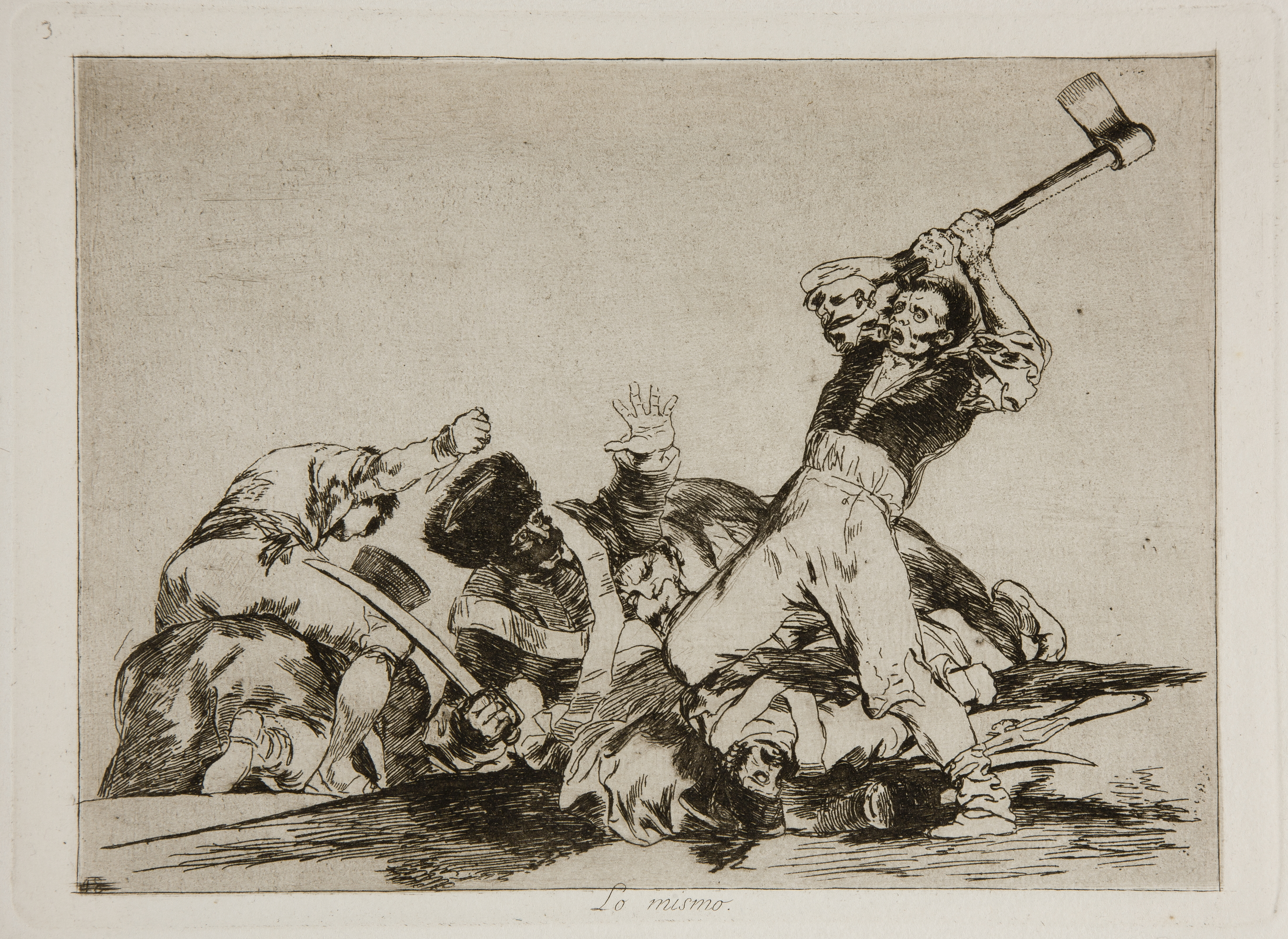
Plate 3 of Disasters of War: Lo mismo (The same).

Goya had already touched on the issues of mental illnesses and suffering his 1794 painting Yard with Lunatics. Yard with Lunatics depicts the manic patients being let out into the asylum yard, where the central figures wrestle while the guard attempts to restrain them. This work would have been composed around the time that Goya was recovering from his illness. Yard with Lunatics is unique for its time due to its depiction of the inhabitants, straying from the stereotypical depictions of the insane and instead portraying more realistic behaviors and actions.

The Madhouse differs from Yard with Lunatics by placing the subjects in a dingy room, while portraying them as people who are suffering, as opposed to people who need to be restrained for their own good. These two works depicting asylums were not Goya's only exploration of suffering. Over the period of 1810-1820, he created eighty-three etchings that became a series named The Disasters of War (Spanish: Los Desastres de la Guerra). Not published until 1863, thirty-five years after his death, the series shows the atrocities committed by Napoleon's forces during both the Dos de Mayo Uprising and the Peninsular War. In these works, Goya strips the surrounding elements to force the audience to focus on the shocking nature of the subject. The etchings don't appear to have a narrative, as each one depicts a scene independent of others. Goya has become known for his depictions of these subjects of violence and suffering due to his willingness to leave out the beauty of art and instead create pieces that shock and disturb the viewer.

== Critical reception ==
Critics have not reached a consensus about the meaning or purpose of The Madhouse (as well as Yard with Lunatics). Some have argued that it exemplifies how Goya lost touch with the public (as it is not a work that one would typically hang in a home setting), while others have said that it fits in the same market as pieces that depict violence. It has also been debated how effective, if at all, this work was in the movement to reform asylums (led by Philippe Pinel and William Tuke), and if it was even attempting to cause change or was instead affirming the presumption that the mentally ill should be confined and shackled.

== See also ==
- List of works by Francisco Goya
