= Greenwood Cemetery (Shreveport, Louisiana) =

Coordinates: 32°30′07″N 93°43′53″W

Greenwood Cemetery is an historic rural cemetery in Shreveport, Louisiana. It was established in 1893 and is the second oldest cemetery in the city.

== Notable burials ==
- Newton C. Blanchard, politician
- Jean Despujols, painter
- Jerome B. Gilmore, businessperson and politician
- Bobby Wilkins, baseball player
