= Jean Despujols =

French-American painter

Jean Despujols (Salles en Gironde 19 March 1886-Shreveport, 1965) was a French, later naturalised American, painter.

He was a pupil of Paul Quinsac at the école des Beaux-Arts of Bordeaux. In 1914 he won the Prix de Rome for painting but the outbreak of World War I suspended the French residencies at the villa Médicis. He had his stay in Rome after the war with his fellow painter Jean Dupas. His associations with America began in 1924-1936 as a teacher of the American art students sent to study at the École des Beaux-Arts de Fontainebleau.

In 1936, he won the Prix de l'Indochine, and was selected by the Grand Conseil Economique of French Indochina to undertake a tour of Vietnam, Cambodia and Laos painting and drawing what he saw.

When World War II broke out he emigrated to America, settling in Louisiana, and is buried at Greenwood Cemetery in Shreveport. The Texas oil millionaire Algur H. Meadows acquired a 360-piece collection of oil paintings and watercolors in 1969 and the Meadows Museum of Art at Centenary College of Louisiana was built to house these paintings.
