= Meadows School of the Arts =

Fine arts school

Coordinates: 32.841014°N 96.786144°W

Algur H. Meadows School of the Arts
- Type: Private
- Established: 1917 (School of Music); 1964 (School of the Arts)
- Parent institution: Southern Methodist University
- Location: University Park, Texas, United States
- Website: www.smu.edu/meadows

The Algur H. Meadows School of the Arts is the fine arts unit at Southern Methodist University, located in University Park, Texas, U.S. It is known for its programs in advertising, art, art history, arts administration, cinema, performing arts, journalism, corporate communications, and public relations.

Meadows School of the Arts began as the School of Music in 1917 and became Meadows School of the Arts in 1964, incorporating studies in art and theatre. In 1969, thanks to Algur H. Meadows and The Meadows Foundation, the school was named the Algur H. Meadows School of the Arts.

== Areas of study ==
Meadows School of the Arts offers bachelor's and master's degrees and Artist Certificates. Courses include the fields of advertising, art, art history, arts entrepreneurship and arts management, communication studies, creative computation, dance, film and media arts, journalism, music and theatre. Divisions include the Temerlin Advertising Institute, Art, Art History, Arts Management and Arts Entrepreneurship, Cinema-Television, Corporate Communications and Public Affairs (CCPA), Dance, Journalism, Music, and Theatre.

- International Masters in Arts Management

Together with HEC Montreal and SDA Bocconi, the Meadows School offers a 1-year master's degree covering the arts market, marketing for cultural enterprises and strategy. Students spend a term in Dallas, a term in Montreal and a term in Milan.

== Owen Arts Center ==
The Owen Arts Center is one of two facilities that house the School. Located here are faculty offices, dean's office, administration offices, academic facilities, support and performance spaces, including:

- Bob Hope Theatre
- Caruth Auditorium
- Charles S. Sharp Performing Arts Studio
- Doolin Gallery
- Greer Garson Theatre
- Jake and Nancy Hamon Arts Library
- Margo Jones Theatre
- O’Donnell Lecture/Recital Hall
- Kathy Bates Studio
- Mudge Drawing Studio
- Taubman Atrium

== Meadows Museum ==
The Meadows Museum serves as a resource for local schools, colleges, the regional community and visitors from around the world. Showcased is a large collection of Spanish art with works dating from the 10th to the 21st centuries which was donated by the school's namesource, Algur H. Meadows. The collection also includes works by El Greco, Velázquez, Ribera, Murillo, Goya, Miró, Rodin, Jacques Lipchitz, Henry Moore, Claes Oldenburg, David Smith, Fritz Wotruba, and Santiago Calatrava.

== Awards ==
Beginning in 1981 the school awarded the Algur H. Meadows Award for Excellence in the Arts, which enabled students to interact with artists working in residence. These artists included Angela Lansbury, Arthur Miller, Ingmar Bergman, Jacob Lawrence, and Stephen Sondheim. It was announced in 2009 that the Meadows Award would be replaced by the Meadows Prize, an international arts residency. The prize allows up to four artists to interact with Meadows students and affiliated arts organizations and leave a lasting legacy in Dallas, whether a piece of artwork for the community or a new composition to be performed locally. The inaugural recipients were eighth blackbird and Creative Time.

Meadows alumni have won notable prizes including the Pulitzer Prize, Tony Award, Emmy Awards, and Academy Awards.

Advertising students placed first in the National Student Advertising Competition twice between 2002 and 2004. In two years, three CCPA students ranked in the top 10 of a PRWeekly competition.

== Alumni artists ==
Alumni artists and art historians contribute to museums and collections nationwide, including New York's Metropolitan Museum of Art and Museum of Modern Art.

On February 28, 2006, SMU announced that the Meadows Foundation had given a gift of US$33 million to the Meadows School and to the affiliated Meadows Museum. This gift is the largest single donation in the history of the Meadows Foundation. It is also the third largest individual contribution ever made to SMU, surpassed by two gifts of US$35 million.
