= Algur H. Meadows =

American oilman, art collector and philanthropist

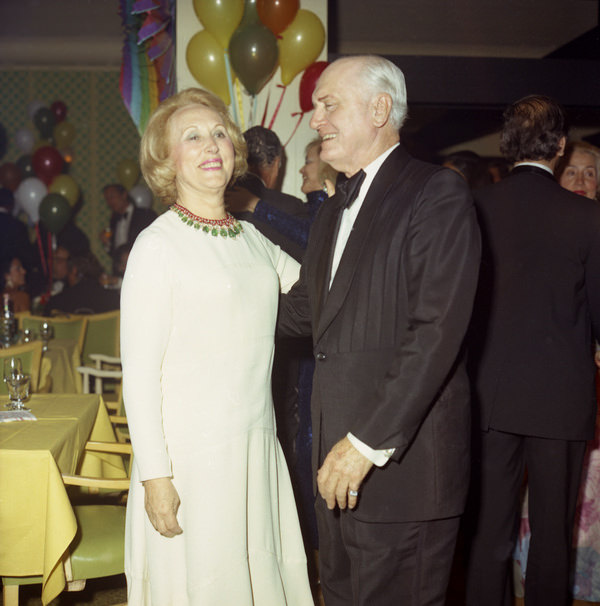
Algur Meadows with cosmetics entrepreneur Estee Lauder in 1972.

Algur Hurtle Meadows (April 24, 1899 – June 10, 1978) was an American oil tycoon, art collector, and benefactor of Southern Methodist University and other institutions.

== Life ==
Meadows was born on April 20, 1899, in Vidalia, Georgia, the third of seven children of John Morgan and Sally Marie Elora (Dailey) Meadows. After receiving his diploma from Vidalia Collegiate Institute in 1915, he studied at Georgia and Alabama Business College and Mercer University, both in Macon, Georgia. Meadows subsequently left Mercer to travel around the South with a friend, during which journey he held a variety of jobs. He first manifested his business acumen in his accounting work for Standard Oil Company in Shreveport, Louisiana, from 1921 to 1929. During this period he earned a law degree from Centenary College and was admitted to the Louisiana state bar, in 1926. On December 11, 1922, he married Virginia Stuart Garrison, with whom he had one son.

In the fall of 1928 Meadows and friends Henry W. Peters, his son Eric Woods, and Ralph G. Trippett founded a loan company, the General Finance Company, which later became the General American Finance System in 1930. In the summer of 1936 Meadows, Peters and Trippett united with J. W. Gilliland, a petroleum expert, to form the General American Oil Company. The headquarters were then moved from Shreveport to Dallas in 1937. The new company experienced a phenomenal expansion in operations, due to an ingenious method of acquiring oil-producing properties that Meadows developed. The scheme, which Meadows dubbed the "ABC plan," involved three parties in the purchase transaction to minimize tax liability and the use of interest-bearing oil payments to meet a large percentage of the purchase price. Meadows became the president and major stockholder of the General American Oil Company in 1941 and was elected chairman of the board in 1950. By 1959 his company had acquired 2,990 oil wells in fifteen states and Canada and was drilling for oil in Spain. In 1983, Meadows, Trippett, and Peters' son, Eric Woods, sold General American Oil Company to Phillips Petroleum.

On business trips to Madrid in the 1950s, Meadows insisted on staying at the Ritz Carlton. A hotel located right next door to the Museo Nacional del Prado, where Meadows frequented which inspired an interest in Spanish old masters. He began acquiring paintings attributed to artists such as El Greco and Goya. Following the death of his wife in 1961, he donated his collection and a million-dollar endowment to Southern Methodist University in order to establish a museum of Spanish art in her memory. He subsequently donated a collection of contemporary Italian sculpture to SMU in order to found an outdoor sculpture garden in honor of his second wife, Elizabeth Boggs Bartholow, whom he married in 1962. In recognition of Meadows's multiple gifts, exceeding $34 million, the SMU trustees named the university's school of arts in his honor in 1969, Meadows School of the Arts.

In 1964 Meadows, with the encouragement of his second wife, began collecting paintings by French Impressionists and post-Impressionists. Three years later, in a widely publicized discovery, he learned that thirty-eight of the fifty-eight works in his private collection were forgeries and that many of the earlier works in SMU's Meadows Museum collection were falsely attributed. Meadows immediately gave the museum a million dollars to replace the questionable works and began rebuilding his private collection, much of which was donated to the Dallas Museum of Art after his death.

In 1965, Meadows purchased 360 pieces of original artwork from the family of the recently deceased French artist, Jean Despujols. Despujols immigrated to the United States during World War II and lived in Shreveport, Louisiana until his death. Meadows paid the Despujols family $250,000 for the paintings and promptly donated them to Centenary College. He also gifted $200,000 to the college to remodel the former administration building into an art gallery and later gave an additional $150,000 to be used for museum maintenance. The Meadows Museum of Art opened on Centenary's campus in 1975.

Meadows generously benefitted programs throughout Texas in health, education, visual arts, and social services, under the auspices of the Meadows Foundation, which he and his first wife established in 1948. He was on the board of directors of Republic National Bank of Dallas, a trustee of SMU, and on the board of directors at St. Mark's School, Presbyterian Hospital, Children's Medical Center, Hope Cottage, and the Wadley Research Center. Meadows was a Presbyterian, a Mason, and a member of numerous professional, civic, and social organizations, including the American Petroleum Institute, Independent Petroleum Association, Dallas Petroleum Club, Dallas Art Association, Dallas Citizens Council, and Sigma Nu fraternity. He received an honorary doctor of humane letters degree from SMU in 1965 and an honorary doctor of laws degree from Centenary College in 1969. He died in a Dallas hospital on June 10, 1978, after an automobile accident in Duncanville, Texas the night before, and was entombed at Hillcrest Mausoleum. His legacy of generosity to the public lives on in the Meadows Museum of Art at Centenary College, the Meadows Museum at SMU, now considered to be the finest collection of Spanish art outside of Spain, and through the beneficence of the Meadows Foundation, which by the end of 2013 had donated more than $1 billion to charitable organizations in Texas.

== See also ==
- The Meadows Building earn an award of Midcentury Modern Design, in The Preservation Dallas 2021 Achievement Awards
- Emyl de Hory
- Art forgery
