= Jerome B. Gilmore =

Jerome Boneparte Gilmore (born c. 1827) was an American soldier who fought with the Union Army during the American Civil War.

== Biography ==
Gilmore was born in Kentucky c. 1827 and was raised in Louisville. He worked in his brother's well-known Louisville Gun and Fish Tackle shop.

Gilmore arrived in Shreveport, Louisiana in 1849, working and living with gunsmith David Pobst (b. 1821, Ohio). Gilmore went into the gunsmith business for himself in 1853 and was one of a handful in the country that were distributors of the famous Deringer pistols. Barrels of his derringers were sometimes hand-engraved "J. B. Gilmore, Shreveport, La.", while others were stamped. A very rare cased-set of dueling pistols marked "J. B. Gilmore" is known to exist. Today, all pistols with his markings are highly prized.

In about 1857, Jerome married Emma (b. 1832, Tennessee), and by 1860, they had a daughter, Emma M. Gilmore. In 1861, son William F. F. Gilmore was born.

Gilmore joined the 3rd Louisiana Infantry at the outbreak of the Civil War, entering as a captain. He was later wounded in battle and left the military at the rank of lieutenant colonel. After the War, he left gunsmithing, becoming a merchant in Shreveport. In 1869, his son Henry Gilmore was born. That year, during Reconstruction, he was appointed by the federal government to be mayor of Shreveport, serving in that capacity until 1871. By 1880, Gilmore was a cotton buyer.

Gilmore's wife, Emma, died in Shreveport in 1895. Jerome died in 1900. Both are buried in the Greenwood Cemetery in Shreveport.
