= Female Figure (Velázquez) =

1648 painting by Diego Velázquez

Sibyl with Tabula Rasa
- Sibila con tábula rasa (Spanish)
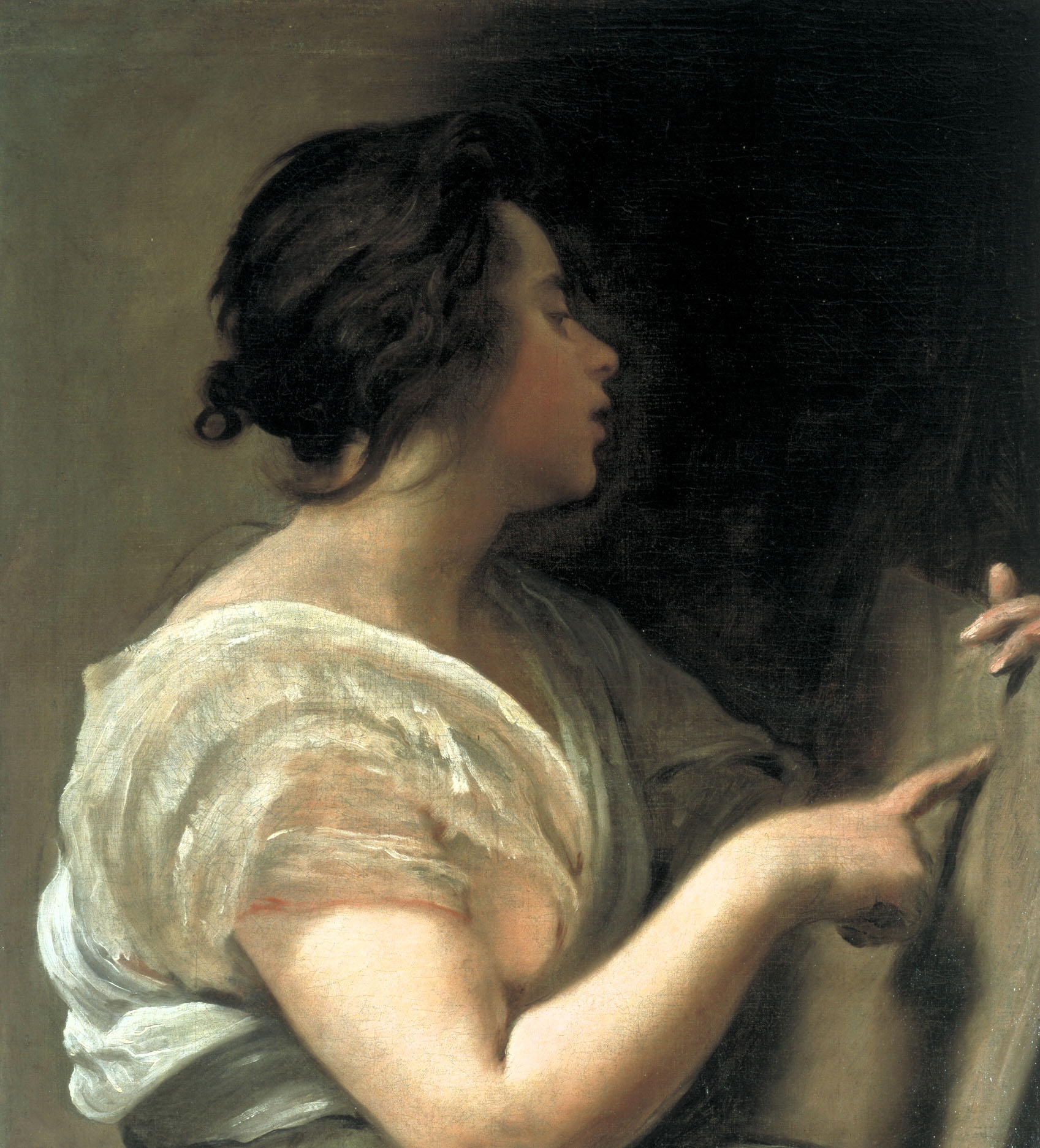
- Artist: Diego Velázquez
- Year: 1648
- Medium: Oil on canvas
- Dimensions: 64 cm × 58 cm (25 in × 23 in)
- Location: Meadows Museum; Dallas

Female Figure (or Sibyl with Tabula Rasa, Spanish: Sibila con tábula rasa) is a small, probably unfinished, 1648 oil on canvas painting by Diego Rodríguez de Silva y Velázquez, the leading artist of the Spanish Golden Age.

Although the identity of the woman is unknown, she is usually believed to be a sibyl, based on her similarity to the artist's 1631–32 Sibyl (Portrait of Juana Pacheco?). Both show profile views of women in half length, holding a tablet.

The c. 1648 date is given based on its stylistic resemblances to the artist's Rokeby Venus. Both works share the evocative, loose and fluid brush strokes generally accepted as influenced by Velázquez's exposure to Titian during his 1629–30 and 1649–51 visits to Italy. Female Figure is noted for its "restrained elegance, muted color harmonies, and the evocative poetry of the figure's parted lips and "lost" profile."

== Description ==
In medieval Christian tradition, sibyls became prophetesses warning the pagan Romans of the coming of Christ. Sibyls were often, as here, portrayed with tablets (or with open books), although they were usually depicted in late Renaissance and Baroque art in sumptuous robes and head-dress. In contrast, this woman has disheveled hair, with loose strands spilling on her neck and exposed upper back, and is dressed in relatively plain clothing. Against this, it has been argued that she is portrayed in an unusually spontaneous manner for the time, captured as if in the fleeting moment in which she gives her prophecy. Her skin is rendered in pearly white tones, her lips are parted as if about to speak while her finger rests on the seemingly blank tablet (tabula rasa). Art historian Simona Di Nepi, among others, has noted Velázquez's habit for employing unexceptional looking models to sit for classical subject matter and for rendering their features in a realistic, unidealised manner.

A number of art historians have raised doubts as to her identification as a sibyl and instead see the woman as a personification of painting, noting the resemblance to Velázquez's Fable of Arachne. It has been suggested that Velázquez used the same model for both works, although this claim is doubted by others on the basis that Arachne's position means her face is hidden from the viewer. Other arguments against the personification of painting include the omission of either a easel or brush. Other suggestions include Clio, the muse of history, or the painter Flaminia Triunfi, whom Velázquez is known to have met in Italy.

== Gallery ==
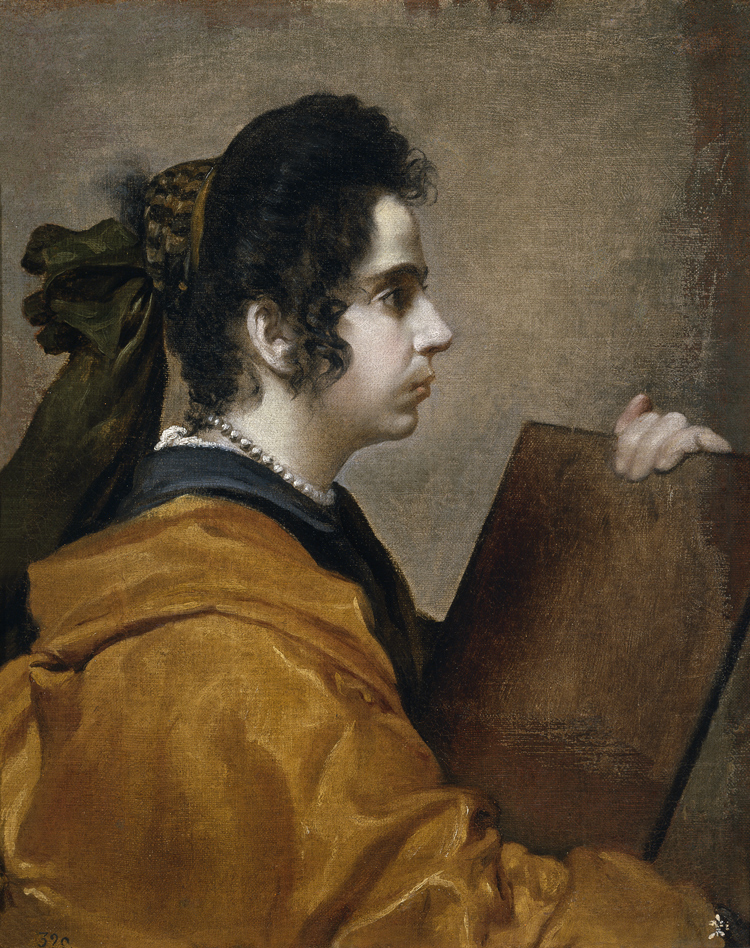
Juana Pacheco, Wife of the Artist, as a Sibyl (?), c. 1631. A more rigid representation of a similar portrait pose. This work was heavily over-painted in the 19th century, when elements such as jewellery were added. The over paint was removed in the early 1920s when it was attributed to Velázquez. Like the Sibyl with Tabula Rasa it is believed to be unfinished.

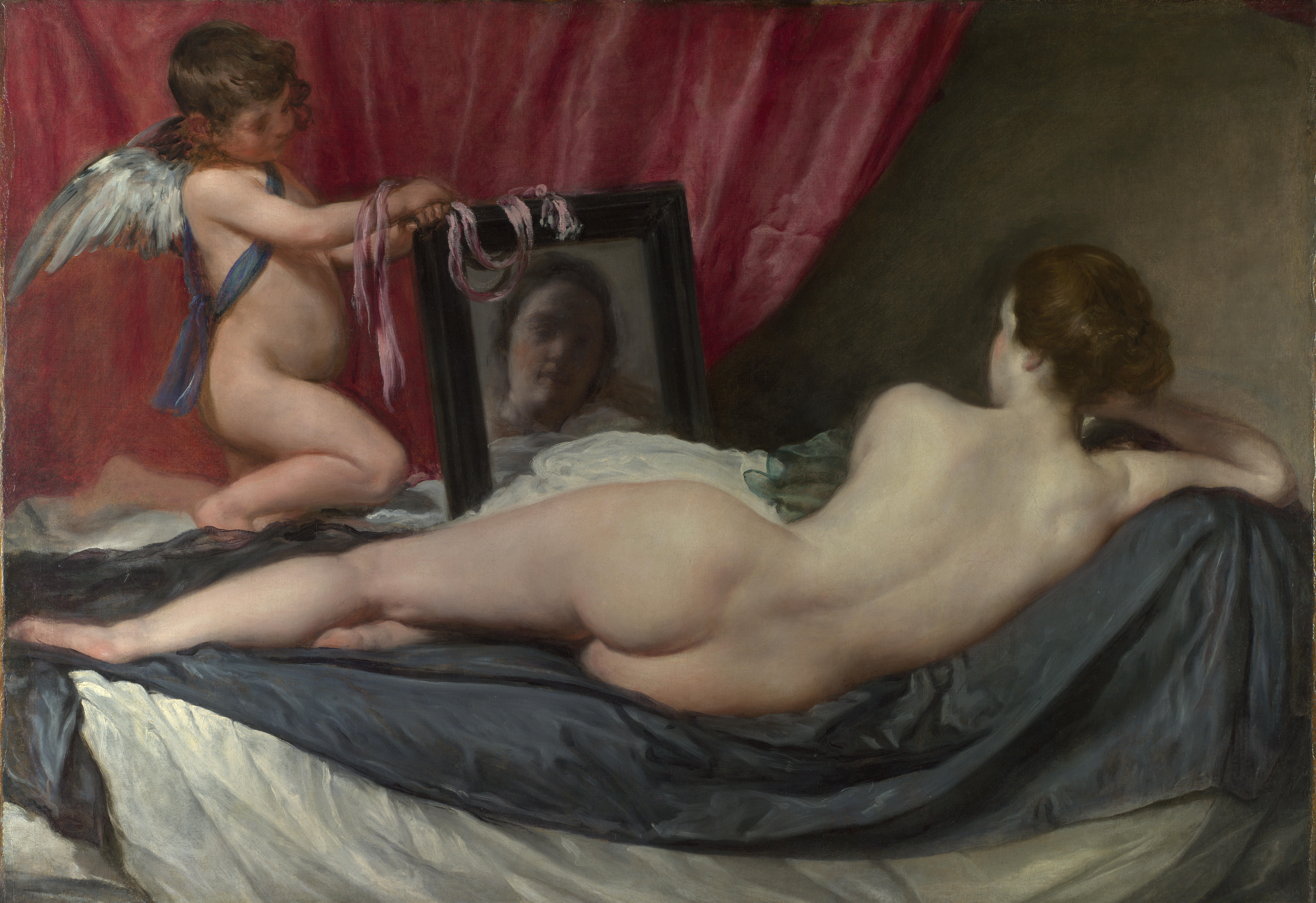
Rokeby Venus, c. 1647–51. Female Figure's approximate dating is based on the similarity of brush work.

== See also ==
- List of works by Diego Velázquez

== Sources ==
- Antonio A. Palomino. Vida de Don Diego Velázquez de Silva. Akal Ediciones, 2008. ISBN 84-460-2553-1
- Di Nepi, Simona (Ed. Dawson W. Carr). Velázquez. National Gallery London, 2006. ISBN 1-85709-303-8
